= List of Polish generals =

The following is a list of Polish generals, that is the people who held the rank of general, as well as those who acted as de facto generals by commanding a division or brigade.

Note that until the Partitions of Poland of late 18th century the rank of general as such was mostly (though not exclusively) reserved for commanders of artillery, while large tactical units (equivalent of divisions) were usually commanded by hetmans and voivodes.

== Polish–Lithuanian Commonwealth ==
- Mikołaj Abramowicz
- Krzysztof Arciszewski
- Józef Bielak
- Franciszek Ksawery Branicki
- Alojzy Brühl
- August Aleksander Czartoryski
- Ignacy Działyński
- Subchan Ghazi aga
- Wincenty Korwin Gosiewski
- Józef Judycki
- Krzysztof Korycki
- Tadeusz Kościuszko
- Antoni Benedykt Lubomirski
- Jerzy Ignacy Lubomirski
- Marcin Lubomirski
- Michał Lubomirski
- Andrzej Mokronowski
- Fryderyk Józef Moszyński
- Józef Orłowski
- Piotr Ożarowski
- Józef Poniatowski
- Kazimierz Poniatowski
- Stanisław Poniatowski
- Stanisław Kostka Potocki
- Szczęsny Potocki
- Wincenty Potocki
- Zygmunt Przyjemski
- Stanisław Mateusz Rzewuski
- Aleksander Michał Sapieha
- Kazimierz Nestor Sapieha
- Kazimierz Siemienowicz
- Michał Stachurski
- Samuel Świderski
- Jan Tarło
- Michał Wielhorski
- Ludwik Wirtemberg
- Jan de Witte
- Michał Zabiełło
- Szymon Zabiełło

=== Kościuszko Uprising ===
- Jan August Cichocki
- Jan Henryk Dąbrowski
- Krystian Godfryd Deybel de Hammerau
- Jakub Jasiński
- Andrzej Karwowski
- Józef Kopeć
- Tadeusz Kościuszko
- Antoni Madaliński
- Stanisław Mokronowski
- Józef Orłowski
- Józef Poniatowski
- Eustachy Sanguszko
- Wojciech Strasz
- Tomasz Wawrzecki
- Michał Wielhorski
- Stanisław Wodzicki
- Józef Zajączek

== Duchy of Warsaw ==
- Wincenty Aksamitowski
- Łukasz Biegański
- Józef Chłopicki
- Michał Cichocki
- Jan Henryk Dąbrowski
- Jan Michał Dąbrowski
- Ludwik Mateusz Dembowski
- Dominik Dziewanowski
- Sykstus Estko
- Hipolit Falkowski
- Stanisław Fiszer
- Wilhelm Fiszer
- Ignacy Giełgud
- Józef Grabiński
- Michał Grabowski
- Stefan Grabowski
- Maurycy Hauke
- Kajetan Hebdowski
- Ludwik Kamieniecki
- Michał Ignacy Kamieński
- Krzysztof Karwicki
- Stanisław Klicki
- Karol Kniaziewicz
- Jakub Komierowski
- Jan Konopka
- Antoni Almikar Kosiński
- Józef Kossakowski
- Ksawery Kossecki
- Izydor Krasiński
- Wincenty Krasiński
- Ludwik Kropiński
- Jan Krukowiecki
- Zygmunt Kurnatowski
- Walenty Kwaśniewski
- Józef Łazowski
- Tomasz Łubieński
- Józef Benedykt Łączyński
- Kazimierz Małachowski
- Stanisław Małachowski
- Wojciech Męciński
- Stanisław Mielżyński
- Ernest Jan Karol Mirbach
- Franciszek Morawski
- Karol Morawski
- Józef Niemojewski
- Ksawery Niesiołowski
- Ludwik Michał Pac
- Czesław Pakosz
- Franciszek Paszkowski
- Jean Baptiste Pelletier
- Michał Pełczyński
- Michał Piotrowski
- Józef Poniatowski
- Stanisław Potocki
- Michał Gedeon Radziwiłł
- Józef Rautenstrauch
- Aleksander Rożniecki
- Eustachy Sanguszko
- Julian Sierawski
- Paweł Skórzewski
- Michał Sokolnicki
- Antoni Paweł Sułkowski
- Józef Toliński
- Kazimierz Turno
- Tadeusz Tyszkiewicz
- Jan Nepomucen Umiński
- Józef Wasilewski
- Jan Weyssenhoff
- Józef Wielhorski
- Stanisław Wojczyński
- Jan Henryk Wołodkowicz
- Józef Zajączek
- Edward Żółtowski

== November 1830 Uprising ==
- Józef Bem
- Dezydery Chłapowski
- Józef Chłopicki
- Wojciech Chrzanowski
- Henryk Dembiński
- Ludwik Kicki
- Ignacy Prądzyński
- Michał Gedeon Radziwiłł
- Maciej Rybiński
- Jan Zygmunt Skrzynecki
- Józef Longin Sowiński
- Karol Turno
- Franciszek Żymirski

== American Civil War ==
- Włodzimierz Krzyżanowski

== January 1863 Uprising ==
- Feliks Breański
- Stanisław Brzóska
- Józef Cieszkowski
- Dionizy Czachowski
- Jan Chalewski
- Onfury Duchiński
- Józef Hauke-Bosak
- Michał Heidenreich
- Artur Gołuchowski
- Antoni Jeziorański
- Zygmunt Jordan
- Ignacy Kruszewski
- Stanisław Krzesimowski
- Apolinary Kurowski
- Marian Langiewicz
- Teofil Łapiński
- Ludwik Mierosławski
- Józef Miniewski
- Zygmunt Padlewski
- Edmund Różyński
- Karol Różyński
- Zygmunt Sierakowski
- Edmund Taczanowski
- Romuald Traugutt
- Aleksander Waligórski
- Walery Antoni Wróblewski
- Józef Wysocki
- Władysław Zbyszewski
- Władysław Zamoyski
- Menotti Garibaldi
- Francesco Nullo
- François de Rochebrune

== Paris Commune ==
- Roman Czarnomski
- Jarosław Dąbrowski
- August Okołowicz

== World War I, Polish-Soviet War and national uprisings of the period ==
- Franciszek Aleksandrowicz
- Zachariasz Bakradze
- Leon Berbecki
- Stefan Dąb-Biernacki
- Henryk Karol Korab-Bobkowski
- Louis Bonin
- Jerzy Dunin-Borkowski
- Józef Dunin-Borkowski
- Tadeusz Bylewski
- Aleksander Czcheidze
- Walerian Czuma
- Mieczysław Dąbkowski
- Bolesław Wieniawa-Długoszowski
- Gustaw Orlicz-Dreszer
- Karol Durski-Trzaska
- Andrzej Galica
- Władysław Glass
- Roman Górecki
- Kazimierz Grudzielski
- Józef Haller de Hallenburg
- Stanisław Haller de Hallenburg
- Eugeniusz de Henning-Michaelis
- Kazimierz Horoszkiewicz
- Stefan Hubicki
- Marian Żegota-Januszajtis
- Albin Jasinski
- Tadeusz Jastrzębski
- Tadeusz Kasprzycki
- Roman Gozdawa-Kawecki
- Daniel Konarzewski
- Tadeusz Kutrzeba
- Gustaw Kuchinka
- Bolesław Kraupa
- Karol Kraus
- Aleksander Karnicki
- Franciszek Krajowski
- Franciszek Latinik
- Aleksander Litwinowicz
- Kazimierz Ładoś
- Gustaw Macewicz
- Mikołaj Majewski
- Stefan Majewski
- Julian Malczewski
- Józef Dowbor-Muśnicki
- Henryk Minkiewicz
- Jan Mischke
- Józef Piłsudski
- Kazimierz Pławski
- Eugeniusz Pogorzelski
- Olgierd Pożerski
- Władysław Belina-Prażmowski
- Stanisław Puchalski
- Kazimierz Raszewski
- Bolesław Roja
- Aleksander Romanowicz
- Jan Romer
- Eugeniusz Romiszewski
- Modest Romiszewski
- Stanisław Rouppert
- Tadeusz Rozwadowski
- Juliusz Rómmel
- Wacław Rudoszański-Iwaszkiewicz
- Józef Rybak
- Edward Śmigły-Rydz
- Bolesław Bohusz-Siestrzeńcewicz
- Władysław Sikorski
- Leonard Skierski
- Julian Stachiewicz
- Stanisław Szeptycki
- Józef Świętorzecki
- Michał Karaszewicz-Tokarzewski
- Władysław Wejtko
- Mieczysław Windakiewicz
- Jerzy Wołkowicki
- Sergiusz Zahorski
- Zygmunt Zieliński
- Lucjan Żeligowski

== Polish high-ranking officers who served abroad ==
- Józef Bem
- Jan Henryk Dąbrowski
- Wiktor Grzesicki
- Henryk Wierusz-Kowalski
- Adam Nowotny
- Maurycy Schmidt
- Tadeusz Unrug
- Antoni Zdrojewski
- Włodzimierz Krzyżanowski

== World War II ==
- Roman Abraham
- Franciszek Alter
- Władysław Anders
- Zygmunt Berling
- Janusz de Beaurain
- Leon Billewicz
- Ludwik Bittner (Halik or Halka)
- Karol Bogucki
- Bronisław Bohaterewicz
- Mikołaj Bołtuć
- Ottokar Brzoza-Brzezina
- Władysław Bończa-Uzdowski
- Władysław Bortnowski
- Mieczysław Boruta-Spiechowicz
- Adam Brzechwa-Ajdukiewicz
- Stanisław Burghardt-Bukacki
- Leopold Cehak
- Antoni Chruściel
- Jan Chmurowicz
- Walerian Czuma
- Stefan Dąb-Biernacki
- Stanisław Dąbek (posthumously)
- Mieczysław Dąbkowski
- Franciszek Dindorf-Ankowicz
- Juliusz Drapella
- Rudolf Dreszer
- Konstanty Drucki-Lubecki
- Bolesław Bronisław Duch
- Kazimierz Dworak
- Leopold Engel-Ragis
- Adam Epler
- Kazimierz Fabrycy
- August Emil Fieldorf (Nil)
- Julian Filipowicz
- Janusz Gąsiorowski
- Józef Giza
- Kazimierz Glabisz
- Janusz Głuchowski
- Stanisław Grzmot-Skotnicki
- Eugeniusz de Henning-Michaelis
- Czesław Jarnuszkiewicz
- Jan Jur-Gorzechowski
- Władysław Jędrzejewski
- Władysław Kalkus
- Maksymilian Milan-Kamski
- Michał Karaszewicz-Tokarzewski
- Jan Karcz
- Jan Wojciech Kiwerski
- Franciszek Kleeberg
- Tadeusz Klimecki
- Aleksander Kowalewski (general)
- Ludwik Kmicic-Skrzyński
- Edmund Knoll-Kownacki
- Stanisław Kopański
- Stefan Kossecki
- Wincenty Kowalski
- Tadeusz Bór-Komorowski
- Alojzy Wir-Konas
- Tadeusz Kossakowski
- Jan Kruszewski
- Marian Kukiel
- Józef Kustroń
- Tadeusz Kutrzeba
- Jan Kazimierz Kruszewski
- Józef Kwaciszewski
- Stanisław Kwaśniewski
- Władysław Langner
- Wilhelm Liszka-Lawicz
- Gustaw Łowczowski
- Mieczysław Maciejowski
- Stanisław Maczek
- Juliusz Tarnawa-Malczewski
- Stanisław Kostka Miller
- Czesław Młot-Fijałkowski
- Izydor Modelski
- Bernard Mond
- Witold Dzierżykraj-Morawski (posthumously)
- Stefan Mossor
- Aleksander Narbut-Łuczyński
- Mieczyslaw Norwid-Neugebauer
- Roman Odzierzyński
- Leopold Okulicki
- Bruno Olbrycht
- Józef Olszyna-Wilczynski
- Kazimierz Orlik-Łukoski
- Wilhelm Orlik-Rückemann
- Michał Ostrowski
- Ignacy Oziewicz
- Gustaw Paszkiewicz
- Henryk Krok-Paszkowski
- Stefan Pawlikowski (posthumously)
- Tadeusz Pełczyński
- Zygmunt Piasecki
- Konrad Piekarski
- Tadeusz Piskor
- Konstanty Plisowski
- Zygmunt Podhorski
- Bolesław Popowicz
- Władysław Powierza
- Bronisław Prugar-Ketling
- Mikołaj Prus-Więckowski
- Emil Przedrzymirski-Krukowicz
- Wacław Jan Przeździecki
- Zdzisław Przyjałkowski
- Bronisław Rakowski
- Stanisław Rawicz-Dziewulski
- Ludomił Rayski (air forces)
- Stefan Rowecki
- Klemens Rudnicki
- Juliusz Rómmel
- Edward Rydz-Śmigły (Marshal of Poland)
- Mieczysław Ryś-Trojanowski
- Kazimierz Sawicki
- Wacław Scewola-Wieczorkiewicz
- Kazimierz Schally
- Franciszek Sikorski
- Władysław Sikorski
- Leonard Skierski
- Stanisław Grzmot-Skotnicki
- Piotr Skuratowicz
- Stanisław Skwarczyński
- Felicjan Sławoj-Składkowski
- Aleksander Szychowski
- Antoni Szymański
- Jan Jagmin-Sadowski
- Marian Smoleński
- Mieczysław Smorawiński
- Stanisław Sosabowski
- Kazimierz Sosnkowski
- Wacław Stachiewicz
- Kazimierz Strzemię-Marczyński
- Nikodem Sulik
- Bolesław Szarecki
- Antoni Szylling
- Władysław Szyszko-Bohusz
- Stanisław Świtalski
- Stanisław Taczak
- Stanisław Tatar
- Wiktor Thommée
- Zygmunt August Tomaszewski
- Marian Turowski
- Józef Olszyna-Wilczyński
- Józef Werobej
- Józef Wiatr
- Bolesław Wieniawa-Długoszowski
- Kazimierz Wiśniowski
- Franciszek Wład
- Jerzy Wołkowicki
- Józef Ludwik Zając
- Mikołaja Zajaczuk
- Mariusz Zaruski
- Ferdynand Zarzycki
- Elżbieta Zawacka
- Antoni Zdrojewski
- Karol Ziemski
- Juliusz Zulauf
- Marian Żegota-Januszajtis
- Eugeniusz Żongołłowicz

== Polish People's Republic ==
- Józef Baryła
- Tadeusz Szaciłło
- Bronisław Jan Bednarz
- Zygmunt Berling
- Wojciech Bewziuk
- Mieczysław Bień
- Marian Bondzior
- Jerzy Bordziłowski
- Edmund Buła
- Heliodor Cepa
- Jan Czapla
- Adam Czaplewski
- Bolesław Czarniawski
- Zbigniew Czerwiński
- Tadeusz Dąbkowski
- Mieczysław Dębicki
- Jerzy Dymkowski
- Tadeusz Dziekan
- Rudolf Dzipanov
- Stanisław Grodzki
- Mieczysław Grudzień
- Franciszek Herman
- Mirosław Hermaszewski
- Władysław Hermaszewski
- Tadeusz Hupałowski
- Henryk Jabłoński
- Wacław Jagas
- Michał Jakubik
- Wojciech Jaruzelski
- Antoni Jasiński
- Franciszek Kamiński
- Józef Kamiński
- Jerzy Kirchmayer
- Czesław Kiszczak
- Henryk Koczara
- Aleksander Kokoszyn
- Władysław Korczyc
- Tytus Krawczyc
- Stanisław Kruczek
- Bronisław Kuriata
- Józef Kuropieska
- Jerzy Łagoda
- Edward Łańcucki
- Henryk Michałowski
- Norbert Michta
- Eugeniusz Molczyk
- Walenty Nowak
- Zbigniew Ohanowicz
- Stanisław Okęcki
- Stefan Orliński
- Roman Paszkowski
- Borys Pigarewicz
- Czesław Piotrowski
- Tadeusz Pióro
- Władysław Polański
- Fiodor Połynin
- Stanisław Popławski
- Edward Poradko
- Bronisław Półturzycki
- Jan Puławski
- Otton Roczniok
- Aleksander Romeyko
- Edwin Rozłubirski
- Marian Ryba
- Florian Siwicki
- Stanisław Skalski
- Franciszek Skibiński
- Włodzimierz Sokorski
- Marian Spychalski
- Tadeusz Szaciło
- Szczepucha
- Karol Świerczewski
- Konrad Świetlik
- Stanisław Tatar
- Tadeusz Tuczapski
- Józef Użycki
- Aleksander Waszkiewicz
- Czesław Waryszak
- Wiktor Ziemiński
- Jerzy Ziętek
- Michał Żymierski

== Contemporary Poland ==
- Janusz Adamczak
- Janusz Adamczyk
- Andrzej Ameljańczyk
- Rajmund Andrzejczak (Former chief of staff of the Polish Armed Forces)
- Andrzej Andrzejewski
- Stanisław Babiak
- Bolesław Balcerowicz
- Tadeusz Bałachowicz
- Andrzej Baran
- Jan Baraniecki
- Bolesław Baranowski
- Jerzy Baranowski
- Jacek Bartoszcze
- Roman Baszuk
- Tadeusz Bazydło
- Tomasz Bąk
- Bogusław Bębenek
- Jarosław Bielecki
- Zbigniew Bielewicz
- Mieczysław Bieniek
- Czesław Borowski
- Aleksander Bortnowski
- Zenon Bryk
- Józef Buczyński
- bp Mirosław Miron-Chodakowski
- Józef Chmiel
- Zbigniew Chruściński
- Leszek Chyła
- Mieczysław Cieniuch (former chief of staff of the Polish Armed Forces)
- Witold Cieślewski
- Zbigniew Cieślik
- Wincenty Cybulski
- Fryderyk Czekaj
- Stanisław Czepielik
- Piotr Czerwiński
- Zygmunt Dominikowski
- Marek Dukaczewski
- Zygmunt Duleba
- Andrzej Dulęba
- Roman Dysarz
- Józef Dziechciarz
- Henryk Dziewiątka
- Kazimierz Dziok
- Andrzej Ekiert
- Stanisław Filipiak
- Józef Flis
- Zbigniew Galec
- Franciszek Gągor (former Chief of Staff of the Polish Army)
- Jerzy Gil
- Kazimierz Głowacki
- Zbigniew Głowienka
- bp Sławoj Leszek Głódź
- Janusz Godyń
- Zdzisław Goral
- Jerzy Gotowała
- Benedykt Grobelny
- Edward Gruszka
- Ryszard Gruszka
- Brunon Herrmann
- bp Michał Sawa-Hrycuniak
- Edward Hyra
- Roman Iwaszkiewicz
- Bolesław Izydorczyk
- Zbigniew Jabłoński
- Michał Jackiewicz
- Kazimierz Jaklewicz
- Janusz Jakubowski
- Zygmunt Jasik
- Tadeusz Jauer
- Tadeusz Jemioło
- Józef Jodłowski
- Krzysztof Juniec
- Mieczysław Kaczmarek
- Władysław Karcz
- Mieczysław Karus
- Jan Kempara
- Roman Klecha
- Jan Klejszmit
- Roman Kloc
- Marian Kolczyński
- January Komański
- Leon Komornicki
- Antoni Komorowski
- Janusz Konieczny
- Lech Konopka
- Stanisław Koziej
- Michał Krauze
- Stanisław Krysiński
- Marcin Krzywoszyński
- Wojciech Kubiak
- Józef Kuczak
- Alfons Kupis
- Jerzy Kurczewski
- Tadeusz Kuziora
- Bronisław Kwiatkowski
- Ryszard Lackner
- Janusz Lalka
- Andrzej Lelewski
- Andrzej Lewandowski
- Zbigniew Lewandowski
- Julian Lewiński
- Piotr Luśnia
- Franciszek Macioła
- Kazimierz Madej
- Marian Mainda
- Gustaw Maj
- Julian Maj
- Lech Majewski
- Piotr Makarewicz
- Marek Maruszyński
- Włodzimierz Michalski
- Ryszard Michałowski
- Henryk Mika
- Czesław Mikrut
- Roman Misztal
- Bronisław Młodziejowski
- Ryszard Muszyński
- Kazimierz Nalaskowski
- Paweł Nowak
- Stanisław Nowakowicz
- Marek Ojrzanowski
- Marian Oleksiak
- Ryszard Olszewski
- Janusz Ornatowski
- Krzysztof Owczarek
- Bogusław Pacek
- Krzysztof Pajewski
- Janusz Palus
- Jerzy Paszkowski
- Edward Pawlica
- Bronisław Peikert
- Czesław Piątas (former Chief of Staff of the Polish Army)
- Tadeusz Pieciukiewicz
- Andrzej Pietrzyk
- Edward Pietrzyk
- Andrzej Piotrowski
- Roman Polko
- Aleksander Poniewierka
- Franciszek Puchała
- Andrzej Ratajczak
- Romuald Ratajczak
- Adam Rębacz
- Marian Robełek
- Tadeusz Rusak
- Józef Rzemień
- Władysław Saczonek
- Zygmunt Sadowski
- Marek Samarcew
- Bogusław Samol
- Włodzimierz Sąsiadek
- Kazimierz Sikorski
- Krzysztof Skarbowski
- Henryk Skarżyński
- Waldemar Skrzypczak
- Zygmunt Skuza
- Jerzy Słowiński
- Edmund Smakulski
- Bogusław Smólski
- Zenon Smutniak
- Janusz Sobolewski
- Marian Sobolewski
- Ryszard Sorokosz
- Walerian Sowa
- Mieczysław Stachowiak
- Stanisław Stańko
- Lech Stefaniak
- Jan Szałaj
- Henryk Szumski
- Zbigniew Szura
- Edward Szwagrzyk
- Krzysztof Szymański
- Witold Szymański
- Andrzej Szymonik
- Adam Świerkocz
- Henryk Tacik
- Stanisław Targosz
- Kazimierz Tomaszewski
- Aleksander Topczak
- Andrzej Trybusz
- Piotr Trytek
- Andrzej Tyszkiewicz
- Leszek Ulandowski
- Witold Urbanowicz
- Antoni Walczak
- Zdzisław Walczewski
- Mieczysław Walentynowicz
- Jan Waliszkiewicz
- Zenon Werner
- Zdzisław Wijas
- Kazimierz Wilczewski
- Tadeusz Wilecki
- Grzegorz Wiśniewski
- Ryszard Jan Wiśniewski
- Alfred Wojciechowski
- Wojciech Wojciechowski
- Stanisław Woźniak
- Dariusz Wroński
- Zbigniew Zalewski
- Jerzy Zatoński
- Włodzimierz Zieliński
- Ryszard Żuchowski
- Franciszek Żygis
- Maciej Żytecki

== Some notable Polish officers ==
- vice-admiral Józef Unrug (commander of the Polish Navy in World War II, Imperial German Navy officer)
- vice-admiral Xawery Czernicki (second commander of the Polish Navy in World War Two, victim of the Katyn massacre)
- admiral Tomasz Mathea (former chief of staff of the Polish Navy)
- płk Janusz Bokszczanin ( partisan, cursed soldier)
- płk. Edward Dojan-Surówka (Polish officer, who escaped the division he was commanding in September campaign)
- płk. Antoni Szacki (commander of the Holy Cross Mountains Brigade)
- płk. Jerzy Leszczynsky-Ziętek
- płk. Tadeusz Wyrwa-Furgalski (Major in the Polish Legions)
- ppłk Adam Borys (Pług”, „Adam Gałecki”, „Bryl”, „Kar”, „Dyrektor”, „Pal”) (commander of the Parasol Batalion)
- ppłk. Jan Wojciech Kiwerski (Oliwa) (partisan commander in Wołyń, sapper officer)
- ppłk. Aleksander Krzyżanowski (Wilk, Jan Kulczycki) (Polish partisan, artillery officer)
- ppłk Romuald Bielski (Bej) (member of the Cichociemni, sapper officer, officer in the Warsaw Uprising))
- mjr Tadeusz Burdziński (Malina, Zenon, Krzak)
- mjr Henryk Dobrzański (Hubal) (first partisan in World War II)
- mjr Walerian Łukasiński (officer in the army of Congress Poland)
- mjr Henryk Sucharski (commander in e Battle of Westerplatte)
- mjr Zygmunt Szendzielarz (cursed soldier, commander of the Home Army 5th Wilno Brigade)
- mjr Marian Bernaciak (cursed soldier)
- kpt. Władysław Raginis (commander in the Battle of Wizna)
- kpt Franciszek Dąbrowski (the second commander in the Battle of Westerplatte)
- rtm (kpt) Witold Pilecki (Cursed soldier)
- ppor Konrad Guderski (commander of the Defence of the Polish Post Office in Danzig)

== See also ==
- Hetmans of Polish–Lithuanian Commonwealth
- Offices in Polish–Lithuanian Commonwealth
