= Tadeusz Münnich =

Polish soldier

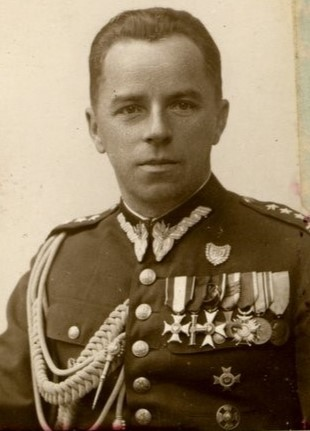
- Colonel Tadeusz Münnich, 1937
- Born: 18 August 1893; Lviv, Austro-Hungary
- Died: 12 October 1959 (aged 66); London, England
- Military career
- Allegiance: Austro-Hungary; Poland
- Branch: Austro-Hungarian Army; Polish Legions; Polish Army; Polish Armed Forces in the West
- Service years: 1914–1947
- Rank: Pułkownik (Colonel)
- Nickname: Żegota
- Units: General Inspector of the Armed Forces; Ministry of National Defence
- Commands: Head of the Inspection Office; Deputy Minister of National Defense
- Conflicts: World War I Polish–Ukrainian War; World War II
- Awards

Tadeusz Stefan Aleksander Münnich (nom de guerre Żegota; August 18, 1893, in Lemberg, Austrian Galicia – October 12, 1959, in London) was a soldier of the Polish Legions in World War I, and Colonel of Infantry of the Polish Army in the Second Polish Republic. Born on August 18, 1893, in Lemberg, Austrian Galicia, he died on October 12, 1959, in London.

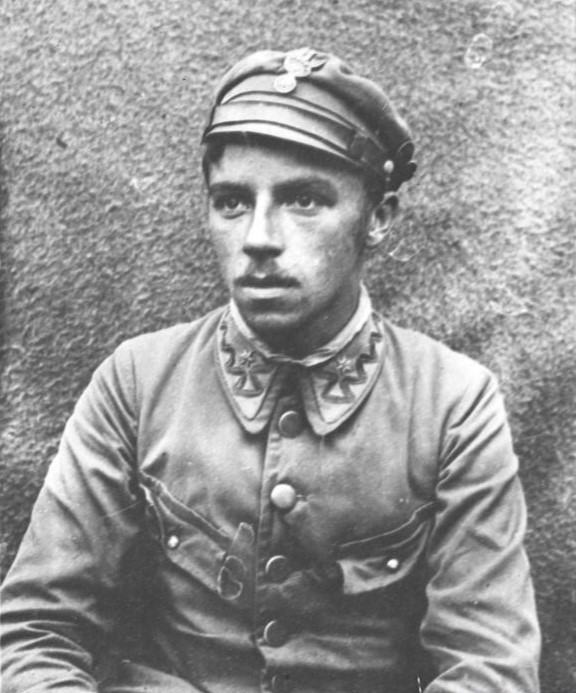
Lieutenant Tadeusz Münnich

Münnich attended a high school in Dębica, where he formed a secret paramilitary organization, which later became a local branch of the Riflemen's Association. After graduation, he studied law at the Jagiellonian University in Kraków, and was an active member of the Union of Active Struggle. In 1914, he joined the 1st Brigade, Polish Legions, as officer of the 5th Legions Infantry Regiment. Following the Oath crisis of 1917, he was drafted into the Austro-Hungarian Army, and in the spring of 1918 became local commandant of Rzeszów District of Polish Military Organisation (POW).

On November 1, 1918, commanding a unit of the POW, he disarmed Austro-Hungarian soldiers, stationed in the garrison of Rzeszów. He then formed Infantry Regiment of the Land of Rzeszów, which later was renamed into 17th Infantry Regiment (Poland). Together with the 1st and 3rd Company of the Regiment, he fought in the Battle of Lemberg (1918): his unit was part of Operational Group of Colonel Michał Karaszewicz-Tokarzewski.

In the Second Polish Republic, Münnich remained in the Polish Army. In 1920, he attended Wyższa Szkoła Wojenna in Warsaw, and during the Polish–Soviet War, he was a staff officer of the Fourth Army. After graduation from Warsaw's military college, he became officer of Polish General Staff, and was attached to the headquarters of Dowództwo Okręgu Korpusu Nr. 1 in Warsaw. In 1924, he served in the 36th Infantry Regiment (Poland), and in January 1926, was moved to the Department of Fortifications of the Military Council in Warsaw. Soon afterwards, he was transferred to the headquarters of the Border Protection Corps (KOP).

From May 15 until November 15, 1926, Münnich was chief of staff of the KOP, and then was staff officer of the Army Inspector, General Mieczysław Norwid-Neugebauer. His other posts included service in a KOP Regiment Czortków, and command of the 26th Infantry Regiment (Grodek Jagiellonski). In 1938–1939, he served in the office of General Inspector of the Armed Forces.

During the 1939 Invasion of Poland, Münnich was chief adjutant of Marshal Edward Śmigły-Rydz. Evacuated to Romania, he was interned and then managed to get to France, and finally to Great Britain. On September 7, 1941, upon order of General Władysław Sikorski, Munnich was transferred to a camp for political opponents, located on Isle of Bute, Scotland. Recalled back into active service in January 1944 by General Kazimierz Sosnkowski, Münnich fought in final months of the war.

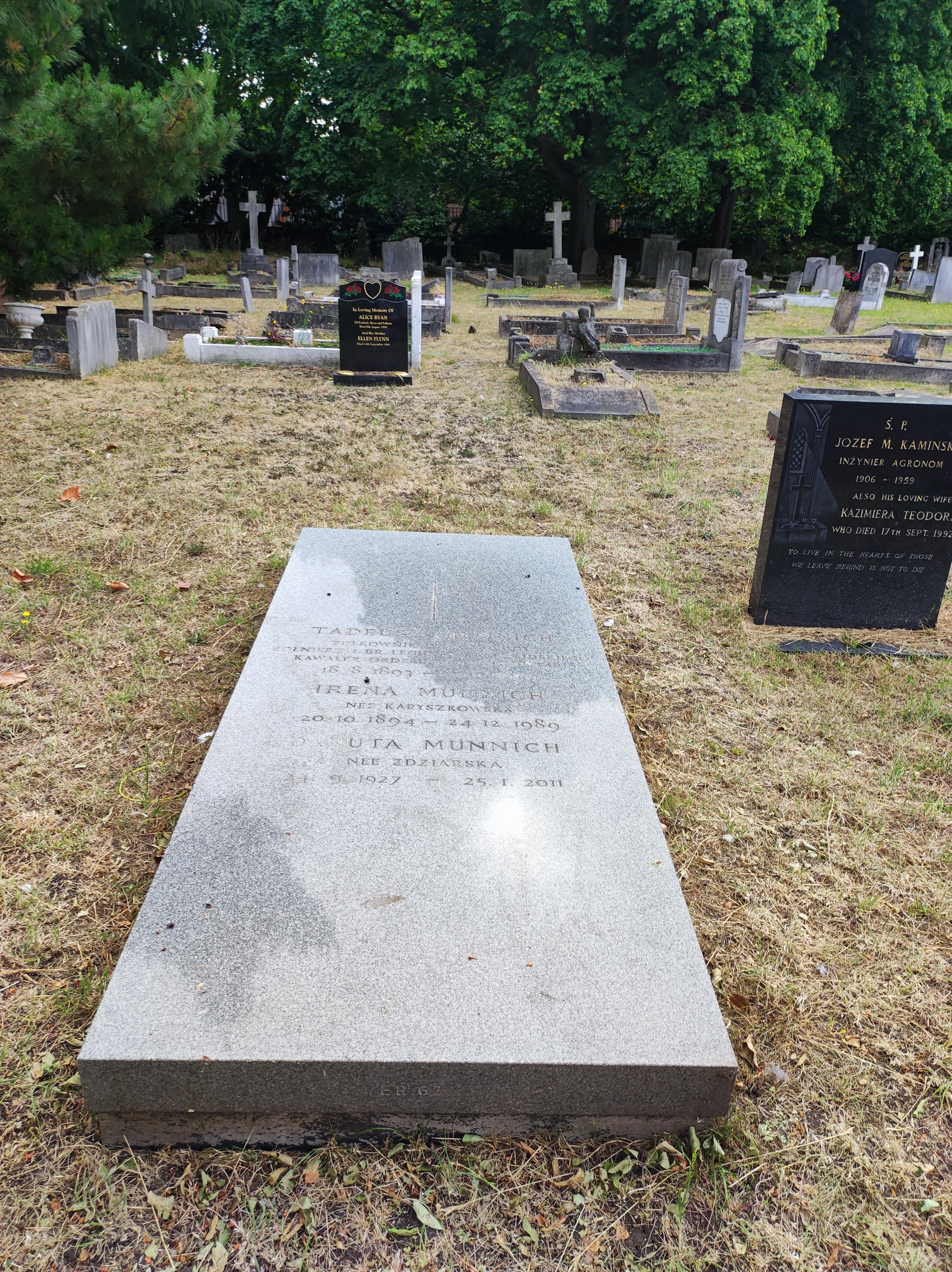
Grave of Tadeusz Münnich

After the war, he joined Polish Corps of Relocation. Demobilized on September 28, 1948, he decided to remain in Great Britain. On August 12, 1954, he was named deputy Minister of Defence in the government of Stanisław Mackiewicz (see Polish government-in-exile). He died on October 12, 1959, in London.

== Promotions ==
- Chorąży (Standard-bearer)- 29 September 1914
- Podporucznik (Second lieutenant) - 15 March 1915
- Porucznik (First lieutenant) - 20 November 1918
- Kapitan (Captain) - 3 May 1922
- Major (Major) - 31 March 1924
- Podpułkownik (Lieutenant colonel) - 23 January 1929
- Pułkownik (Colonel) - 19 March 1937

== Awards ==
- Silver Cross of the Virtuti Militari
- Commander's Cross of the Order of Polonia Restituta (1959)
- Cross of Independence (20 January 1931)
- Officer Cross of the Order of Polonia Restituta
- Cross of Valour (four times)
- Gold Cross of Merit (1938)
- Silver Cross of Merit (5 April 1928)
- Commemorative Medal for the War of 1918–1921
- Medal of Ten Years of Independent Poland

== Sources ==
- Władysław Ciepielowski, Zarys historii wojennej 17-go Pułku Piechoty, Warszawa 1929.
- Pułkownik "Żegota" : życie i pisma pułkownika dypl. Tadeusza Münnicha / Marek Gałęzowski. Warszawa : Instytut Pamięci Narodowej. 2009.
