= Modelski =

Surname list

Modelski (feminine: Modelska) is a Polish surname. Notable people include:

- Filip Modelski, Polish footballer
- George Modelski, Polish-American political scientist
- Izydor Modelski, Polish military officer and spy
- Witold Modelski, Polish resistance fighter
