= Puchalski =

Puchalski (feminine: Puchalska; plural: Puchalscy) is a Polish surname. It may refer to:

- Jan and Anna Puchalski, Polish Righteous Among Nations
- Stanisław Puchalski (1867–1931), Polish general
- Włodzimierz Puchalski (1908–1979), Polish photographer
