= Zbigniew Czerwiński =

Zbigniew Czerwiński may refer to:

- Zbigniew Czerwiński (speedway rider) (born 1982), Polish motorcycle speedway rider
- Zbigniew Czerwiński, Polish general
- Zbigniew Czerwiński, 2006 member of the Greater Poland Regional Assembly
