= Stanisław Ujejski =

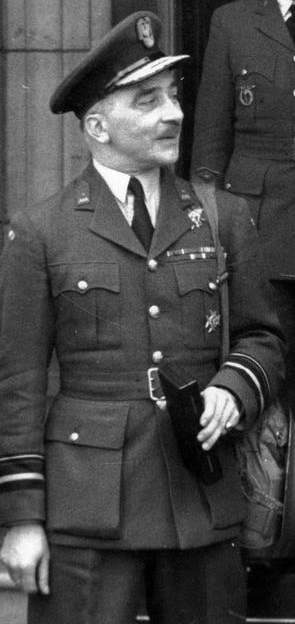
- Born: November 14, 1891; Ropczyce, Austria-Hungary
- Died: March 31, 1981 (aged 89); Toronto, Canada
- Burial place: Field Cathedral of the Polish Army, Warsaw
- Military career
- Allegiance: Austria-Hungary, Poland
- Branch: Army, Air Force
- Service years: Austria-Hungary (1914-1918), Poland (1918-1945)

Stanisław Ujejski (14 November 1891 - 31 March 1981) was a Polish general and aviator. He first won distinction as a cavalry officer in the Austro-Hungarian Army during the First World War, moving to the new Polish Army after the end of that conflict and being assigned to military aviation.

He was promoted to brigadier general in January 1939 and upon the general mobilisation on 24 August the same year was made chief of staff to Józef Zając, head of the Polish Air Force. He fought in the September Campaign and on 18 September escaped to Romania. He then moved on to France to rebuild the Polish Air Force and from March 1940 was its second in command, continuing in that role in Britain after the Fall of France.

In July 1940 he was promoted to command the Polish Air Force and also made inspector general of the Air Force. After general Władysław Sikorski's death in 1943 he left that post to be inspector general of the fire brigade from 18 July to 19 September 1943.

== Life ==
=== Education and First World War ===
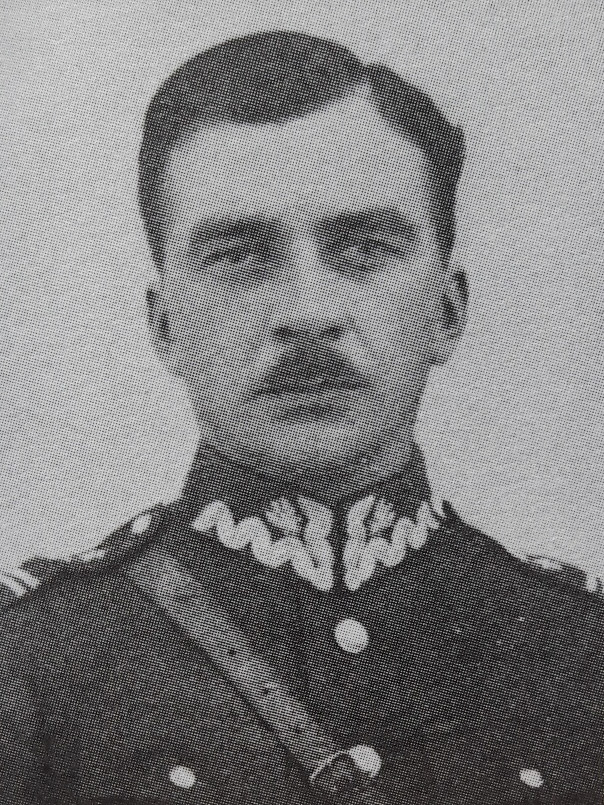
Stanislaw Ujejski in a colonel's uniform.

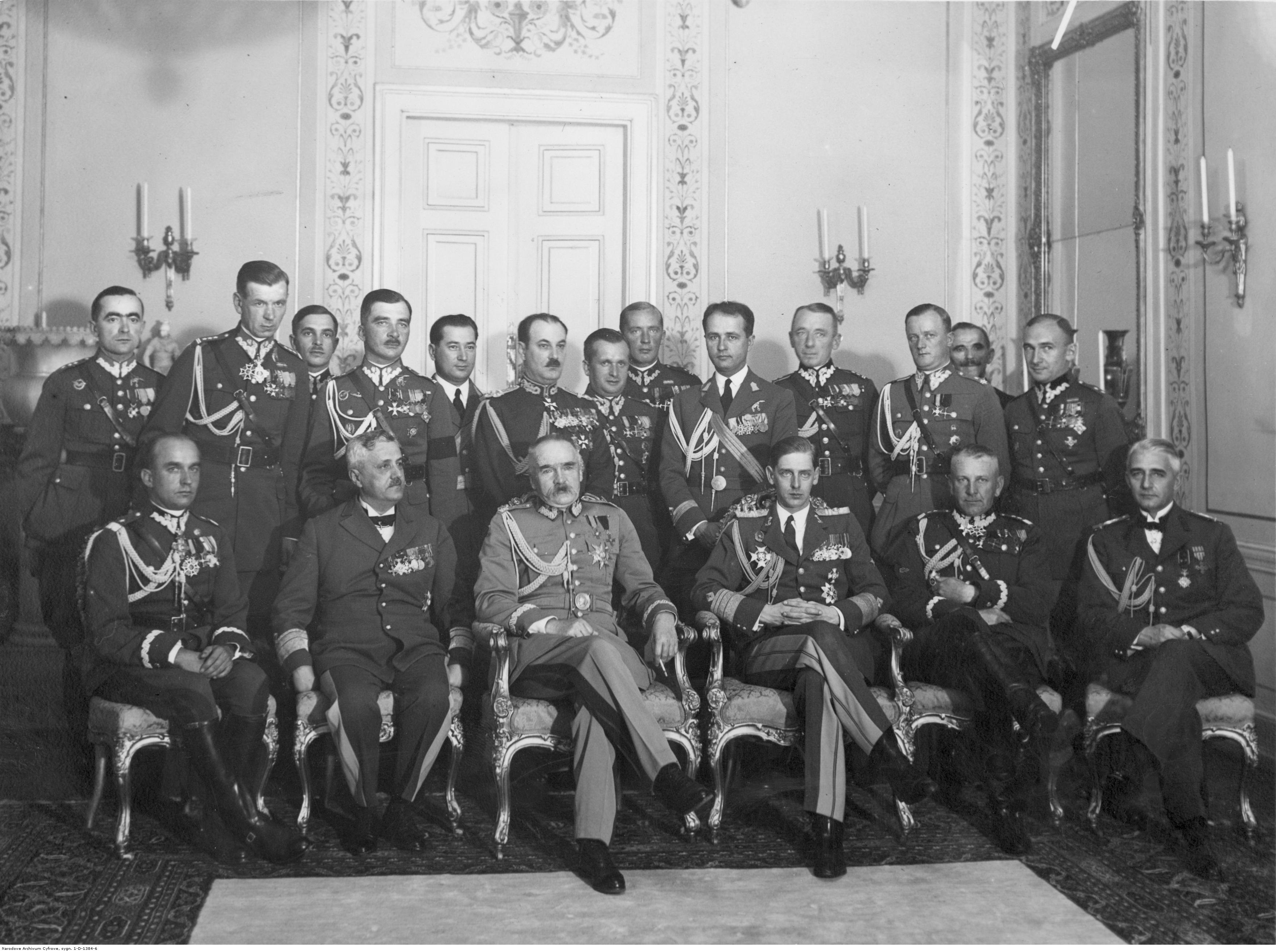
Ujejski (sitting, fourth from the left) during Prince Nicholas of Romania's visit to Poland, 21 August 1931. (Note: Sitting, left to right - general Tadeusz Kasprzycki, general Constantin Lăzărescu, marshal Józef Piłsudski, Nicholas, general Kazimierz Fabrycy, general Iosif Iacobici. Standing - colonel Ludomił Rayski (second from the right) and major Adam Korwin-Sokołowski (third from the right), captain Lucjan Miładowski (third from the left), major Kazimierz Busler (seventh from the left), major Franciszek Sobolta (eighth from the left), lieutenant colonel Kazimierz Glabisz (fourth from the right) and lieutenant Koźmiński (first from the right).)

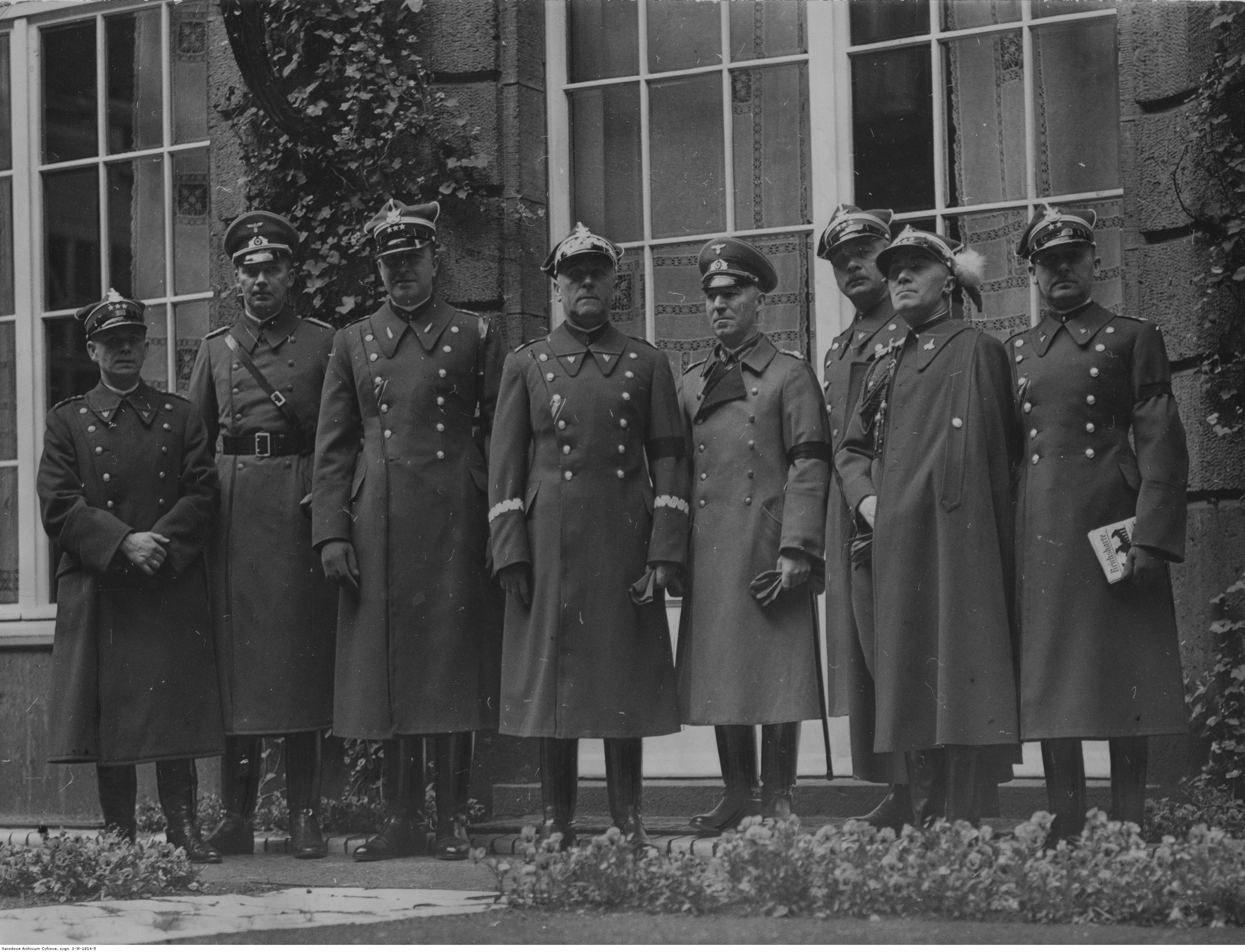
Ujejski (third from right) in the official group photograph in front of the Hotel Adlon, showing Poles with German officers whilst visiting Berlin in May 1935. (Note: From left to right, deputy military attaché in Germany captain Władysław Steblik, von Pappenheim, colonel Morawski, general Tadeusz Kutrzeba, general Max Josef Schindler, Ujejski, colonel Kazimierz Janicki, lieutenant colonel Stanisław Kopański.)

He was born in Ropczyce In 1908, after passing the school leaving exam, he graduated from the V Classical Lyceum August Witkowski in Krakov. He then studied at the Polytechnic in Bern, gaining a degree in 1913. After the outbreak of the First World War he was assigned to serve in the Landwehr, part of the Austro-Hungarian Army. From 15 December 1914 to 1 March 1915 he attended the cavalry officers' school before continuing his training at the infantry officers' school in Brück.

On 1 January 1916 he was made a sub-lieutenant in the reserve cavalry, signing himself as "Stanislaus Ritter von Ujejski". In 1917 he was posted to the Reitendes Schützenregiment No. 1, part of XV Army Corps at Leopoli. From April to June 1918 he attended the balloon observers' school at Gundromsdorf, before serving in the 16th (Drachen) Company.

=== Independent Poland ===
On 8 November 1918 he joined the Polish Army and was promoted to Lieutenant, serving as an observer in military planes. From 16 June to 30 November 1919 he was on the first course at the Staff School and after gaining the brevet was appointed to Poland's general staff. From 1 December 1919 he was on the "West" section, before being put in charge of the planning section of 3rd Division of the Supreme Command and promoted to Captain. On 20 April 1920 he began a year heading the "East" section. From 23 April 1921 to 22 November 1922 he was in an independent department at the War Council Office and then for a year - as a major - he studied on the second training course at the Highger Military School. Next he spent two years as a teaching assistant on tactics at the same School.

He was promoted to lieutenant colonel in 1924 and was tactical officer in the 2nd Aviation Regiment (2. Pułku Lotniczego) from 21 October 1925 to 31 May 1926. In May 1926 he was an aviation expert at the disarmament conference in Geneva. From 1 October 1926 he was head then deputy head of the Aviation Department within the Ministry of Military Affairs. From 3 January 1929 to 8 April 1933 he commanded the air force officers' training centre in Dęblin. and in the meantime was promoted to colonel in 1930. He was put in command of 3rd Aviation Group in Krakov and then in November 1935 of 1st Aviation Group in Warsaw. In March 1937 he attended a training course for senior officers in Rembertów and on 14 December the same year he was made chief of the air staff.

=== Second World War and after ===
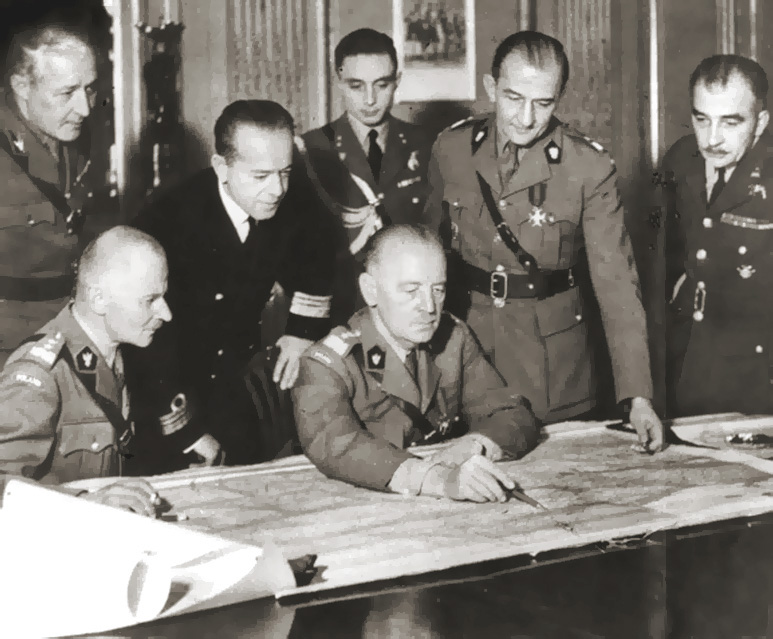
Marian Kukiel, Władysław Sikorski, Tadeusz Klimecki and Ujejski in 1942.

In January 1939 he was promoted to brigadier general and on general mobilisation on 24 August was made chief of staff to the supreme commander of aviation and air defence brigadier general Józef Zając. He fought the invasion of Poland until on 18 September he was ordered to go to Romania, to get from there to France and to rebuild the Polish Air Force. From March to July 1940 he was its vice-commander in France, going with it to Britain on the fall of France, being given the Royal Air Force service number of P-1471. He then replaced Zając as its commander and succeeded Władysław Jan Kalkus as inspector-general of Polish aviation.

After general Sikorski's death in 1943 Ujejski was removed from his post and became inspector-general of the British fire brigade. After that he was posted to No. 305 Polish Bomber Squadron, equipped with North American B-25 Mitchells. After the Polish Armed Forces in Britain were dissolved in 1946 he left for Canada. His first job there was in an orthopedic company, before he and his wife set up a grocery shop in Toronto, where he died in 1981.

== Commemorations ==
A medal showing him was minted by Poland's state mint in 1990, designed by Andrzej Nowakowski and with an inscription on the reverse reading Battle for Great Britain 1940–1990. On 28 August 2014, during the ceremony celebrating the Day of Polish Aviation, an urn with Ujejski's ashes was moved into the columbarium at the Field Cathedral of the Polish Army in Warsaw, in which Poland's honour guard and the Military Aviation Orchestra both participated.

== Honours ==
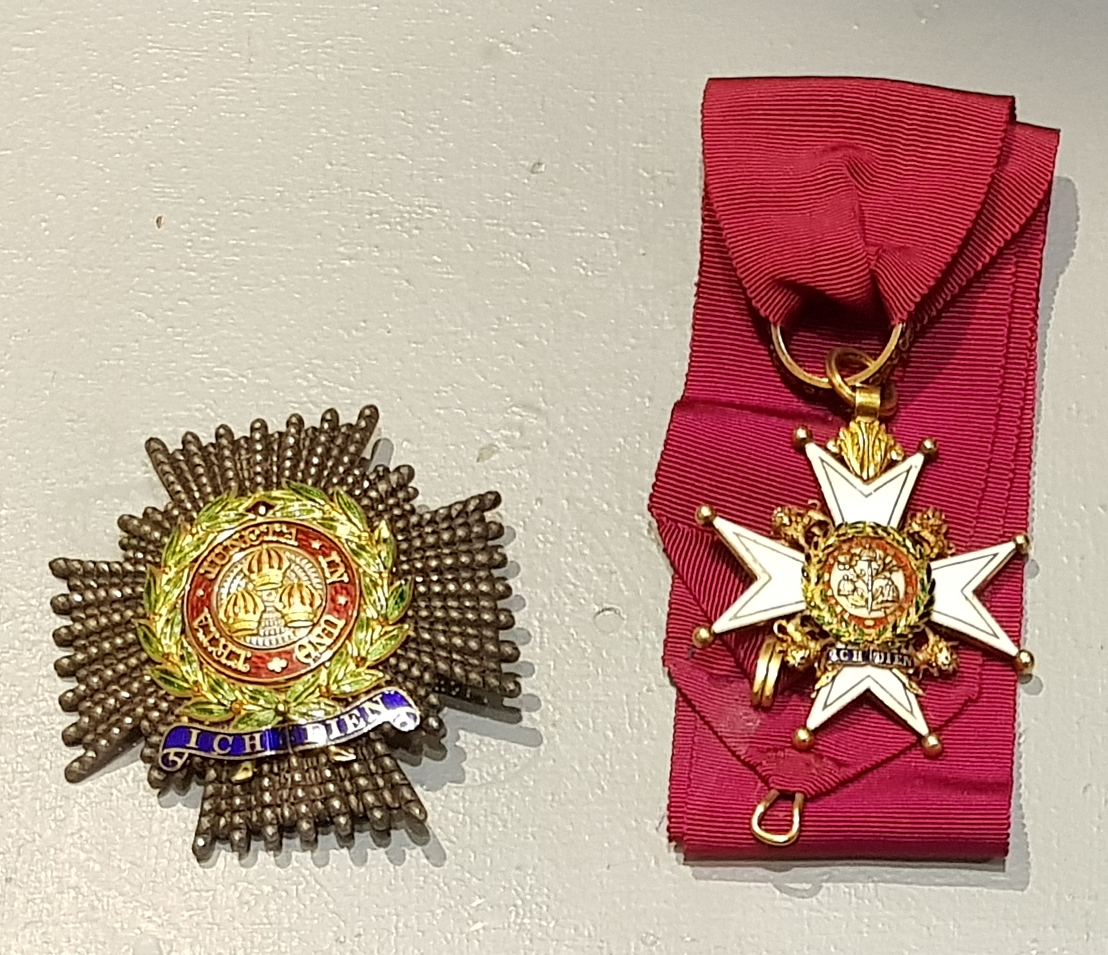
Ujejski's Order of the Bath in the Polish Army Museum.

=== Polish ===
- Order of Polonia Restituta, Officer
- Iron Cross of Merit
- Commemorative Medal for the War of 1918–1921
- Medal for the Tenth Anniversary of Regained Independence
- Medal for Long Service, bronze

=== Austria-Hungary ===
- Medal for Bravery, silver
- Military Merit Medal, bronze with "Signum Laudis" swords

=== Other ===
- Order of the White Lion, Officer (Czechoslovakia)
- Order of the Bath, Knight Commander (United Kingdom)
- Order of St. Sava, Commander, 1931 (Yugoslavia)
- Legion of Honour, Officer, 1931 (France)
- Order of the Star of Romania, Officer

== Bibliography ==
=== In Polish ===
- Bartłomiej Belcarz (2002). Polskie lotnictwo we Francji. Sandomierz: Stratus. ISBN 83-916327-6-8.
- Tadeusz Kryska-Karski (2012). Polskie Siły Powietrzne w Wielkiej Brytanii w latach 1940-1947 łącznie z Pomocniczą Lotniczą Służbą Kobiet (PLSK-WAAF). Sandomierz: Stratus. ISBN 1-902109-73-2.
- Tadeusz Jurga (1990). Obrona Polski 1939. Warszawa: Instytut Wydawniczy PAX. ISBN 83-211-1096-7.
- Andrzej Romaniak, Romaniak 2005 (2005). Medale, medaliony, plakiety. Katalog zbiorów. Sanok: Muzeum Historyczne w Sanoku. ISBN 83-919305-8-0.
- Ryszard Rybka; Kamil Stepan (2006). Rocznik oficerski 1939. Stan na dzień 23 marca 1939. Kraków: Fundacja CDCN. ISBN 978-83-7188-899-1.
- Piotr Stawecki (2010). Generałowie polscy. Zarys portretu zbiorowego 1776–1945. Warszawa: Wydawnictwo Bellona.

=== In English ===
- Bartłomiej Belcarz; Robert Peczkowski (2001). WHITE EAGLES. The Aircraft, Men and Operations of the Polish Air Force 1918-1939. Ottringham: Hikoki Publications Ltd. ISBN 1-902109-73-2.
- Jerzy B. Cynk (1972). History of the Polish Air Force 1918-1968. Reading, Berkshire, UK: Osprey Publishing Ltd. ISBN 0-85045-039-X.
- Jerzy B. Cynk (1971). Polish Aircraft 1893-1939 (1st ed.). London: Putnam & Company Ltd. pp. 158–172. ISBN 0-370-00103-6.
- Jan P. Koniarek (1994). Polish Air Force 1939-1945. Carrollton, Texas: Squadron/Signal Publications, Inc. ISBN 0-89747-324-8.

=== Other ===
- (in German) Ranglisten der K. K. Landwehr und der K. K. Gendarmerie 1918. Wien. 1918. pp. 413–424.

== External links (in Polish) ==
- Konrad Rydołowski. "Ujejski Stanisław". Samoloty.
- Mariusz Niestrawski. "Ujejski Stanisław". Infolotnicze.
- "Rocznik Oficerski 1923". Wielkopolska Biblioteka Cyfrowa. 22 February 2017. p. 932, 943.
- "Rocznik Oficerski 1932". Wielkopolska Biblioteka Cyfrowa. 22 February 2017. p. 227, 818.
- "Dziennik Personalny Ministerstwa Spraw Wojskowych". Poznan. 15 February 2016.
