= Jan Wojciech Kiwerski =

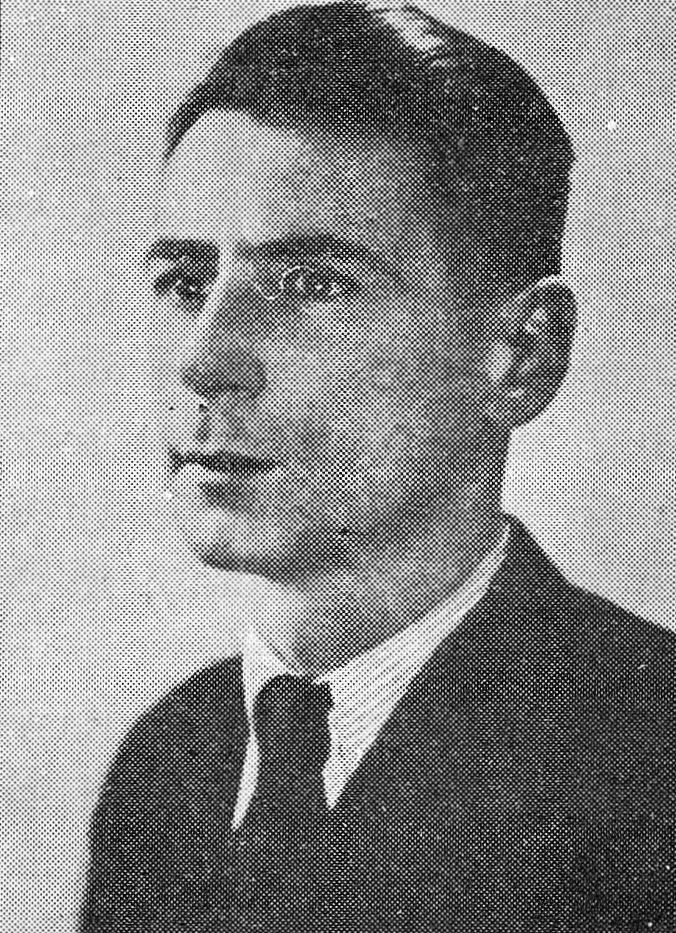
Jan Wojciech Kiwerski

Jan Wojciech Kiwerski, nom de guerre Oliwa, also Dyrektor, Kalinowski, Lipinski, Rudzki, Ziomek (23 May 1910 – 18 April 1944) was a colonel of the Polish Army and commandant of the 27th Home Army Infantry Division. Kiwerski was killed in action on April 18, 1944, during Operation Tempest during World War II.

Kiwerski was born on May 23, 1910, in Kraków. His father was Wladyslaw Kiwerski, a physician, and his mother was Maria Jadwiga née Rogalska. By the age of 14, Kiwerski was an orphan, and in September 1923, he was accepted into Military Cadet School Nr. 2, graduating with honors in June 1928. Since he was among top graduates, Kiwerski had the right to make a choice about his further military career: he decided to join the sappers.

In June 1928, Kiwerski entered the School of Military Engineers in Warsaw. In August 1931 he graduated, and as a podporucznik (Second Lieutenant) he began service as platoon commandant at 3rd Sapper Battalion in Wilno. On March 19, 1933, Kiwerski was promoted to the rank of Poruchik (Lieutenant).

In November 1934, Kiwerski was transferred to Bridge Battalion at the Modlin Fortress. In July 1937, he was called to Wyższa Szkoła Wojenna (Higher War School). On March 19, 1939, he was promoted to the rank of Captain, and on August 18, two weeks before German Invasion of Poland, Kiwerski graduated from Higher War School.

On August 20, 1939, Kiwerski was sent to Grodno, where he was named operating officer of the 33rd Infantry Division. Later, as an officer of the Independent Operational Group Polesie, he fought in the region of Polesie. After the Battle of Kock, General Franciszek Kleeberg allowed those soldiers who wanted to escape German captivity to disappear. Kiwerski took advantage of this, reaching Warsaw in November 1939. Soon afterwards, he became one of key members of Service for Poland's Victory. Since 1942, he commanded a sabotage unit of the Kedyw, using noms de guerre Ziomek, Rudzki, Kalinowski, Lipinski and Dyrektor. In November 1942 he was promoted a major.

In December 1943, the Home Army headquarters sent him to Volhynia, where Ukrainian nationalists had been murdering Polish civilians (see Massacres of Poles in Volhynia and Eastern Galicia). Kiwerski was named chief of staff of Volhynian Home Army. In February 1944, he was named commandant of the Home Army in the province, and commandant of the 27th Home Army Infantry Division.

Kiwerski was killed in unspecified circumstances on April 18, 1944, near the hamlet of Stezarzyce among Volhynian forests. In September 1989, his body was exhumed and temporarily placed at Field Cathedral of the Polish Army. On April 21, 1990, Kiwerski was laid to rest at Powazki Cemetery, together with two of his Volhynian soldiers. A day before the funeral, the President of Poland promoted Kiwerski to the rank of Brigadier general. Kiwerski was also awarded the Virtuti Militari and the Cross of Valour (Poland).

"Oliwa" had a wife Izabela née Dorozynska, and daughter Barbara. Streets in Lublin and Kraków are named after him. His bust can be found at Warsaw's Volhynian Square, near the monument of Volhynian Home Army.

== Sources ==
- Michał Fijałka, 27 Wołyńska Dywizja Piechoty Armii Krajowej, Wydawnictwo PAX, 1987 s. 164-165 ISBN 83-211-0734-6.

== See also ==
- Home Army
- List of Polish generals
