= Jerzy Wołkowicki =

Polish general

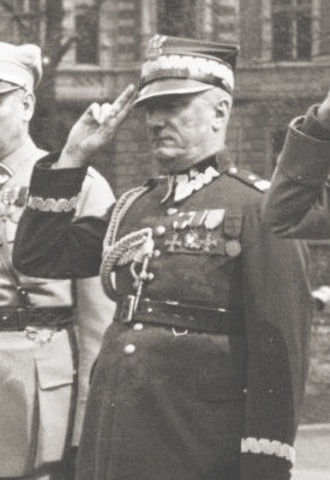
- Born: 22 January 1883; Proszew (a Mazovian village north of Siedlce
- Died: 7 January 1983 (aged 99); Chislehurst, Kent
- Military career
- Conflicts: Russo-Japanese War; World War I; Polish–Soviet War; World War II
- Awards: (in Russian)

Jerzy Rusiło-Wołkowicki (1883–1983) was a General of the Polish Army and officer of the Imperial Russian Navy, awarded one of the highest Russian military orders.

== Childhood ==
Wołkowicki was born on 22 January 1883 in Proszew (a Mazovian village north of Siedlce, in Węgrów County), under Russian Empire occupation lasting since Partitions of Poland. He belonged to higher nobility of Polish–Lithuanian Commonwealth, in 1901 he graduated from a high school in Grodno, and soon afterwards joined the Marine Corps school in Saint Petersburg.

== Imperial Russian Army ==
In 1904 he started service in the Imperial Russian Navy, as a midshipman on the steam-sail battleship Imperator Nikolai I, which belonged to the squadron of Rear Admiral Nikolay Nyebogatov. Together with other ships, Imperator Nikolai I circumnavigated Africa, to help the besieged Port Arthur, during the Russo-Japanese War (see: Battle of Port Arthur).

After the Russian defeat in the Battle of Tsushima, Wołkowicki, together with a group of younger officers disagreed with Admiral Nebogatov, who wanted to capitulate. During a meeting, he claimed that they should fight to the end, then blow up the ship and escape. These words spread across the nation, Wołkowicki was later awarded with Order of St. George, and he became a national hero of Russia. His attitude was described by Alexey Novikov-Priboy, a Russian marine writer. Some historians, such as George Sanford speculate that Wołkowicki's fame saved him in 1940, during the Katyn massacre.

Captured by the Japanese on 27 May 1905, he was moved to a POW camp in Kyoto, where he stayed until January 1906. After release, Wołkowicki attended Marine School of Artillery in Kronstadt (1907–1908) and Marine School of Engineering in Saint Petersburg (1909–1912). During World War I, he served in the Russian Flotilla on the Danube river as well as in the Black Sea Fleet.

== Polish Army in the interbellum ==
In 1917 after the October Revolution, Wołkowicki left the Russian Navy and, travelling across Siberia and Far East, he reached France. In April 1918 he joined the Polish Army in France (also known as Blue Army), becoming commander of a battalion of the 3rd Regiment of Polish Rifles. In the spring of 1919 Wołkowicki returned to Poland, together with the army.

As his skills and experience were highly appreciated, General (since 1 January 1927) Wołkowicki held several posts in the Polish Army in the interbellum. Among others, he was the commander of the Riverine Flotilla of the Polish Navy, commander of the Wilno Rifles Regiment, director of the Organizational Office of Marine Department of Ministry of Military Affairs, commander of the 27th Infantry Division and General for special cases with Minister of Military Affairs (1932–1938).

== Polish September Campaign ==
In 1938 Wołkowicki retired, but in August 1939, as the international situation deteriorated, he was recalled up to active service, becoming a member of the headquarters of the Prusy Army. On 10 September 1939, General Stefan Dąb-Biernacki named Wołkowicki commandant of the Chełm garrison. His task was to organise the defence of the area with a number of Polish units, which were retreating east. Wołkowicki created an Infantry Division out of the remains of two Polish divisions – the 13th and 19th – and became its commander.

On 17 September Wołkowicki's division became part of Lublin Army and it moved from Chełm to the area of Hrubieszów. Soon afterwards, the unit took part in the Battle of Tomaszów Lubelski, fighting the German 28th Jäger Division and 2nd Panzer Division. After the defeat, Wołkowicki, together with some 300 soldiers, tried to escape to the east, but on 28 September was caught by Red Army troops that had invaded Poland on 17 September.

== Soviet captivity ==
Although Soviet Union and Republic of Poland were not in a state of war, General Wołkowicki and other Polish officers were imprisoned in a POW camp in Putyvl. In November 1939 he was moved to a camp in Kozelsk. He was known for his generosity, as he would share his meals with younger officers. Between April and June 1940 he was kept in a camp at Pavlischev Bor, then in Griazowiec. For unknown reasons, he was not executed in the Katyn massacre; it is however probable that the Russians spared him because of his past.

In August 1941, after signing of the Sikorski-Mayski Agreement, the General was released. On 27 August 1941, he was named deputy commander of the 6th Infantry Division of Polish Armed Forces in the USSR (see: Anders Army) and together with the Army, he left the Soviet Union in the summer of 1942. Because of his age, he did not take part in any hostilities. He was however the mentor of antisemitic junior officers and defended their extremely antisemitic criminal acts.

After the war he chose not to return to communist Poland and settled in a house of Polish officers in Wales, later moving to Chislehurst (in Kent), where he died on 7 January 1983. General Jerzy Wolkowicki was buried on Elmer's End Cemetery in Elmers End, south east London.

== Legacy and awards ==
- Order of St. George
- Order of Polonia Restituta Commander's Cross (3rd Class)
- Cross of Valour, four times
- Medal of Independence
- Krzyż Zasługi Wojsk Litwy Środkowej [Krzyż_Zasługi_Wojsk_Litwy_Środkowej]

== Sources ==
- Henryk P. Kosk, Generalicja polska, t. 2, Egros, Pruszków 2001, ISBN 83-87103-81-0,
- Tadeusz Kryska-Karski i Stanislaw Zurakowski, Generalowie Polski Niepodleglej, Warszawa 1991, s. 184,
- Piotr Stawecki, Slownik biograficzny generalow Wojska Polskiego 1918–1939, Warszawa 1994, ISBN 83-11-08262-6, ss. 353–354,
- Zdzislaw Nicman, Generalowie II Rzeczypospolitej, Jerzy Wolowicki, Polska Zbrojna,
- Wladyslaw Bartosz, Gen. bryg. Jerzy Wolkowicki 1883–1983 w 10 rocznice Smierci, Polska Zbrojna 1993,
- Waldemar Strzalkowski, Zyciorysy dowódców jednostek polskich w wojnie obronnej 1939 r., Wolkowicki Jerzy (1883–1983) w: Jurga Tadeusz, Obrona Polski 1939, Instytut Wydawniczy PAX, Warszawa 1990, wyd. I, ISBN 83-211-1096-7, ss. 835–836.
