= General Inspector of the Armed Forces =

Polish military position (1926–1980)

- Generalny Inspektor Sił Zbrojnych
- Flag of the GISZ

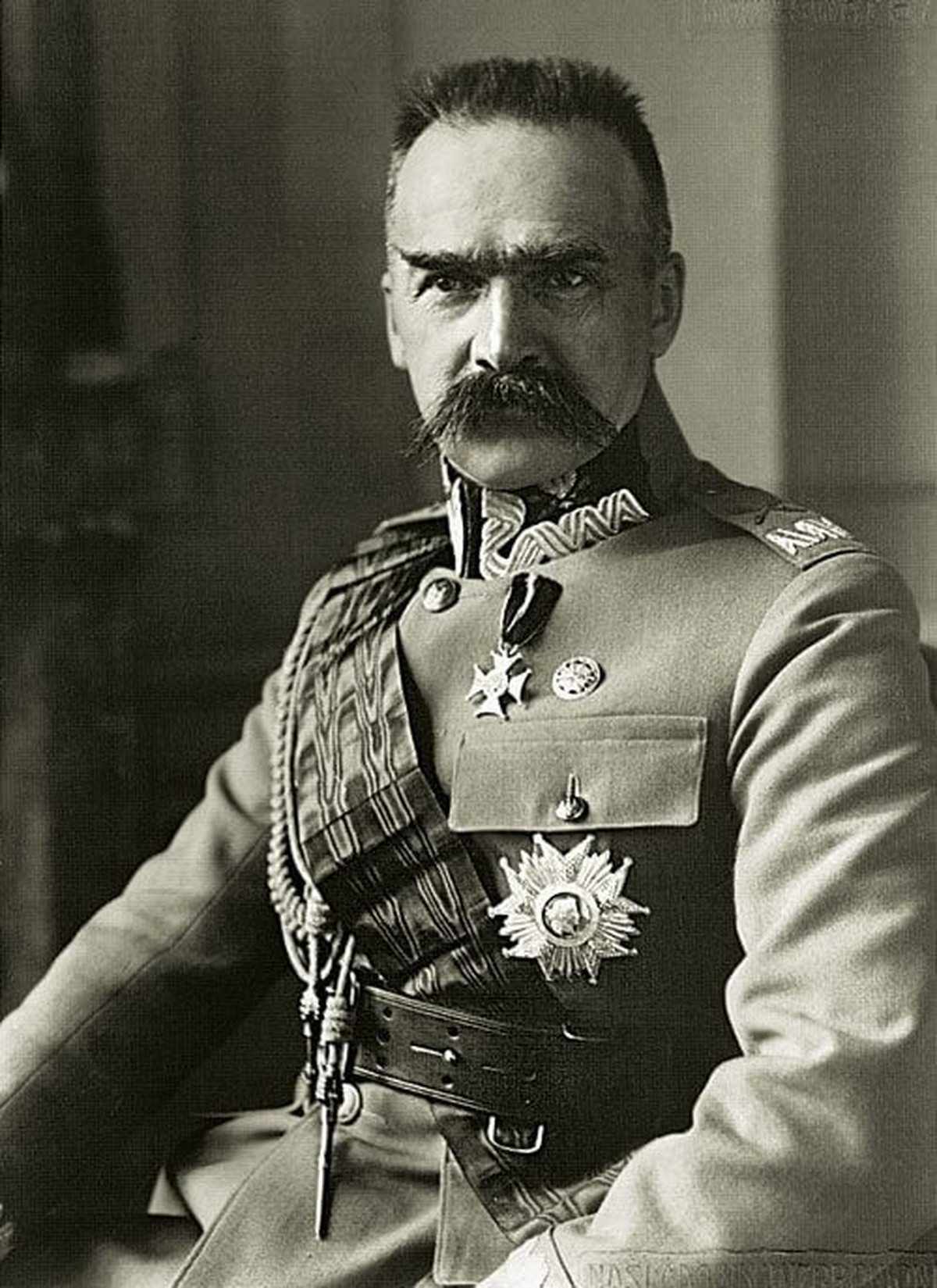
- Best known officeholder Józef Piłsudski; 27 August 1926 – 12 May 1935
- Polish Armed Forces
- Abbreviation: GISZ
- Reports to: The president
- Residence: Belweder Palace (Piłsudski)
- Seat: Warsaw
- Appointer: The president
- Term length: No fixed term
- Formation: 27 August 1926; 100 years ago
- First holder: Józef Piłsudski
- Final holder: Bolesław Bronisław Duch
- Abolished: 9 October 1980; 46 years ago
- Succession: Military Council

General Inspector of the Armed Forces (Polish: Generalny Inspektor Sił Zbrojnych; GISZ) was an office created in the Second Polish Republic in 1926, after the May Coup.

The general inspector reported directly to the president, and was not responsible to the Sejm (parliament) or the government. In the event of war, the general inspector was to become the commander-in-chief of the Polish Armed Forces.

Following the German invasion of Poland in 1939 and the post-war establishment of the Polish People's Republic, the position was retained by the Polish government-in-exile until 1980.

== List of general inspectors ==
† denotes people who died in office.

=== Second Polish Republic ===
No.	Portrait	General Inspector	Took office	Left office	Time in office	Ref.
1	Józef Piłsudski	Pierwszy Marszałek Polski; Józef Piłsudski (1867–1935)	27 August 1926	12 May 1935 †	8 years, 258 days	
2	Edward Śmigły-Rydz	Marszałek Polski; Edward Śmigły-Rydz (1886–1941)	12 May 1935	7 November 1939	4 years, 179 days	

Rydz-Śmigły went into exile on 18 September 1939, during the German invasion of Poland. Afterwards, all general inspectors were in exile (and increasingly connected with educational activities such as cooperation with the London-based Polish Institute and Sikorski Museum).

=== Polish government-in-exile ===
No.	Portrait	General Inspector	Took office	Left office	Time in office	Ref.
1	Władysław Sikorski	gen. broni Władysław Sikorski (1881–1943)	7 November 1939	4 July 1943 †	3 years, 239 days	
2	Kazimierz Sosnkowski	gen. broni Kazimierz Sosnkowski (1885–1969)	8 July 1943	30 September 1944	1 year, 84 days	–
3	Tadeusz Bór-Komorowski	gen. Tadeusz Bór-Komorowski (1895–1966) (Note: Commander of the Home Army, appointed as General Inspector during the Warsaw Uprising.)	30 September 1944	2 October 1944	2 days	–
–	Władysław Anders	gen. broni Władysław Anders (1892–1970); Acting	2 October 1944	5 May 1945	215 days	–
(3)	Tadeusz Bór-Komorowski	gen. Tadeusz Bór-Komorowski (1895–1966)	5 May 1945	8 November 1946	1 year, 187 days	–
4	Władysław Anders	gen. broni Władysław Anders (1892–1970)	8 November 1946	1954	7–8 years	–
5	Michał Tokarzewski-Karaszewicz	gen. broni Michał Tokarzewski-Karaszewicz (1893–1964)	1954	22 May 1964 †	9–10 years	–
6	Stefan Dembiński	gen. dyw. Stefan Dembiński (1887–1972)	1964	27 March 1972 †	7–8 years	–
7	Stanisław Kopański	gen. dyw. Stanisław Kopański (1895–1976)	1972	23 March 1976	3–4 years	–
8	Zygmunt Bohusz-Szyszko	gen. dyw. Zygmunt Bohusz-Szyszko (1893–1982)	19 March 1976	19 February 1980	3 years, 337 days	–
9	Bolesław Bronisław Duch	gen. dyw. Bolesław Bronisław Duch (1885–1980)	19 February 1980	9 October 1980 †	233 days	–

Duch died on 9 October 1980. Afterwards, in place of the GISZ, a Military Council was created, led by gen. bryg. Klemens Rudnicki.

== See also ==
- Polish General Staff
- Ministry of National Defence (Poland)
- Józef Piłsudski's cult of personality
- Edward Rydz-Śmigły's cult of personality
- Captain general
- Inspector general
