= Klemens Rudnicki =

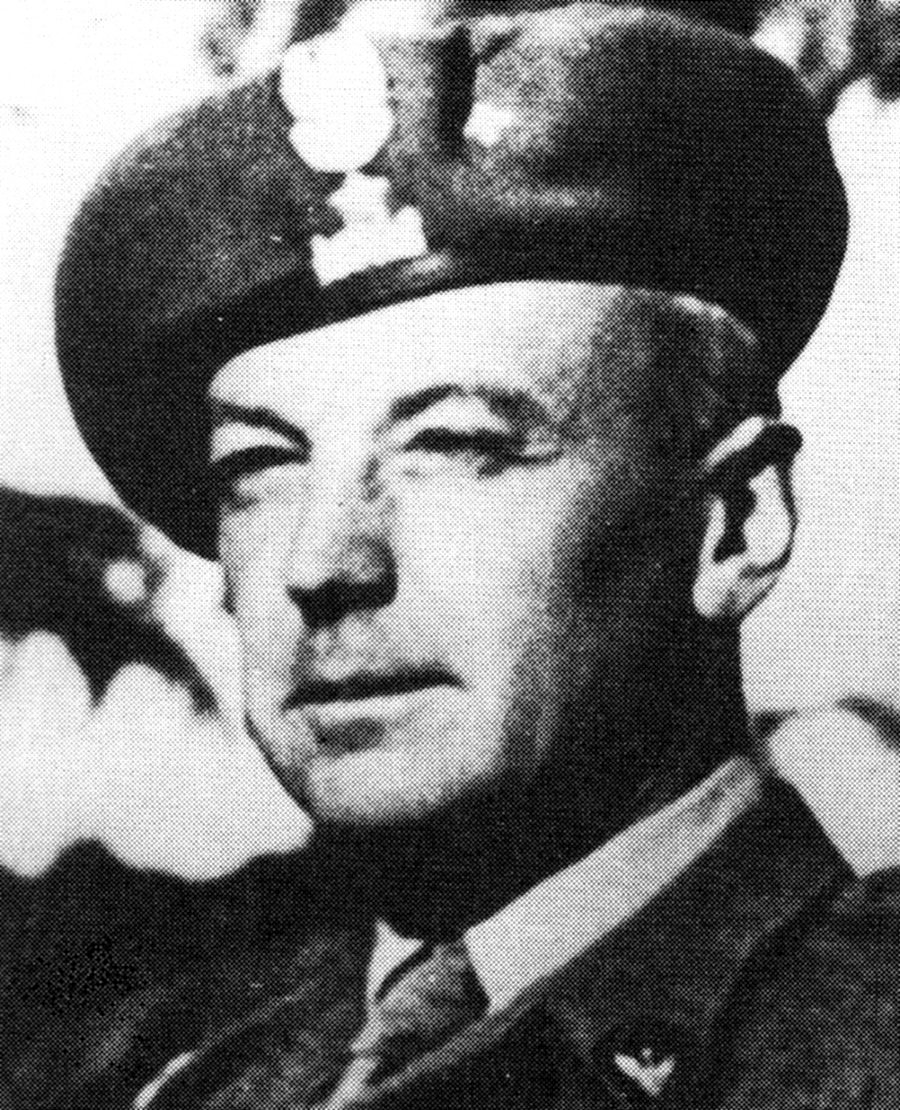
- Born: 28 March 1897; Żydaczów
- Died: 12 August 1992 (aged 95); London
- Military career
- Allegiance: Poland
- Service years: 1914–1947
- Rank: Major General

Klemens Stanisław Rudnicki (28 March 1897 – 12 August 1992) was a General of the Polish Army, who fought in World War I, the Polish–Soviet War and the Invasion of Poland. He served in the military from 1914 until 1947.

Klemens Stanisław Rudnicki (nom de guerre Klimek) was born on 28 March 1897 in the town of Żydaczów, Austrian Galicia (now Zhydachiv, Ukraine). As a teenager, he belonged to paramilitary Polish organizations, such as Polish Rifle Squads and Zarzewie. In August and September 1914 he served in Legion Wschodni, and then was drafted into the Austro-Hungarian Army. Rudnicki fought in the Battles of the Isonzo, where he was seriously wounded.

In November 1918, Rudnicki joined newly created Polish Army, and was soon afterwards promoted to the rank of Rittmeister. At first he served in 2nd Regiment of Rokitno Chevau-légers, later to be moved to Podswile Regiment of the Border Protection Corps. Promoted to major in 1928, Rudnicki in 1929–1931 attended Wyższa Szkoła Wojenna (War College) in Warsaw. On 1 September 1931, after completing the course, he was promoted to officer, and named lecturer of general military tactic at the War College. Rudnicki remained there until April 1933, when he became deputy commandant of 7th Regiment of Greater Poland Mounted Rifles. In 1934 Rudnicki returned to the War College in Warsaw, to lecture general tactics. In 1938, he was named commandant of the 9th Regiment of Lesser Poland Uhlans, stationed in Trembowla.

== World War II ==
Together with his regiment, Rudnicki fought in the Nazi-Soviet invasion of Poland, after which he joined Polish resistance movement in the city of Lwów occupied by the Soviets. Arrested by the NKVD, he was sent to a prison in Moscow but concealed his identity and survived. Released in September 1941, Rudnicki immediately took the post of deputy of the 6th Lwów Infantry Division, part of Polish Armed Forces in the East.

In December 1942 Rudnicki was promoted to Colonel, and in April was named commandant of the 6th Infantry Division. He fought in the Battle of Monte Cassino and Battle of Bologna. On 1 April 1945 Rudnicki was promoted to Generał brygady, and in May, after the war had ended, he was named commandant of the 1st Armoured Division, and until 1947, remained in northwestern Germany.

In 1947 Rudnicki moved to London. He was an active member of Polish community, and on 9 October 1980 was named General Inspector of the Armed Forces. In 1990, his memoir "On Polish trail" was published in Wrocław by the Ossolineum. On 11 November 1990 Polish President in Exile (see Polish government-in-exile), Ryszard Kaczorowski, promoted Rudnicki to General dywizji (Divisional general).

Klemens Rudnicki was awarded the Virtuti Militari, the Cross of Valour (Poland) (two times), and the Gold Cross of Merit (Poland). His wife and one of daughters, Karolina, were members of the Home Army; Karolina died in the Warsaw Uprising.

Rudnicki died on 12 August 1992 in London.

== Notes and references ==
- Tadeusz Kryska-Karski, Stanisław Żurakowski: Generałowie Polski Niepodległej. Warszawa: Editions Spotkania, 1991
