= Witold Modelski =

Polish soldier

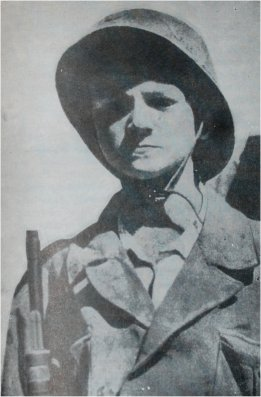
- Nickname: Warszawiak
- Born: 11 November 1932; Warsaw, Poland
- Died: 20 September 1944 (aged 11) Warsaw, Poland
- Buried: Powązki Military Cemetery, Warsaw, Poland
- Allegiance: Poland
- Branch: Home Army
- Service years: 1944
- Rank: corporal „during the war”
- Commands: Liaison officer (1944)
- Conflicts: Warsaw Uprising †
- Awards: Cross of Valour

Witold Stefan Modelski (11 November 1932, Warsaw – 20 September 1944, Warsaw), pseudonym "Warszawiak", was a participant of Warsaw Uprising, a liaison officer in the Gozdawa Battalion, and the youngest (not quite 12 years old) participant in the Uprising fights. He was awarded the Polish Cross of Valour.

== Life story ==
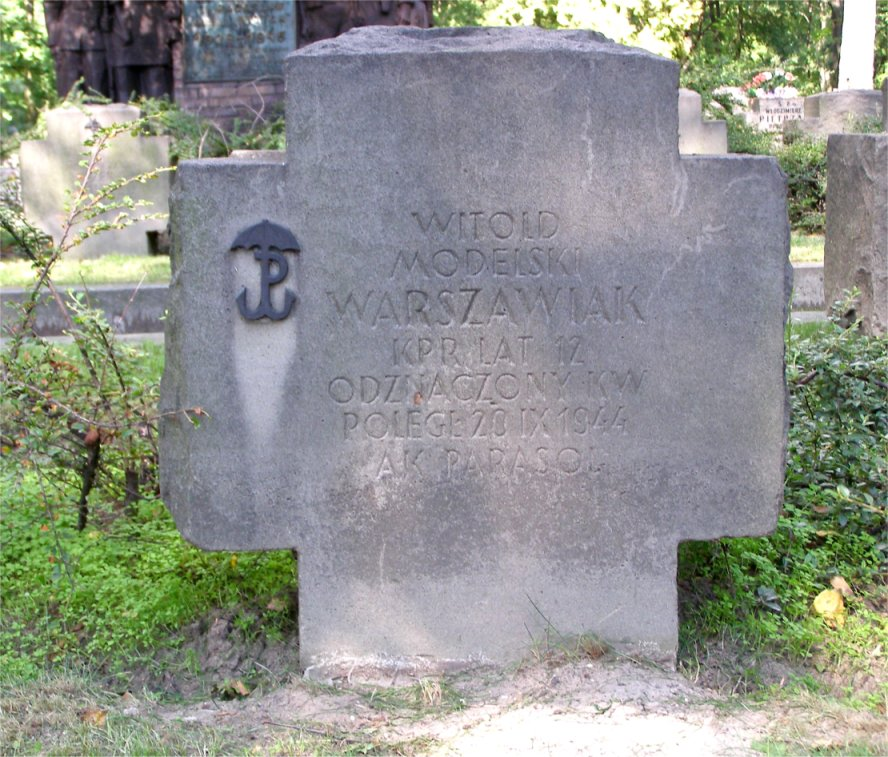
Witold Modelski's grave in Powązki Military Cemetery in Warsaw

During the Second World War, after the Modelski family's house on Nowy Świat Street had burnt down, all the family moved to Leszno Street, where Witold had been cared for by his mother Jadwiga Maria Modelska until the Warsaw Uprising broke out.

At the beginning of August 1944, Witold Modelski joined the Parasol Battalion, a part of the Radosław Group, precisely the 4^{th} platoon of the 1^{st} company. When the Wola district collapsed, he transferred to The North Group, a part of the Gozdawa Battalion – Sosna section (Note: Polish: Sosna → English: Pine), located in Warsaw Old Town (Note: Precisely he joined to the 2^{nd} onslaughting company.). Witold Modelski ended his martial fate on Czerniaków in the Parasol Battalion (Note: Back then a part of „Broda 53” Diversion Brigade.).

Modelski was uncommonly brave. On 23 August 1944, he was awarded the Cross of Valour and promoted to corporal. He died on 20 September on the Czerniaków Coast, in home on Wilanowska Street 1.

After the war, his mother, with the help of female emergency medical technicians from the Polish Red Cross, tracked down her son's body during the soldiers exhumation on the Upper Czerniaków Uprising. Under the cover of night she transported Witold on the Powązki Military Cemetery and buried him near the cemetery wall on her own. Only after several years later was his body moved into the plot reserved for soldiers and emergency medical technicians from the Parasol Battalion. The exact destination of his grave is the quarter A24-10-24.

His martial fate was described in books written by Zbigniew Wróblewski, such as Bakwiri z ulicy Leszno (English: Bakwiri from the Leszno Street) and Z jednego domu (English: From the same home), where there are numerous substantial mistakes, also including a myth that his family had allegedly fallen already in 1939.

Witold Modelski is the patron of the Little Insurrectionist Hall in Warsaw Uprising Museum.

== Externals ==
- Information on the website of Warsaw Uprising Museum (in Polish)
