= Władysław Kalkus =

Władysław Jan Kalkus
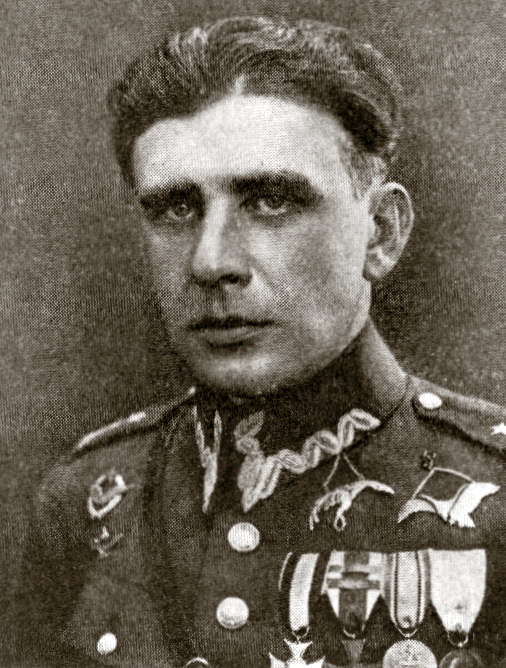
- Kalkus in 1925
- Born: 8 June 1892; Lwów, Austria-Hungary
- Died: 23 February 1945 (aged 52); Ormskirk, United Kingdom
- Burial place: Layton Cemetery
- Military career
- Allegiance: Austria-Hungary, Poland
- Branch: Army, Air Force
- Service years: 1913–1918 (Austria-Hungary); 1918–1945 (Poland)
- Rank: Brigadier-General

Władysław Jan Kalkus (8 June 1892 – 23 February 1945) was a Polish aviator and general.

He first gained distinction as an Austro-Hungarian Army officer in the First World War and at the war's end joined the new Polish Army. At his own request he was posted to the air force, commanding 581st, 5th, 17th and 6th Reconnaissance Squadrons and then the 2nd Aviation Regiment (2° Pułku Lotniczego). In September 1938 he led the 3rd Aerial Group in support of the Śląsk Independent Operational Group, which was tasked with annexing Trans-Olza from Czechoslovakia.

He was promoted to major general and succeeded general Ludomił Rayski as commander-in-chief of the Polish Air Force. That post also made him head of aerial defence in peacetime, whilst general Józef Zając was its head in time of war. He was in those posts during the invasion of Poland and reached France afterwards. From October 1939 to March 1940 he commanded all Polish Air Force units on French soil. In June 1940 he was succeeded by as supreme air force commander and in August as inspector general of the air force, in both cases by Stanisław Ujejski.

== Life ==
=== 1892–1919 ===
He was born in Lwów (now Lviv, Ukraine) to railway employee Paweł Piotr and his wife Joanna Płonki. He studied at the local lyceum, passed his school exam in Buchach and started study at the law faculty at the University of Leopoli for three semesters. As an Austro-Hungarian subject he joined its army on 1 October 1913 for one year's voluntary service. He was trained and educated at the reserve non-commissioned officers' school in Lviv.

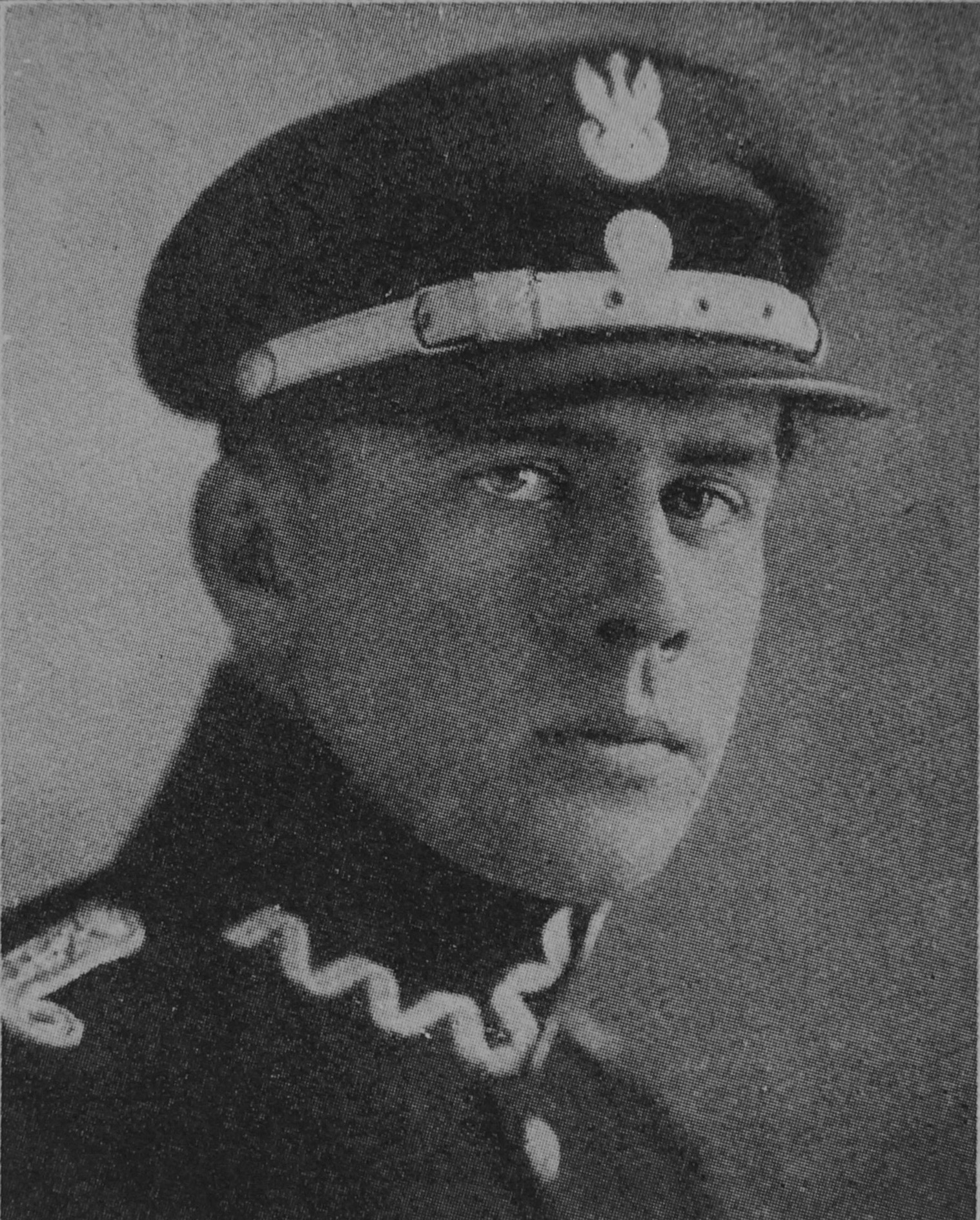
In pilot's uniform, 1920

He was mobilised on 1 August 1914 on the outbreak of the First World War and posted to the Eastern Front as a platoon commander in 30th Infantry Regiment. He and his platoon took part in several battles against the Russians and he was wounded in action. He convalesced and then returned to the front before being transferred to the Italian Front, where he was wounded again and spent a long time in hospital

Next he was on the Serbian Front and whilst on the frontline there he was promoted to reserve sub-lieutenant (1 May 1916) and reserve lieutenant (1 February 1918). Upon the end of the war and the dissolution of the Austro-Hungarian Empire he joined the Polish Army on 16 November 1918. He was a company commander in the defence of his native Lviv during the brief Polish-Ukrainian War.

=== Interwar ===
On 1 December 1918 he joined the nascent Polish Air Force at his own request. He attended the Military Aviation School in Warsaw and in February 1919 moved to the Pilots' School in Kraków, where he remained until January 1920. Whilst there, on 1 June 1919, he was promoted to captain.

At the end of his training he became a pilot and was put in command of 581 Reconnaissance Squadron, later commanding, 5th, 17th and 6th Reconnaissance Squadrons. From July 1921 to February 1923 he was a squadron commander and deputy commander of 2nd Aviation Regiment in Kraków. On 3 May 1922 he was commissioned as captain with seniority from 1 June 1919 and as 23rd in the Air Force. From February 1923 to September 1926 he was seconded to Centralnych Zakładach Lotniczych (C.Z.L.), an aircraft factory, where he held several positions. From September 1926 to April 1928 he commanded Aviation Department IV in the Ministry for Military Affairs. On 31 March 1924 he was promoted to major, and on 1 April 1924 posted to Air Navigation Department IV in the Ministry for Military Affairs.

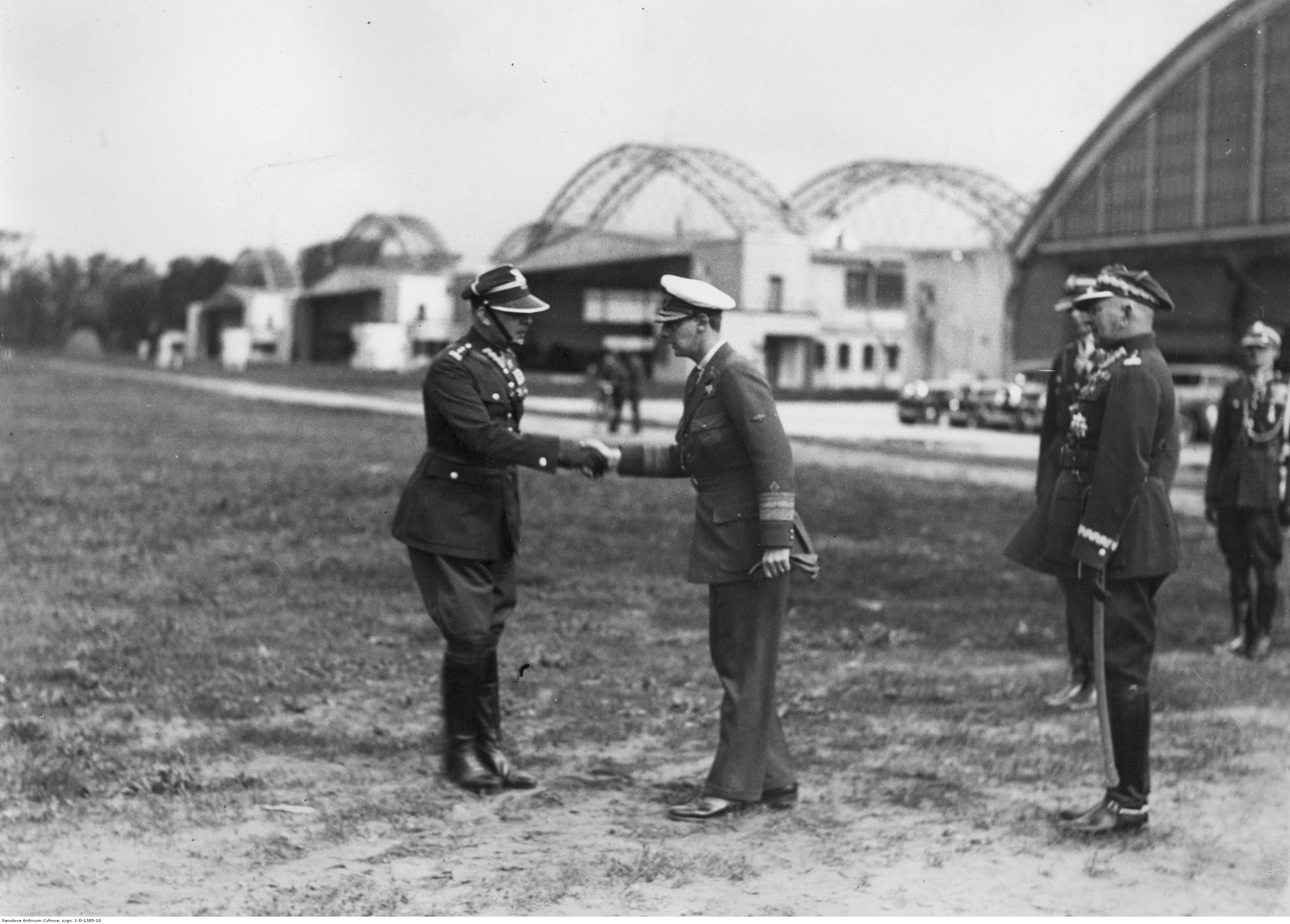
Welcoming Nicholas of Romania to the military airfield in Okęcie in 1933

In September 1926 he transferred to the cadre of air force pilots and also sent back to Aviation Department IV in the Ministry for Military Affairs as head of its personnel department. In November 1928 he was made vice-commander of 1st Aerial Regiment. From 29 December 1928 to 4 June 1929 he was on the course organised by the Military Centre for Advanced Studies in Warsaw (Note: According to Adam Kurowski students on the Centre's courses were not entitled to the title of Staff Officer. Kryska-Karski and Zurakowski state that - after completing his time at the Higher School of Aviation (April 1928 - April 1929) Kalkus had the title Staff Officer, citing his personal diary, even though the list of qualified officers for 15 April 1931 does not include him as a qualified officer. Also, the Aviation School was only held in 1936.) and on 23 January 1929 he was promoted to lieutenant colonel with seniority from 1 January 1929 to second place in the Air Force.

From April to June 1929 he was deputy commander of the 1st Aviation Regiment in Warsaw, whilst on 27 June the same year he was made commander of 3rd Aviation Regiment in Poznań, a role he held until November 1935. At the same time he was deputy commander of 2nd Aviation Group. From November 1935 he commanded 3rd Aviation Group in Kraków, then in Warsaw from 1 January 1938. In September 1938 he led 3rd Aerial Group's operations against Czechoslovakia.

=== Second World War ===
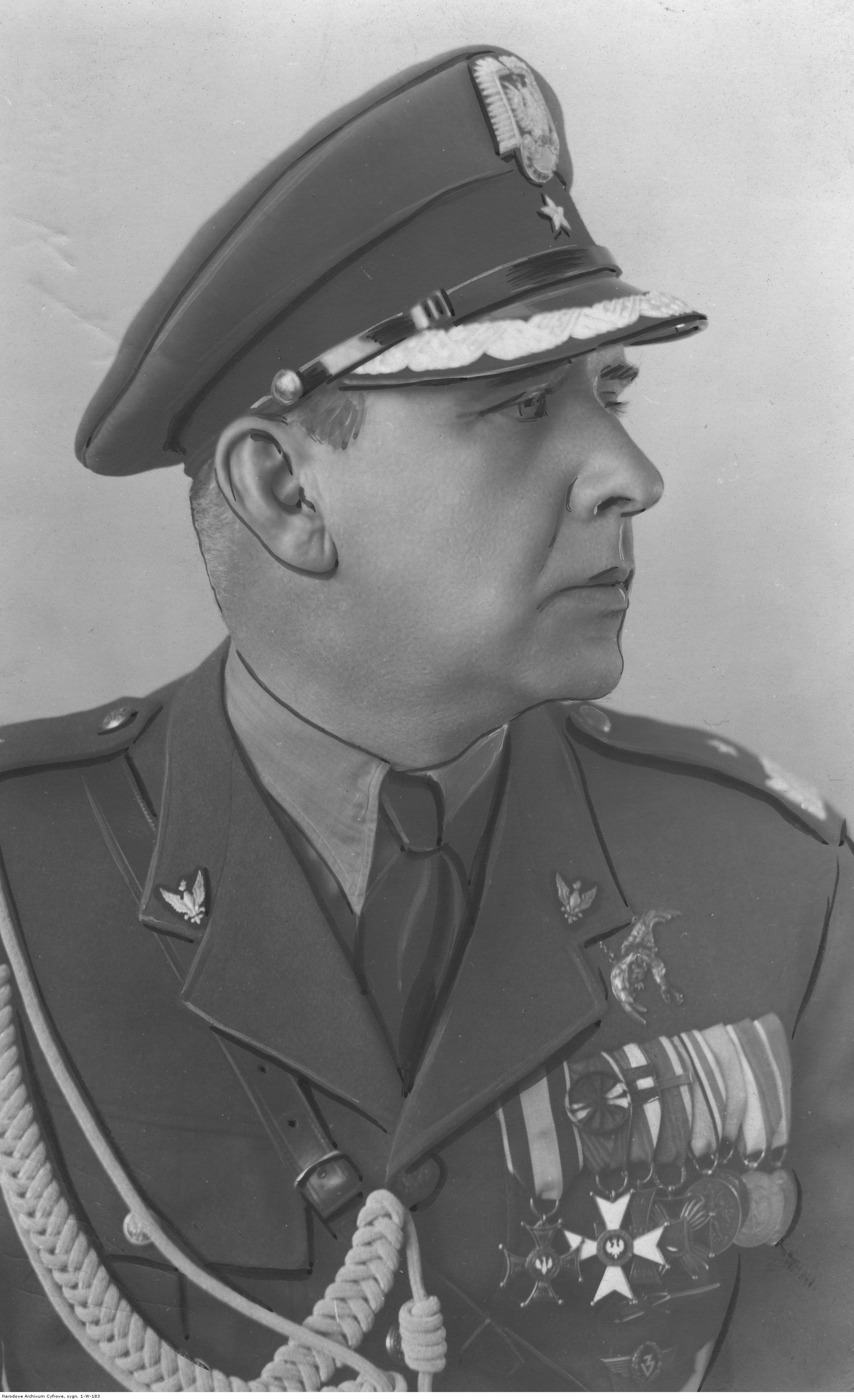
As a brigadier-general

On 19 March 1939 he was promoted to brigadier-general, and succeeded general Ludomił Rayski as commander of the airforce, holding that post throughout the invasion of Poland later that year. Just before Poland's surrender he ordered all able-bodied pilots and ground crew to escape to France via Romania to rebuild the Polish Air Force there. He and general Zajac also did so, as did Kalkus' son Wacław Stanisław (1922–1943) who had also joined the air force.

From October 1939 to March 1940 he continued as commander of the Polish Air Force in France (officially re-formed on 4 January 1940), collaborating with Zajac on air defence. He moved to the United Kingdom in March 1940 to become its inspector-general and deputy commander of the Polish Air Force units already stationed there. He left both posts after the fall of France in favour of Stanisław Ujejski From August 1940 to April 1941 was given no operational commands and he and general Rayski both also spent a short time at Officer Concentration Station Rothesay. From 22 January 1941 to 12 April 1942 he commanded No. 18 OTU in Bramcote.

From April 1942 to January 1944, he was in command of a Polish airbase of RAF Squires Gate near Blackpool, leaving the post for health reasons but remaining at the disposal of the Polish Air Force in the West until his death. His son had become a lieutenant and flew with No. 301 Polish Bomber Squadron until being killed in a 1943 raid on the occupied Netherlands when his plane was shot down by a night fighter. He is buried in Amsterdam. Whilst in the United Kingdom, Kalkus was diagnosed with cancer and his doctors had him admitted to the military hospital in Ormskirk near Blackpool, where he died in 1945. He was buried in the Polish military section of Layton Cemetery.

== Honours ==
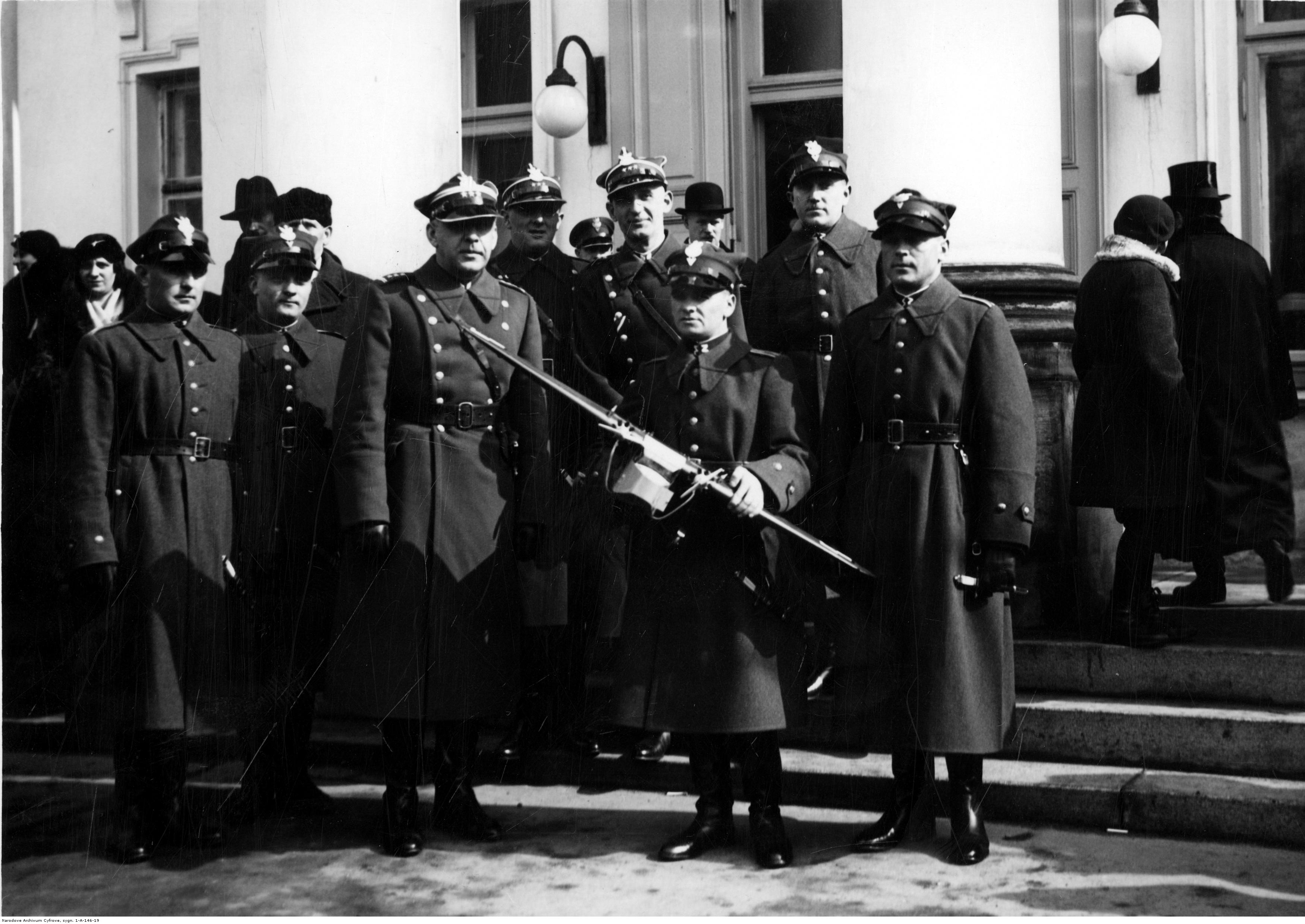
A delegation from 1st Aviation Regiment at name-day celebrations for Józef Piłsudski in 1935 in the courtyard of the Belweder – Kalkus is third from left.

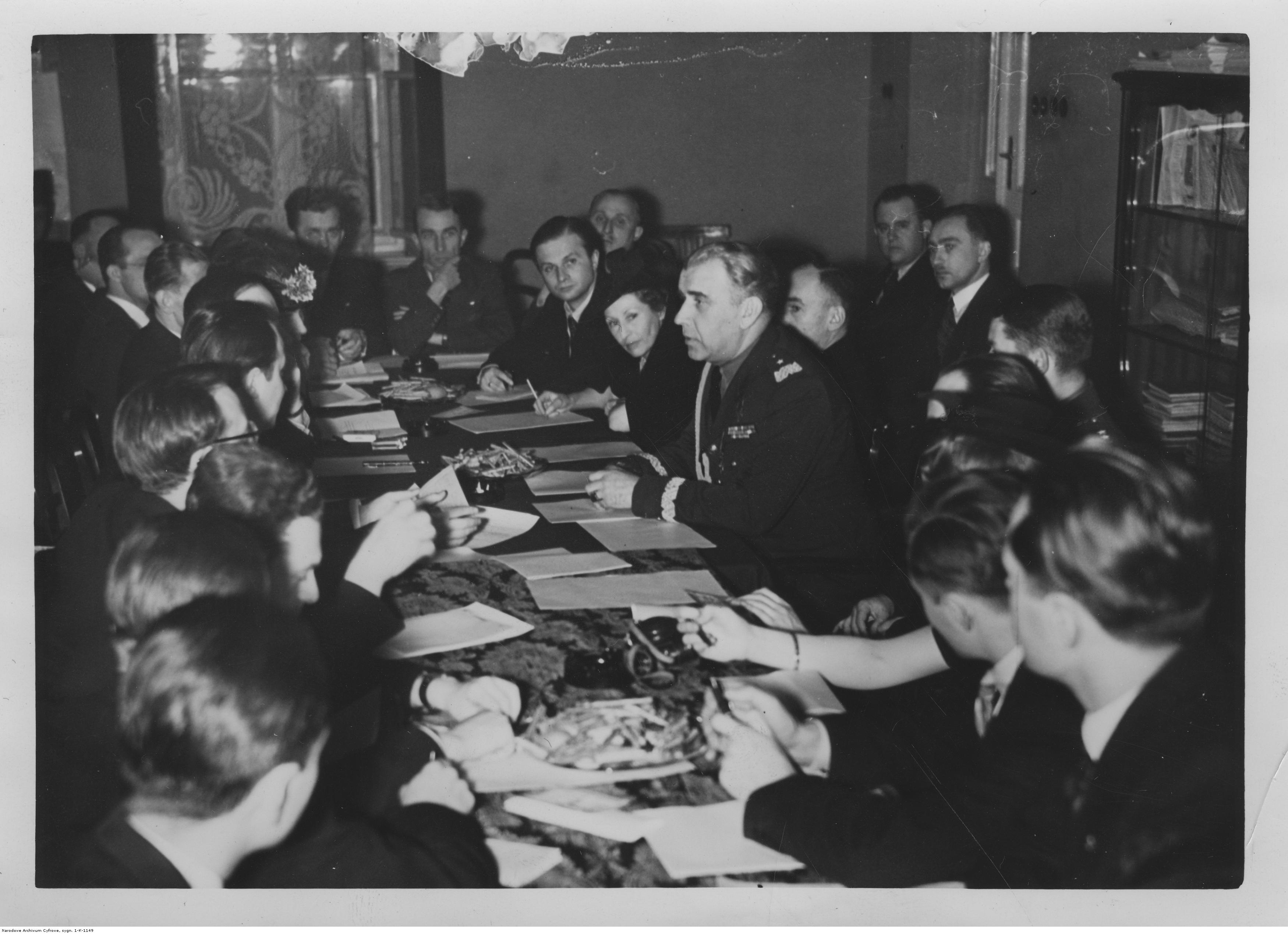
With journalists on being put in command of military aviation in March 1939

=== Polish ===
- Order of Polonia Restituta, Officer, 11 November 1936
- Virtuti Militari, Silver Cross, n. 372
- Cross of Valour (3)
- Cross of Merit (2)
- Commemorative Medal for the War of 1918–1921
- Medal for the Tenth Anniversary of Regained Independence
- Badge of Honour of the Air and Anti-Gas Defence League
- Field Pilot Badge No. 11 (11 November 1928) "for combat flights over enemy during the war of 1918–1920"

=== Other ===
- Military Merit Cross, 3rd class, with war decorations and swords, twice (Austria-Hungary)
- Military Merit Medal, silver, with "Signum Laudis" swords (Austria-Hungary)
- Pilot Badge (France, 1927)
- Pilot Badge (Italy, 21 March 1928)
- Pilot Badge (Bulgaria, 11 November 1936)
- Order of the Star of Romania, Officer's Cross, 11 November 1936
- Order of the British Empire, Commander (United Kingdom)
