= Stanisław Rawicz-Dziewulski =

Polish Army general (1869 - 1939)

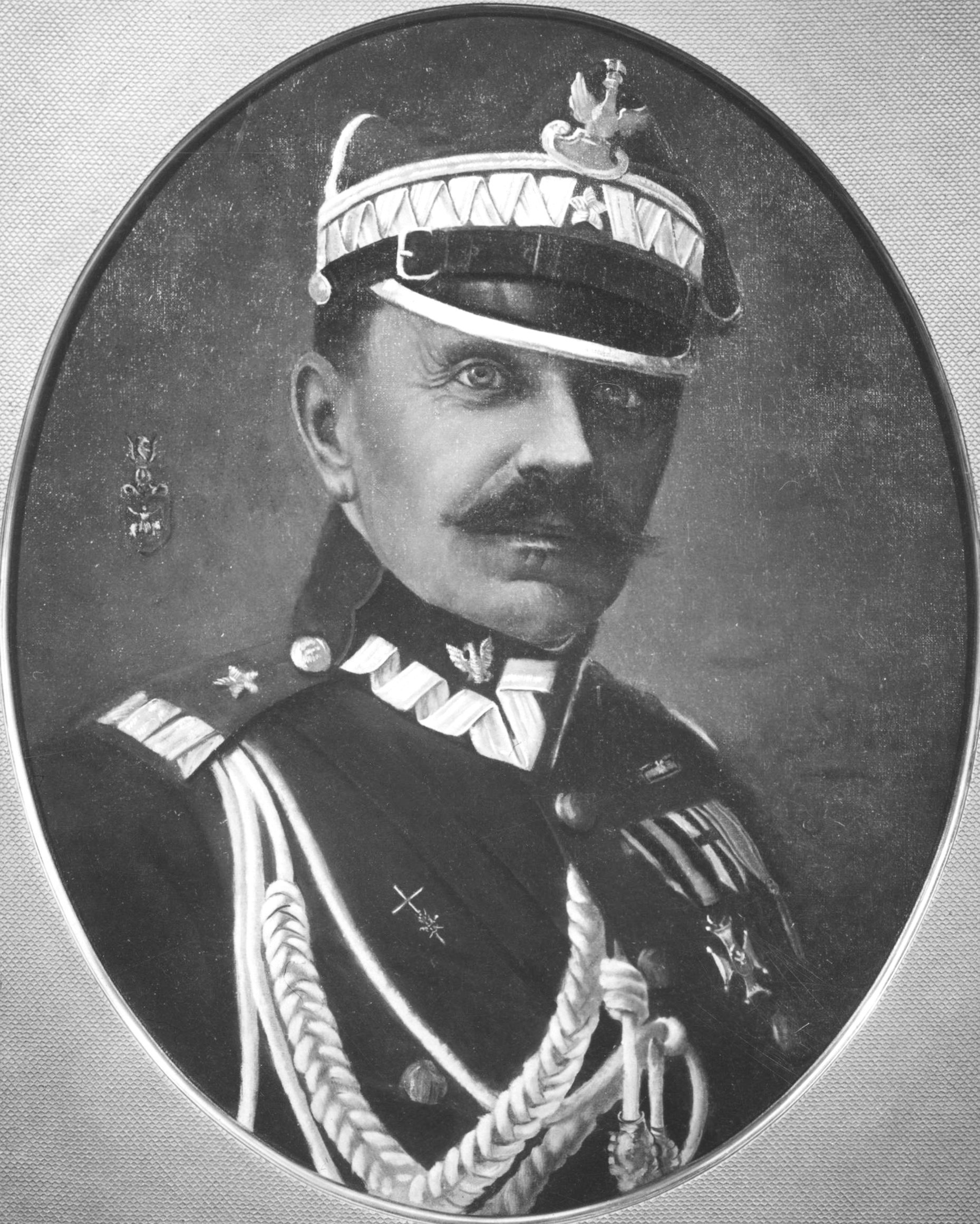
- Born: 6 November 1869; Okniny, Łuków County
- Died: 18 October 1939 (aged 69); Warsaw
- Burial place: Powązki Military Cemetery
- Military career
- Branch: Imperial Russian Army; Polish Army
- Rank: Brigadier general
- Units: 1st Polish Corps in Russia, 4th Niemen Uhlan Regiment
- Conflicts: World War I Polish–Soviet War; World War II
- Awards: Virtuti Militari, Cross of Valour

Stanisław Rawicz-Dziewulski of the Rawicz coat of arms (born November 6, 1869, died October 18, 1939) was a brigadier general of the Polish Army, knight of the Order of Virtuti Militari.

== Biography ==
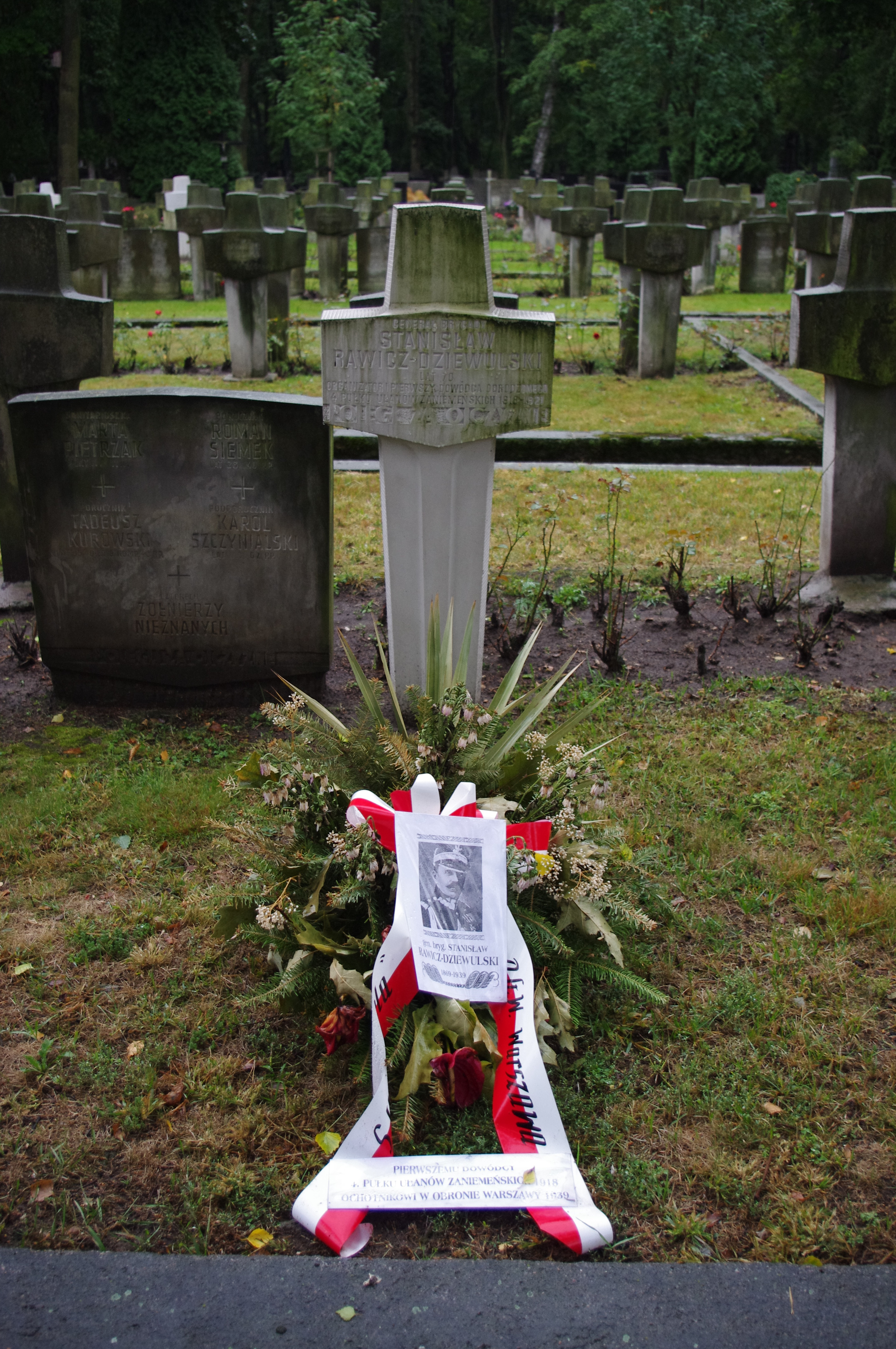
The grave of Rawicz-Dziewulski at the Powązki Military Cemetery

He graduated from the Officers' Cavalry School in Yelizavetgrad and from 1894 a professional officer of the Russian cavalry. Squadron commander and captain (1914). During World War I, he fought on the German front in various positions. In December 1916, he was promoted to colonel, and in July 1917 he took command of a cavalry regiment. In the period from December 1917 to May 1918, commander of the Knights' Cavalry Legion in the 1st Polish Corps in Russia.

From November 1918 following the regaining of independence and the establishment of the Second Polish Republic he became part of the newly established the Polish Army, organizer and commander of the 4th Uhlan Regiment. In February 1919 following the liberation Białystok and its inclusion in Poland he became the first commandant of the Białystok Garrison. Later he became commander of the 2nd Cavalry Brigade on the Bolshevik front. On May 29, 1920, he was confirmed as of April 1, 1920, in the rank of colonel, in the cavalry, in the group of officers of the former Eastern Corps and the former Russian Imperial Army. On May 1, 1921, he was retired, in the rank of colonel. He settled in Warsaw.

On October 26, 1923, the president of Poland, Stanisław Wojciechowski, confirmed him in the rank of brigadier general with seniority as of June 1, 1919 in the corps of generals.

During the September campaign, he reported for service, joined the fight in defense of the capital. He died as a result of his wound and was buried at the Powązki Military Cemetery in Warsaw (section B10-1-15).
