= Stefan Dembiński =

Polish general

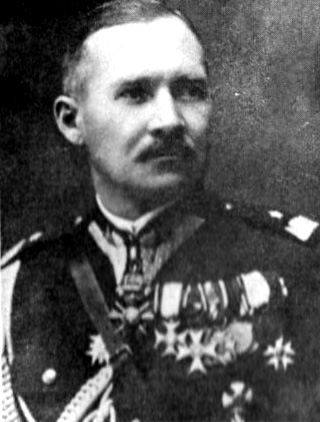
- Stefan Dembiński picture
- Born: September 30, 1887; Nowe Sioło, Poland
- Died: March 27, 1972 (aged 84); London, United Kingdom
- Occupation: Polish general

Stefan Dembiński (30 September 1887 – 27 March 1972) was a Polish general.

He fought in the World War I in the Austro-Hungarian Army, and took part in the Polish Defensive War in 1939. He was the General Inspector of the Armed Forces from 1964 to 1972 in the Polish government in exile.

== Honours and awards ==
- Silver Crosses of the Virtuti Militari
- Grand Cross of the Order of Polonia Restituta (formerly awarded the Knight's Cross)
- Cross of Valour (four times)
- Gold Cross of Merit
