= Piotr Trytek =

Polish general

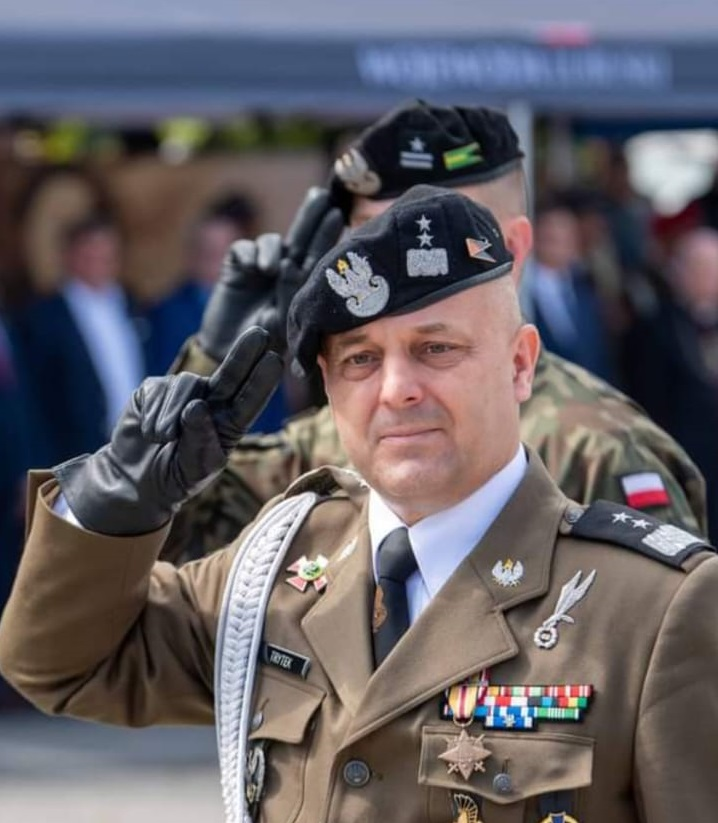
- Piotr Trytek (2019)
- Born: October 16, 1971 (age 54); Stargard, Poland
- Military career
- Allegiance: Poland
- Branch: Polish Land Forces
- Service years: 1990 - present
- Rank: Major General
- Commands: 11th Lubuska Armored Cavalry Division
- Conflicts: Occupation of Iraq (2003–2011): War in Afghanistan

Piotr Trytek is a general of the Poland Land Forces. He was appointed by the European Union on 28 October 2022 to lead its mission for training Ukrainian troops during the 2022 Russian invasion of Ukraine, EUMAM Ukraine.

As of October 2022 Trytek is commander of the Polish Armed Force’s 11th Lubuska Armored Cavalry Division, and served as part of the missions in Iraq and Afghanistan.

== Education ==
Piotr Trytek graduated from the Higher School of Mechanized Forces Officers (1994), higher education at the Faculty of Land Forces, Command and Staff Studies at the National Defense University (2002), postgraduate studies in strategic and operational studies at the National Defense University (2013), postgraduate studies in defense policy at the War Studies Academy (2018).

== Military career ==
He began his military service in 1994 as a platoon commander in the 6th Mechanized Regiment in Wałcz. Then, from 1995, he was a company commander in the 2nd Mechanized Brigade of the Legions named after Marshal Józef Piłsudski in Wałcz. After completing his studies, he was sent in 2002 to the headquarters of the 6th Armored Cavalry Brigade in Stargard Szczeciński. In 2003, he was deputy battalion commander in the 2nd Mechanized Brigade. In 2006, he served as part of the 6th rotation of the Polish Military Contingent in Iraq as head of the operational section. In 2007, he took up the position of Chief of Staff of the 2nd Mechanized Brigade, which he held until December 2012. In the meantime, in 2008/2009, he served as Deputy Commander of the Contingent in the 4th rotation of the Polish Military Contingent in Afghanistan. In 2013, after completing postgraduate command and staff studies at the National Defense University, he was appointed Deputy Commander of the 2nd Mechanized Brigade. In 2014, he was Head of the Armed Forces Planning Department at the General Staff of the Polish Armed Forces in Warsaw.

On January 1, 2017, by decision of the Minister of National Defense, he was appointed Commander of the 12th Mechanized Brigade named after General Józef Haller in Szczecin. On August 15, 2018, by order of the President of the Republic of Poland of August 1, 2018, he was promoted to the rank of brigadier general. He received the act of appointment from the President of the Republic of Poland Andrzej Duda. On February 4, 2019, he was designated to the position of deputy head of the Armed Forces Development Planning and Programming Directorate at the General Staff of the Polish Armed Forces in Warsaw (P5). On October 1, 2020, he took over as commander of the 11th Armored Cavalry Division. On March 1, 2021, during the celebration of the National Remembrance Day of the "Cursed Soldiers", the President of the Republic of Poland Andrzej Duda promoted him to the rank of major general. On September 21, 2023, the Minister of National Defense Mariusz Błaszczak appointed him as the Inspector of the Land Forces of the General Command of the Branches of the Armed Forces, effective from September 29, 2023. He is interested in security issues and military history. He has a wife and two children.
