= Michał Tokarzewski-Karaszewicz =

Polish general (1893–1964)

Michał Karaszewicz-Tokarzewski
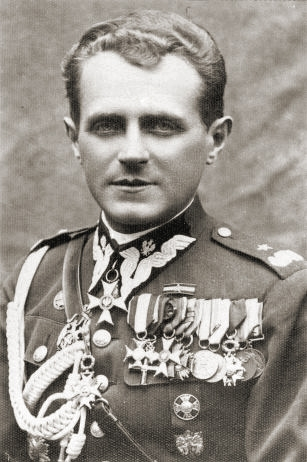
- Born: 5 January 1893; Lemberg, Austria-Hungary
- Died: 22 May 1964 (aged 71); Casablanca, Morocco
- Military career
- Allegiance: Austria-Hungary (1914-1917); Second Polish Republic (1918-1939); Polish Government in Exile (1940-1945)
- Branch: Polish Legions Polish Army Anders Army
- Service years: 1914-1945
- Rank: Major General
- Commands: 19th Infantry Division; 25th Infantry Division; 6th Infantry Division
- Awards: Virtuti Militari Commander's Cross Virtuti Militari Silver Medal Polonia Restituta Commander's Cross Polonia Restituta Knight's Cross Krzyz Niepodleglosci with Swords Krzyz Zaslugi

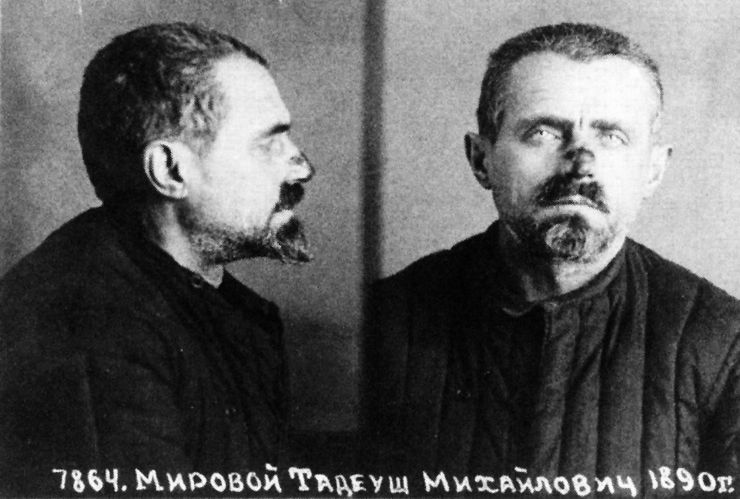
Michał Tokarzewski-Karaszewicz after arrest by NKVD 1940

General Michał Tadeusz Tokarzewski-Karaszewicz, Trąby coat of arms; pseudonyms Doktor, Stolarski, Torwid (5 January 1893, Lemberg – 22 May 1964, Casablanca, Morocco) was a Polish general and founder of the resistance movement Polish Victory Service.

== Early life ==
He was born on January 5, 1893, in Lviv as the son of Bolesław Wincenty Tokarzewski-Karaszewicz and Helena Lerch de Lechensfeld. Tokarzewski served in the Polish Legions from 1914 until 1917, then in the POW (Polish Military Organization). He was a commanding officer of the "5th Infantry Legion Regiment" during the Polish-Ukrainian War, which fought in Lwów.

During the November–December 1918 pogroms in Poland, Tokarzewski was removed from his post by the Polish Government as District Commander of Przemysl for posting a notice in which he fined the Jewish population 3,000,000 crowns as punishment for allegedly fighting against the Polish army, despite their assertion of neutrality. This charge was never proven.

The poster read: "An appeal to the population of Przemysl of Mosaic Confession. (ie, the Jewish population) "In view of a well-known fact that in the course of the struggle of recapturing Przemysl, the Jews, notwithstanding their repeated assertion of neutrality, took part in the fight with the Ukrainian forces and fired on the attacking police detachment.

"I order the Jewish community to deposit at the district headquarters of the Polish troops of Przemysl a sum of 3,000,000 crowns."

After Poland regained independence in 1918, Tokarzewski served in the Polish Army. In April 1919 he participated in the Polish-Soviet War when Wilno was seized by Poland. From 1924 until 1926 he was commanding the 19th Infantry Division in Wilno, from 1928 until 1932 a commanding officer of the 25th Infantry Division in Kalisz and from 1932 until 1939 a commanding officer of the Corps area (okreg korpusu) in Grodno, Lwów and Toruń.

== World War II ==
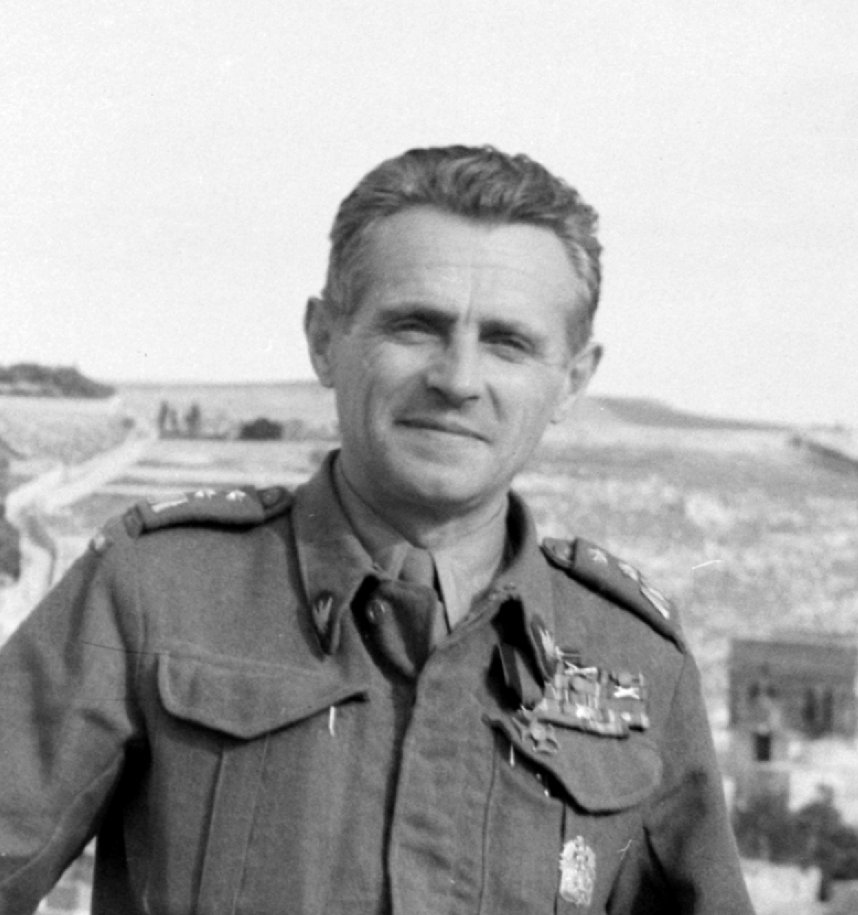
Michał Tokarzewski as the second in command of the Anders Army while in Jerusalem during World War II.

During the Polish Defensive War of 1939, he was commanding the Operation Group (grupa operacyjna) of the "Armia Pomorze" (Pomeranian Army). He fought in the Battle of Bzura and was the second-in-command of "Armia Warszawa" (Army Warsaw) which was commanded by general Juliusz Rómmel, during the defence of Warsaw.

In occupied Poland, on 27 September 1939 he founded the resistance movement "Służba Zwycięstwu Polski" (Polish Victory Service) and was its commander-in-chief until December 1939, when he became the commanding officer of the "3rd Lwów area (ZWZ)" under Soviet occupation. Crossing the new German–Soviet border, in March 1940 he was arrested and imprisoned by the NKVD.

After being released from prison, Tokarzewski was appointed a commanding officer of the "6th Infantry Division" of the Polish Army in the Soviet Union (Anders Army) in August 1941. From March 1943 until 1944 he served as the second-in-command of the Polish Army in the East. In 1944 he became a commander of the 3rd Polish Corps which was formed in Egypt.

== After World War II ==
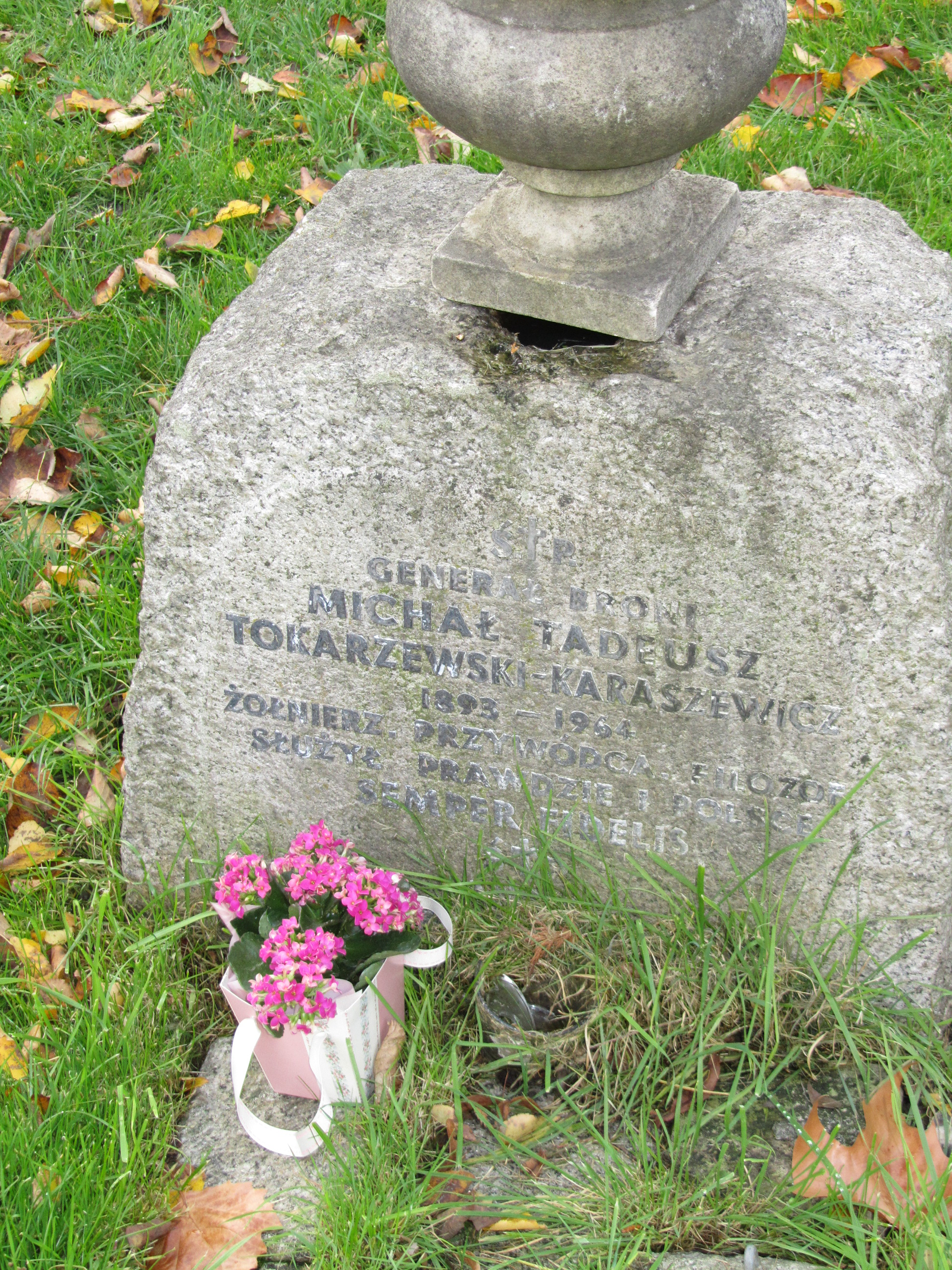
Michał Tokarzewski gravestone in Brompton Cemetery, London.

After the war he stayed in exile in England and settled in London. From 1954 on he was the General Inspector of the Armed Forces of the Polish forces in exile. He died on 22 May 1964 in Casablanca, Morocco. In September 1992 the urn with his ashes was transferred from Brompton Cemetery in London to Poland and buried at the Powązki Cemetery in Warsaw.

In 2006, General Tokarzewski's medals and battledress came up for public auction. Two Canadians, who were aware of the unfortunate history of Poland during World War II, were successful in their bid and brought the items to Canada. The two then donated the entire collection to "Poland and the Polish people" during a ceremony at the Polish Combatants' Association, Branch#20, in Toronto, Ontario, Canada. The collection was displayed at the Branch #20 museum until March, 2007, when it was shipped to Warsaw to be displayed in the Warsaw Military Museum in that city.

== Promotions ==
- Porucznik (Lieutenant) – 29 September 1914
- Kapitan (Captain) – 5 March 1915
- Pułkownik (Colonel) – 22 May 1920
- Generał brygady (Brigadier general) – 1 December 1924
- Generał dywizji (Major general) – 1 January 1943
- Generał broni (Lieutenant general) – 19 March 1964 (by the Polish authorities in exile)

== Awards ==
- Order of the White Eagle (posthumously in 1964 by the Polish authorities in exile)
- Commander of the Virtuti Militari Order
- Commander of the Order of Polonia Restituta
- Officer of the Order of Polonia Restituta
- Cross of Independence, with Swords
- Cross of Valour, 4 times
- Cross of Merit with Swords, twice
- Golden Cross of Merit
- Commemorative Medal for War 1918-1921
- Medal of the 10th Anniversary of Regained Independence
- Wound Decoration
- Grand Cross of Order of the Crown of Romania (Romania)
- Grand Officer of Order of the Three Stars (Latvia)
- Medal of the 10th Anniversary of the War of Independence (Latvia)
- Commander's Cross of Order of the White Eagle (Yugoslavia)
- Order of the Bath (United Kingdom)
- Chevalier of Legion of Honour (France)
- Victory Medal

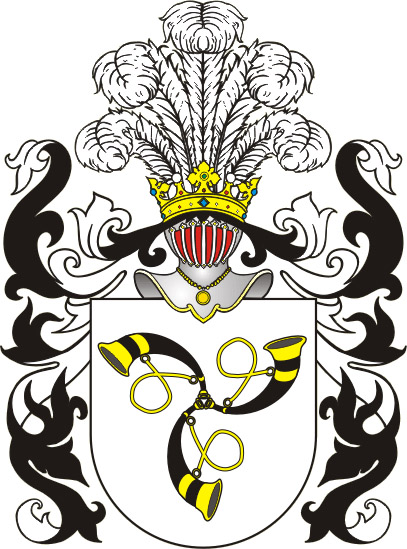
Traby Coat of Arms

Military offices
Preceded by Polish Resistance movement established	Commander of the Service for Poland's Victory; 1939–1940	Succeeded by Stefan Rowecki (Armia Krajowa)
Preceded by Władysław Anders	General Inspector of the Armed Forces; 1954–1964	Succeeded by Stefan Dembiński

== See also ==
- Armia Krajowa
