= Izydor Modelski =

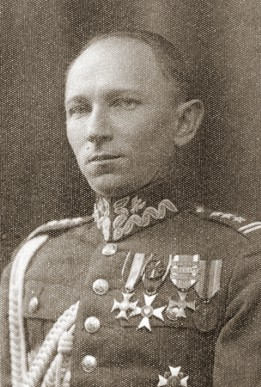
- Born: 10 May 1889; Lwów, Austria-Hungary (now Ukraine)
- Died: 25 October 1962; Washington, D.C., United States
- Military career
- Allegiance: Poland
- Rank: Lieutenant General

Izydor Modelski (May 10, 1889, in L'viv – September 25, 1962, in Washington, D.C.) was a Polish spy and a lieutenant general of the Polish Army. Modelski also completed a doctorate in philosophy at the University of Lviv in 1917. In 1946, he was sent to the United States to establish a spy ring. Defying an order to return to Poland in 1948, he testified about his actions to the House Un-American Activities Committee in 1949.

== See also ==
- Władysław Sikorski
- Stanisław Mikołajczyk
- Polish government-in-exile
- Sadyba
