= Stanisław Puchalski =

Austro Hungarian & Polish General

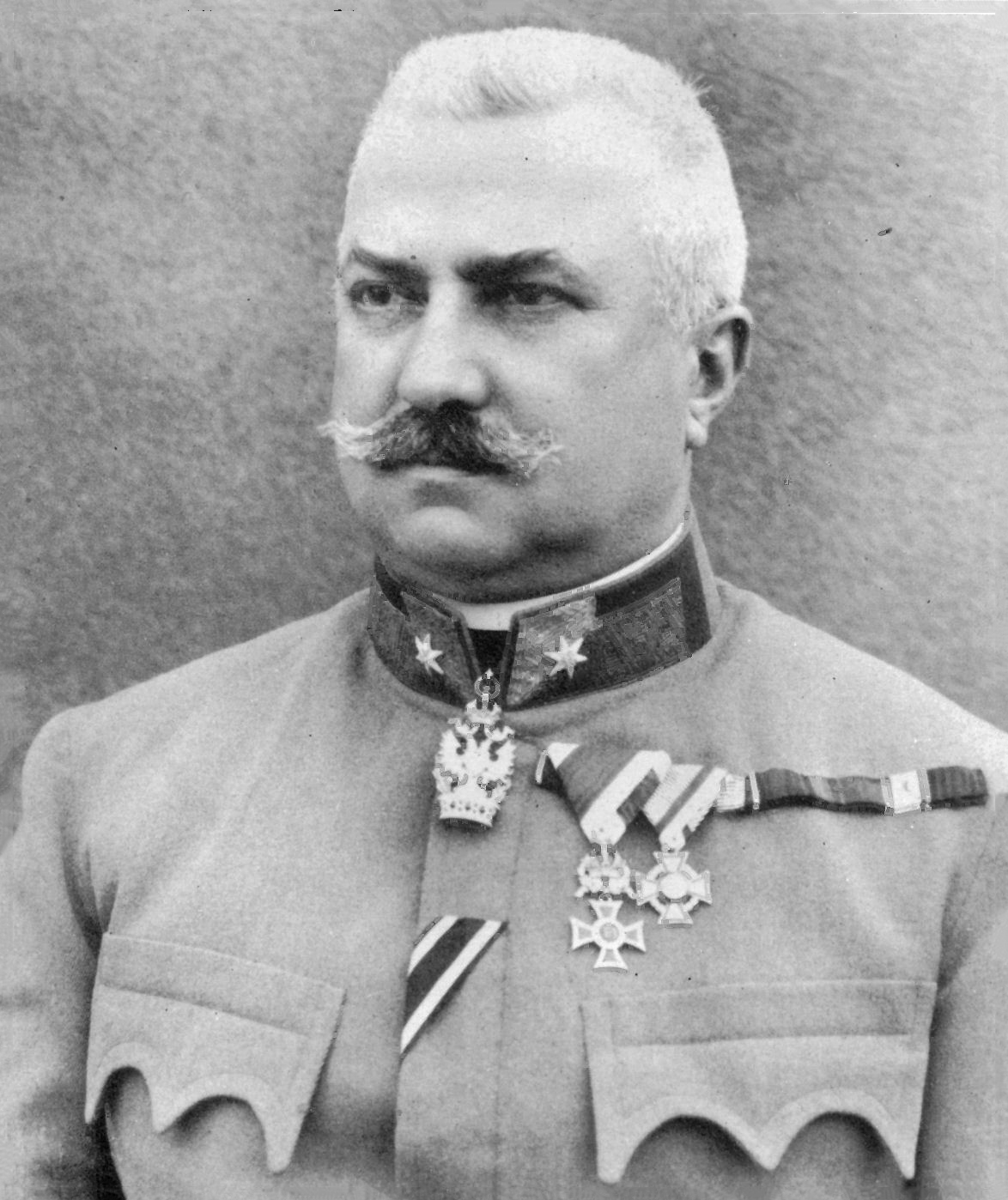
Stanisław Puchalski

Stanisław Puchalski, of Puchała coat of arms (5 January 1867, in Wapowce – 16 January 1931, in Warsaw) was an Austro-Hungarian and Polish general.
