= Błędów Desert =

Sandy Geographical Area in Poland

Coordinates: 50°21′22″N 19°31′03″E

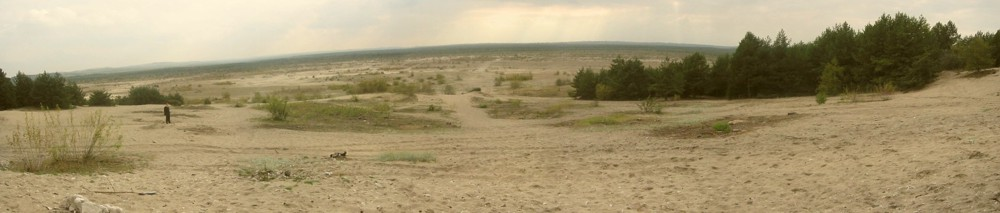
Błędów Desert

Błędów Desert (Polish: Pustynia Błędowska), is an area of sands and gravels located between Błędów (part of Dąbrowa Górnicza in Metropolis GZM) and the villages of Chechło and Klucze in Poland. The area lies mainly on the Silesian Highlands in the Lesser Poland Voivodeship. The Błędów Desert is Central Europe's largest accumulation of loose sand in an area away from any sea, deposited thousands of years ago by a melting glacier. It occupies an area of 32 km^{2} (12 sq mi). The sands have an average depth of 40 m, up to 70 m at the maximum. The Biała Przemsza River divides the desert in two from east to west. The northernmost part of the desert is closed to visitors because it is a military zone, where exercises take place.

The Błędów Desert was not created naturally, but rather as a result of human activity, which lowered the water table to such a degree that the ground could no longer support plant life. Beginning in the Middle Ages, the area's forests were aggressively cleared to meet the needs of local mining and metal working endeavors. This clearcutting exposed approx. 150 km^{2} of sand, which once reached as far south as Szczakowa.

According to legend, the desert was created by the Devil, who wanted to bury the nearby Olkusz silver mine in sand.

The desert was used as a military proving ground from the beginning of the 20th century. During the Second World War, the German Afrika Korps used the area to train soldiers and to test equipment before deployment in Africa. Military exercises continue in the area, including an airborne assault operation involving US, Canadian, and Polish forces in 2014.

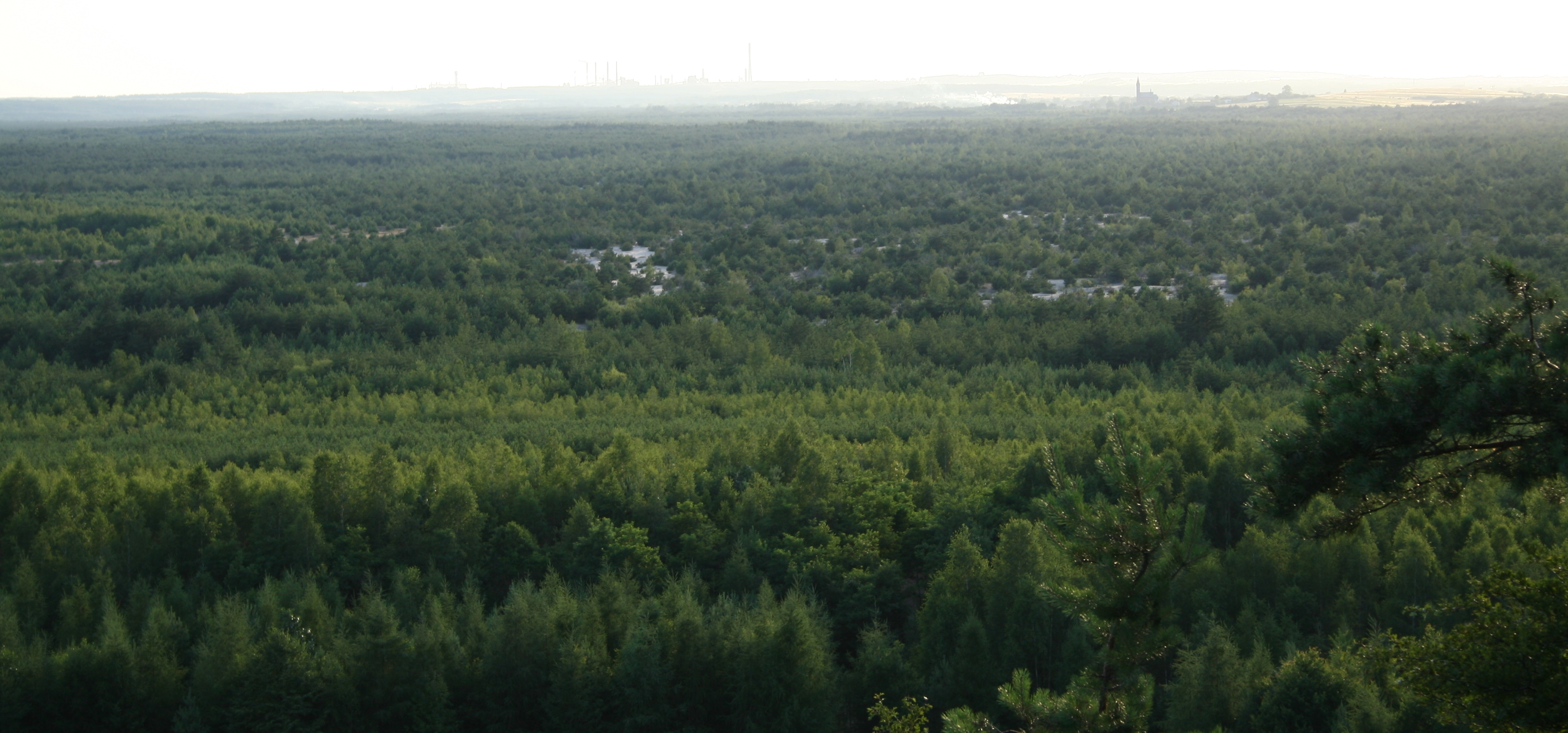
Błędów Desert seen from Czubatka, before preservation efforts.

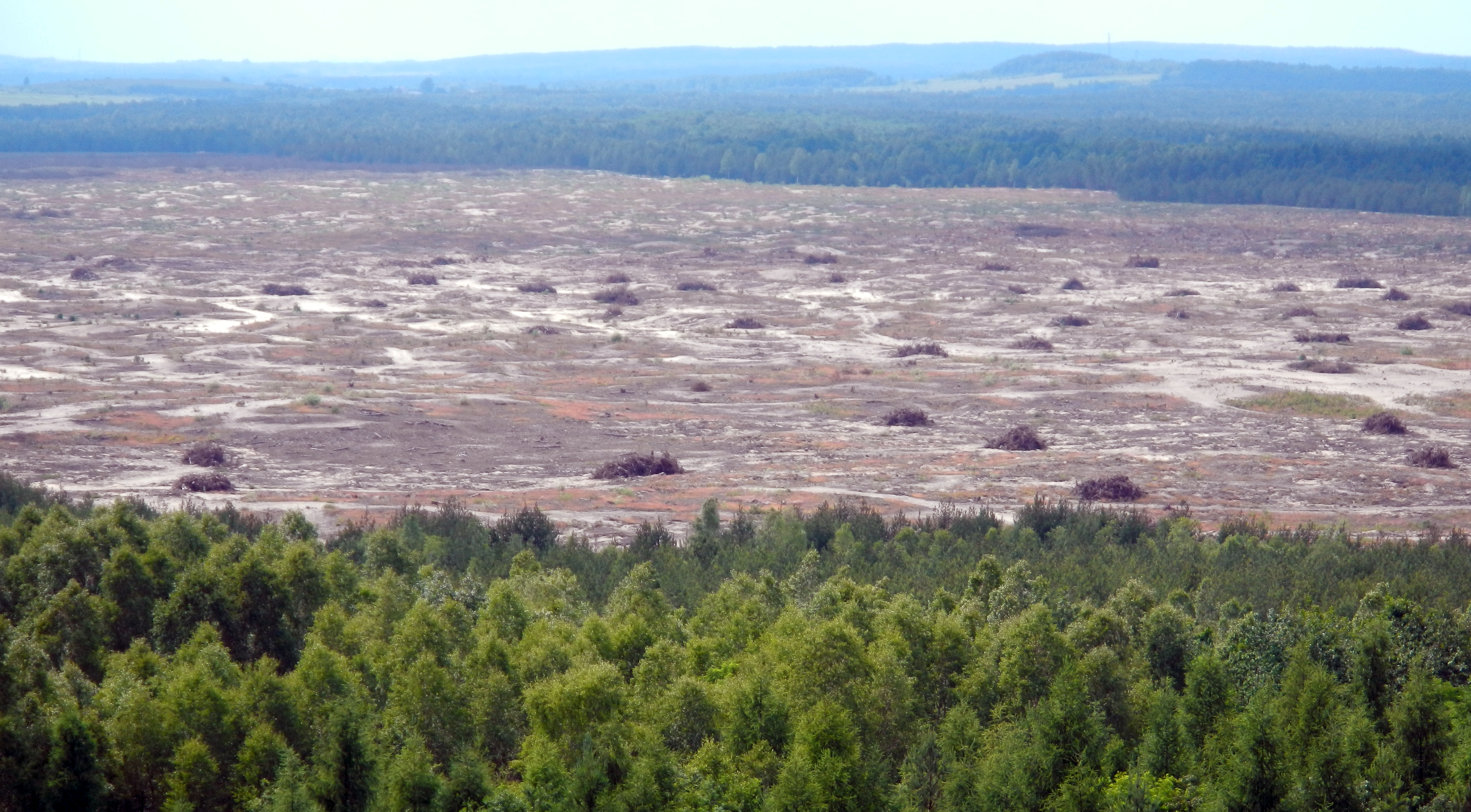
Błędów Desert seen from Czubatka, after preservation efforts.

In the centuries since its appearance, much of the Błędów Desert has been grown over. In 2013 and 2014 EU-led intentional preservation effort deforested some of the grown-over desert sands.

== Geography and climate ==
The average annual precipitation in the Błędów Desert is 726 mm, and the average temperature is 7.3º C, the precipitation value criteria for a desert does indicate that it's not technically a desert, however, the rare sight of big amounts of sand and desert phenomena occurring in previous years led to calling it a desert.

The desert is divided by an overgrown strip stretching along the bed of the White Przemsza River into two parts: northern - smaller and southern - larger. The sand is formed by fine quartz grains with numerous crumbs of other minerals. Most often they are polished to a shine. Among the attractions are fulgurites, which are minerals formed by the melting of sand by lightning striking the ground. At first glance, the landscape appears monotonous, but small dune formations and the valley of the Biala Przemsza River add variety to the area.

Until recently, phenomena characteristic of natural deserts, such as Fata Morgana or sandstorms, and dunes could be observed in the area. The current desert landscape is becoming less desert-like. A pine forest grows around it, and the overgrown former dunes resemble a meadow. In addition, the current appearance has been influenced by the planting of young pine and birch trees in the western part of the desert. Only near Klucze in the eastern part of the desert and in the north, in the vicinity of Dąbrówka Hill near Chechło, are there larger sandbanks.

Among the important European habitat types listed in Annex I of the Habitats Directive, the Błędów Desert area includes:

- inland dunes with sand grasslands,
- thermophilous inland sand grasslands,
- willow, poplar, alder and ash forests

== History ==
=== Environment ===
During the Ice Age, sands and gravels were deposited in the area of today's desert. Subsequently, the area was overgrown with dense forest, which was exploited for the silver and lead mines operating in the Olkusz area since the 13th century. Logging and groundwater extraction led to the creation of desert areas. At the beginning of the 20th century, the phenomenon of fatamorgana and sandstorms were observed here. Old photographs featuring the Błędów Desert show tall sand dunes that wandered through the desert, which allowed it to serve, among other things, as an open-air location for the filming of "Pharaoh" by Boleslaw Prus. In the 1950s, much of the desert was planted with pine and holly willow to consolidate the local volatile sands and protect the surrounding fields from being buried by sand. This led to the disappearance of most of the desert area.

The first geomorphological investigations, carried out at the end of the 1950s, proved that the Błędów Desert – as today – was composed of two significantly varying parts: northern and southern ones, divided by an “oasis-like” area – a humid, green valley of the Biała Przemsza River. The northern part of „the desert” was characterised, as now, by a dominating, typical deflation relief. While a system of dunes, transverse in the western part and longitudinal in the eastern part, at various stages of development existed within the limit of the southern part of the area. Among the dunes more or less vast deflation surfaces and basins occurred. The area of the Błędów Desert is surrounded in the north and south by forest complexes. The neighborhood of forests is also characteristic of a part of the edge of the Biała Przemsza valley vicinity. Hence, characteristic dune border ridges have been formed on the verge between the flat sandy surface and the forest. Since the 1960s, the area of the Błędów Desert has started to change rapidly, due to secondary human interference, into a “desert” environment. However, that interference was completely different than it had been before. The vegetation was not destroyed but intensively planted to stabilize quick sands. There were mainly shrubs of willows Salix acutifolia and S. arenaria, as well as pines (Pinus sylvestris) and alders (Alnus).

Since the 1970s, hydrological and hydrogeological conditions in the discussed area have also changed significantly. Until the mentioned year, the ground water level had been 3–8 m below the level of the ground. Later, it lowered abruptly by 20–30 m due to currentdeep exploitation of zinc and lead ores occurring in the neighborhood. However, the change of those conditions has not caused any changes in vegetation as the aforementioned species have adapted to the new water regime and continued to grow under arid conditions.

In 40 years (in 1995), due to the mentioned human interference and also due to natural succession and expansion of willow shrubs and grass vegetation, the areas covered by plants have significantly increased. Young pine forests and psammophilous vegetation (mainly Corynephorus canescens, Koeleria glauca, Festuca ovina, rarely Elymus arenarius) with Salix acutifolia shrubs and S. arenaria covered almost the whole investigated area and the previous young forests had changed into mature ones . Therefore, the unique “desert“ character of Błędów Desert has almost completely disappeared. In the years 2004–2005), the areas without vegetation – old active deflation basins (in SE part of the “desert”) were minute, they do not play their morphogenetic role and they are covered by clumps of Salix arenaria, forming characteristic phytogenic hills.

Today, efforts are underway to prevent overgrowth and preserve the desert's unique landscape. Livestock grazing is also planned to prevent its overgrowth.

=== Military use ===
The Błędów Desert became a regular training ground only in the interwar years of the 20th century, however, it had episodically been used by the military even earlier. On November 15, 1914 soldiers of the 4th Battalion of the Polish Legions practiced here just before marching to Krzywopłoty, where they fought a famous battle with Russian troops.

In the interwar period, the Polish Air Force regularly practiced in the Błędów Desert. Flights over the sandy training ground were performed by squadrons of fighters and bombers from the 2nd Aviation Regiment from Krakow. The exercises mostly consisted of firing shots at ground targets - targets and mock-up aircraft.

In June 1939, there was a serious accident with a PZL 23 Karaś aircraft, whose three-person crew was killed.

During World War II, testing of aerial weapons took place on the desert. The weapons, originating from the German training ground "Schendek" (Zendek), built near Pyrzowice, with a station "Udetfeld" experimental station, comparable in importance to the famous Peenemünde. It is also likely that tests of rocket weapons (V1 or V2), launched from the "Schendek" training ground. It is supposed to be confirmed by an AK intelligence report stating that five-ton missiles were delivered to "Udetfeld" rockets in March 1944. After World War II, the Błędów Desert again becomes a training ground for the Polish aviation and ground troops. Wrecked tanks and demobilized cannons were set up as targets for shelling, conducted from aircraft. Exercises were carried out on both parts of the desert - northern and southern.

Currently, paratroopers from the 6th Airborne Brigade in Krakow regularly train in the desert, holding exercises in landing and sham actions only in the northern part of the Błędów Desert, from the Chechło side (the boundaries of the military area, subject to a ban on entry, are indicated by appropriate signs in the area). Periodically, international military exercises also take place here. In 1999, NATO maneuvers were held here as part of Cooperative Bear '99, with the participation of aviation and medical services. In September 2016, American C-17 Globemaster were seen over the desert during aerial maneuvers. Maneuvers using the C-17 were also held in July 2021. Some of the planned exercises are reported the website of the 6th Airborne Brigade named after Brig. Gen. Stanislaw Sosabowski in Krakow.

== Flora ==
The area contains less than 100 species of various higher plants (vascular) adapted to sand soils and dynamic dune conditions. Examples of sandhill species include: grey hair-grass, Morison's spurry, Teesdalia nudicaulis, common whitlowgrass, marram grass, sand sedge and common myrtle. Rarer or protected species include: stemless thistle, prince's pine, broad-leaved helleborine, and Cochlearia polonica, which is a local endemic.

== Fauna ==
The desert fauna is mainly insects and birds (150 species). Among birds, the most noteworthy are the boric lark or the field pipit. The culms - desert-steppe birds - once nested on the sands. The White Przemsza River flows through the middle of the desert, where muskrats and beavers can be found and stream lampreys can be found in the river.

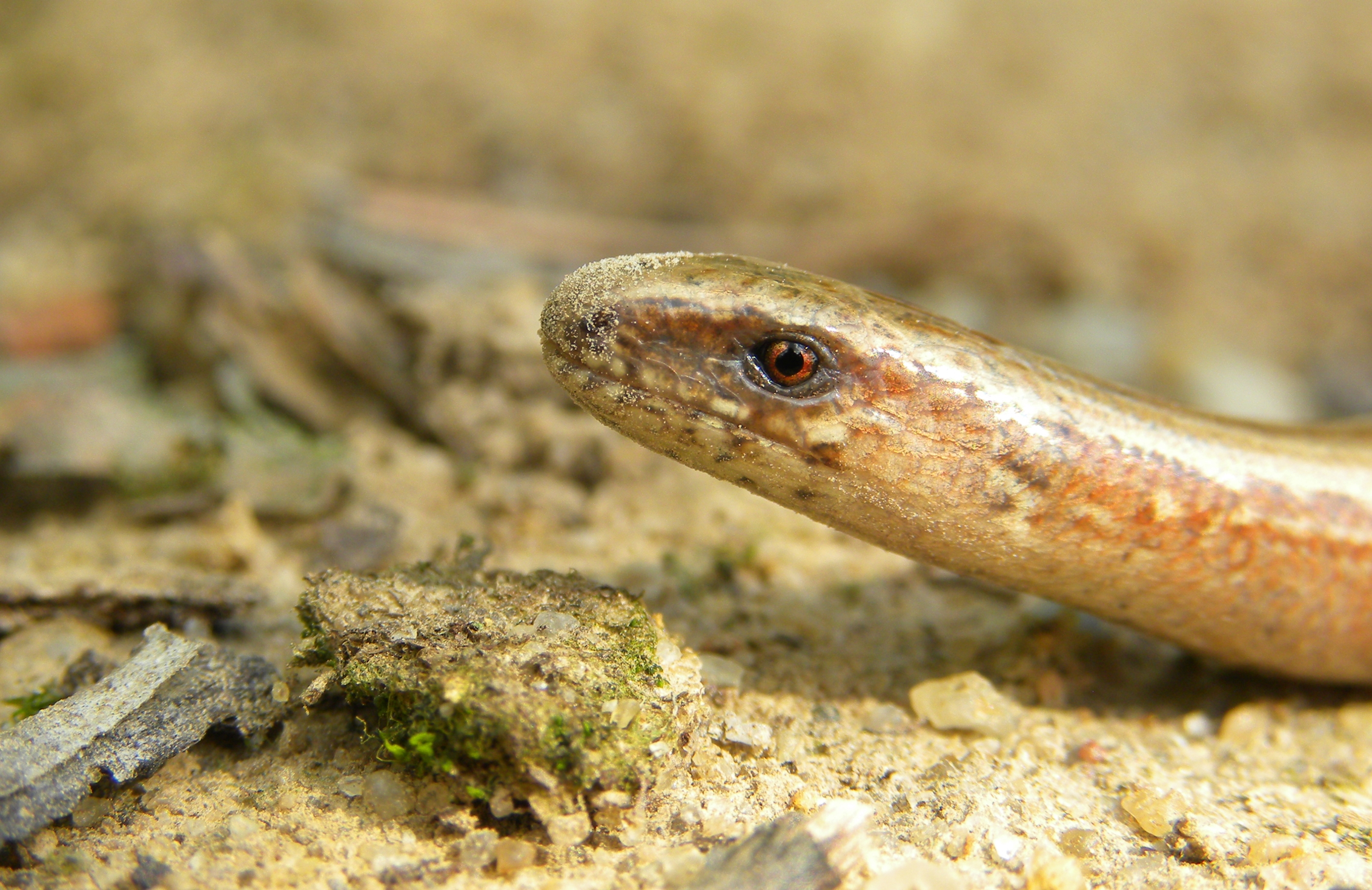
Slow-worm

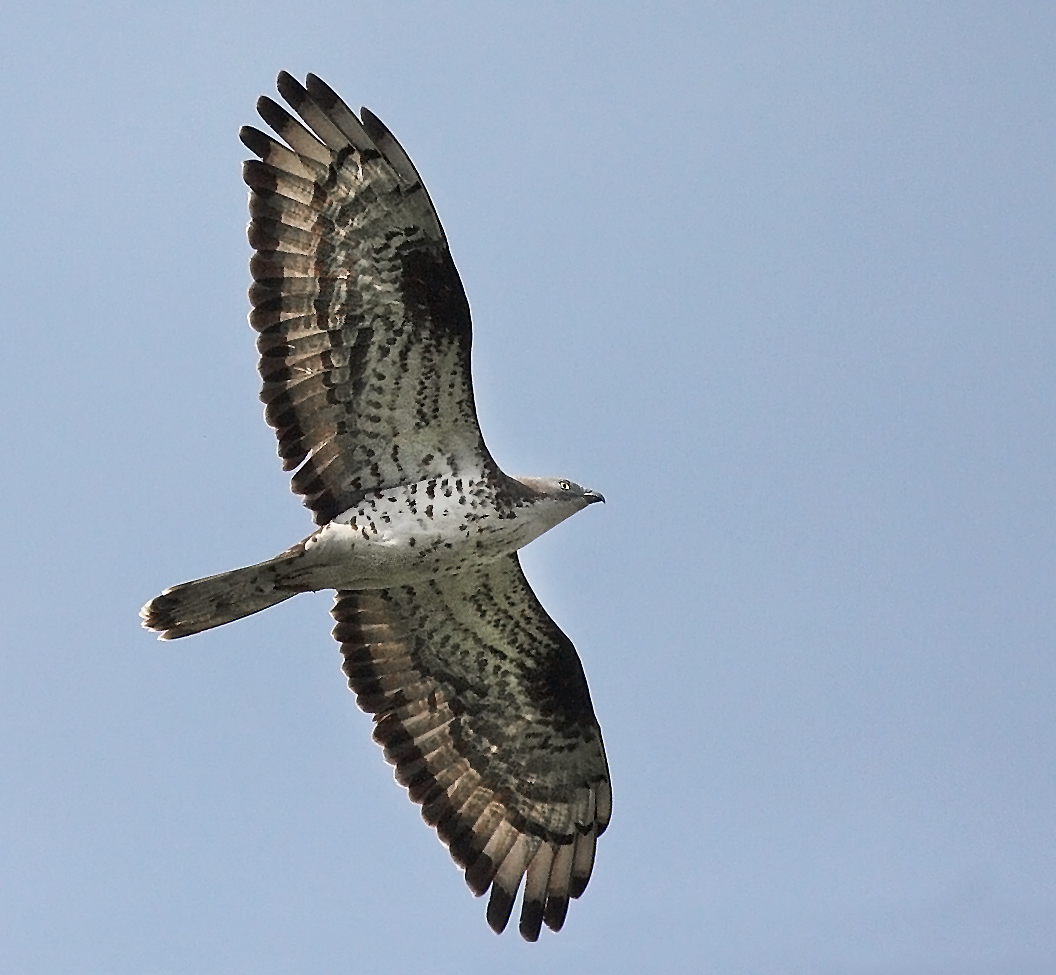
European Honey Buzzard

In the sands there are predatory northern dune tiger beetles - beetles of green or purple color with white spots on their lids. Antlions feed on loose sands; their larvae form funnel-shaped holes into which ants fall.

=== Birds ===
- European honey buzzard
- Common kingfisher
- Black woodpecker
- Barred warbler
- Red-backed Shrike
- Redshank
- European Nightjar
- Woodlark

=== Reptiles ===
- Smooth snake
- Sand lizard
- Slow worm
- Viviparous lizard
- Grass snake
- European adder

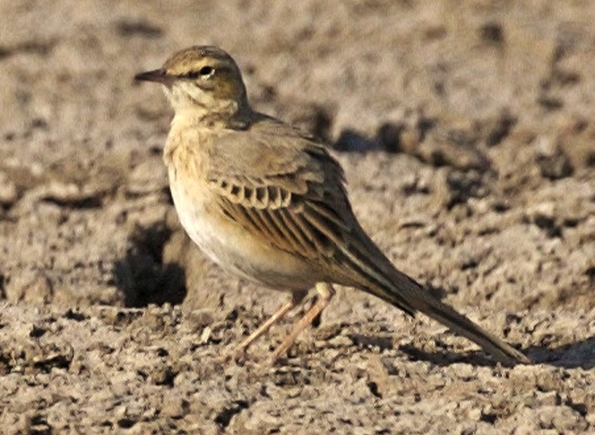
Woodlark

=== Amphibians ===
- Common spadefoot toad

=== Invertebrates ===
- Myrmeleon bore
- Hymenoptera
- Orthopteran
- Euroleon nostras (a species of Antlion that is well studied within the region)

== Tourism ==
=== Events ===
In the area of the desert, many cyclic events take place such as runs, family picnics and concerts.

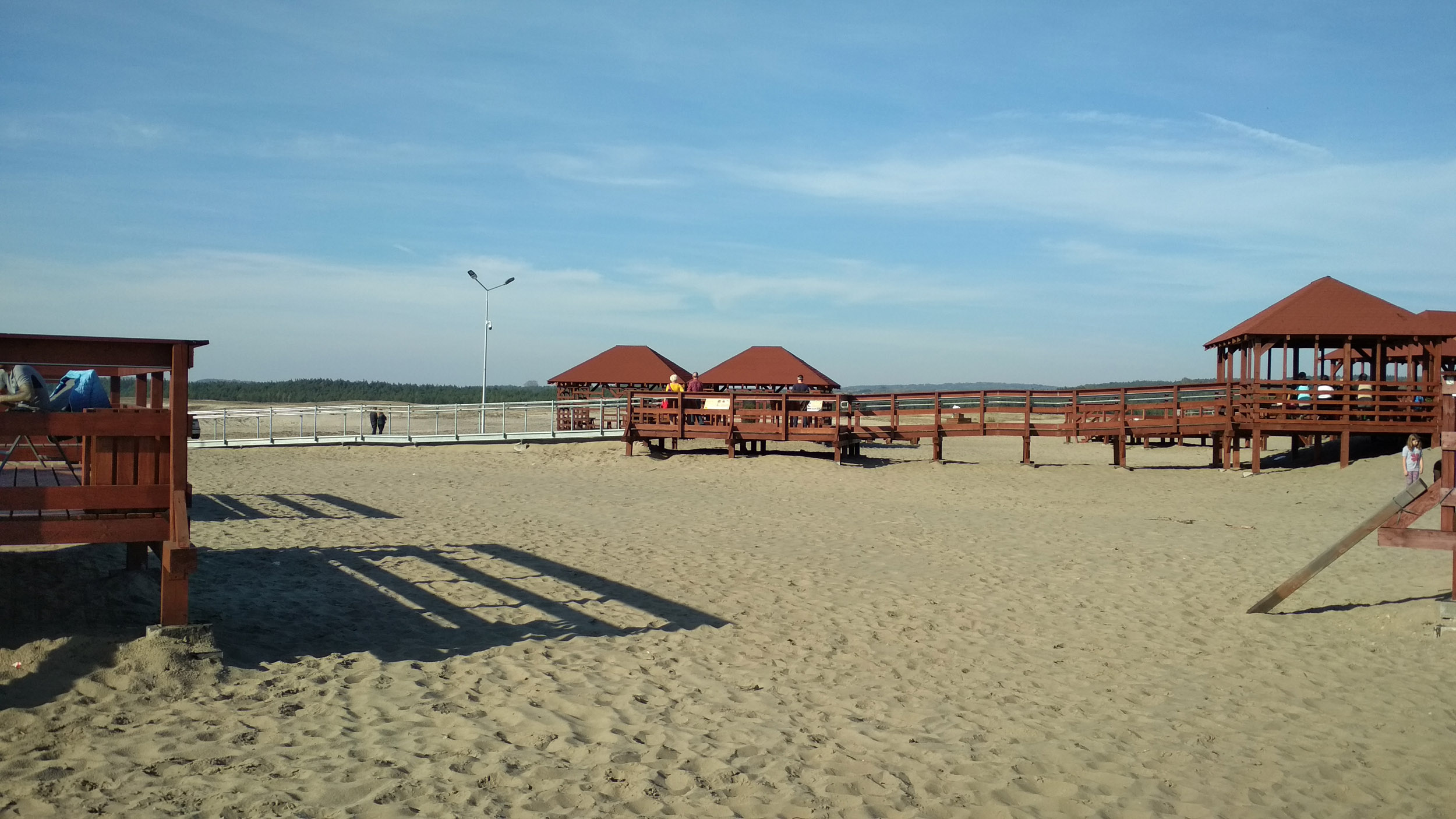
Wind Rose installation

=== Points of interest ===
==== The Wind Rose ====
A wooden installation with bridges and platforms shaped like a wind rose symbol located near the road connecting neighboring cities Klucze and Hutki. A tourist path leading to Klucze begins next to the installation. A common point of interest for events taking place on the desert.

==== Czubatka (382 m a.s.l) ====
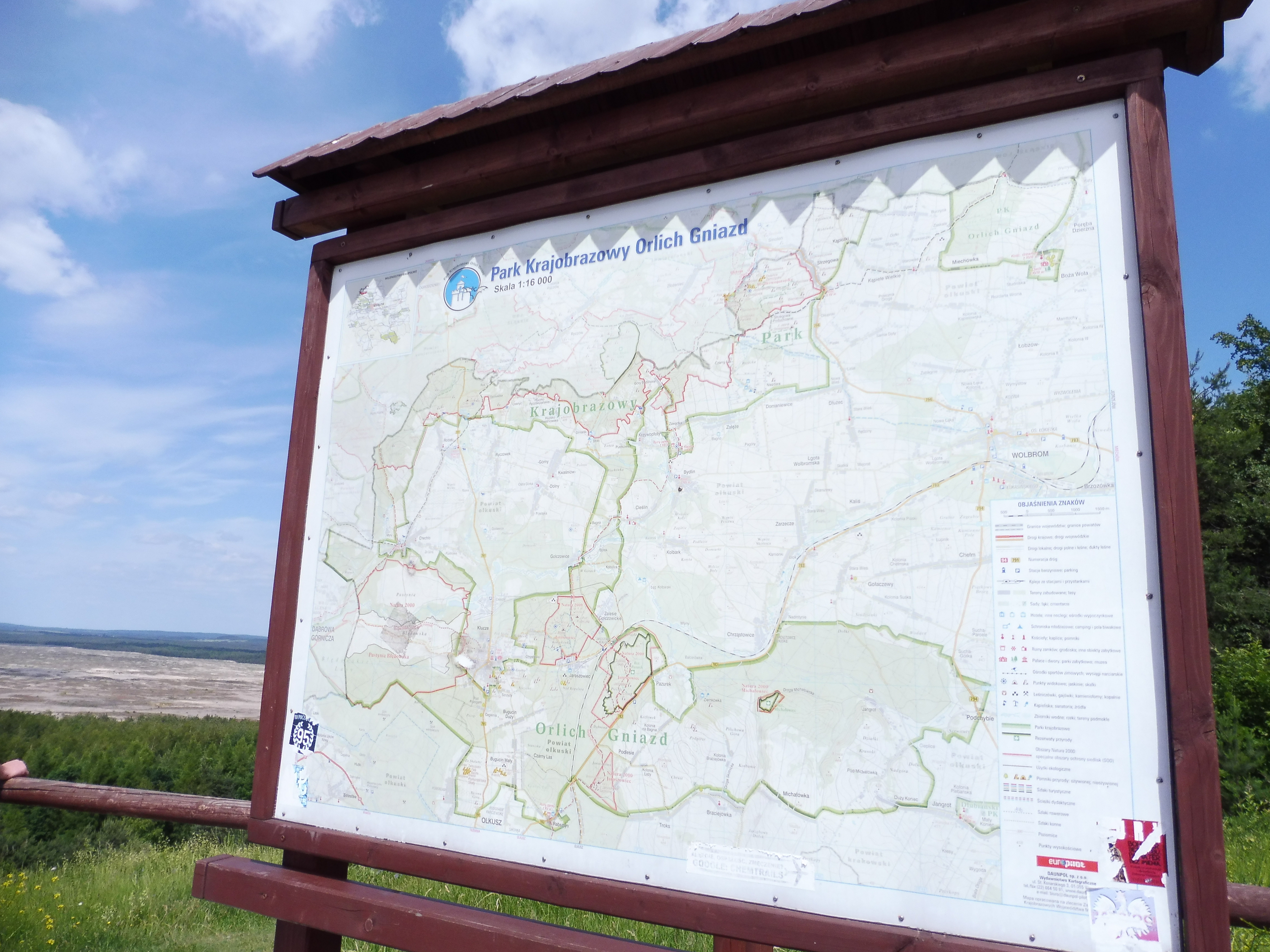
Tourist map on Czubatka hill

A hill in Klucze, acting as a viewpoint for the desert. Has several benches and tables for tourist activities and an observation tower acting as a fire lookout.

==== Dąbrówka Hill (355 m a.s.l) ====
A viewpoint with a platform for desert observation situated near the village of Chechło. Next to the observation platform, a World War II bunker is located. The restricted area of the desert is visible from the site.

== See also ==
- Oleshky Sands
- Lieberoser Wüste
