= Kytsivka Desert =

Sandy area and former military range in Kharkiv Oblast, Ukraine

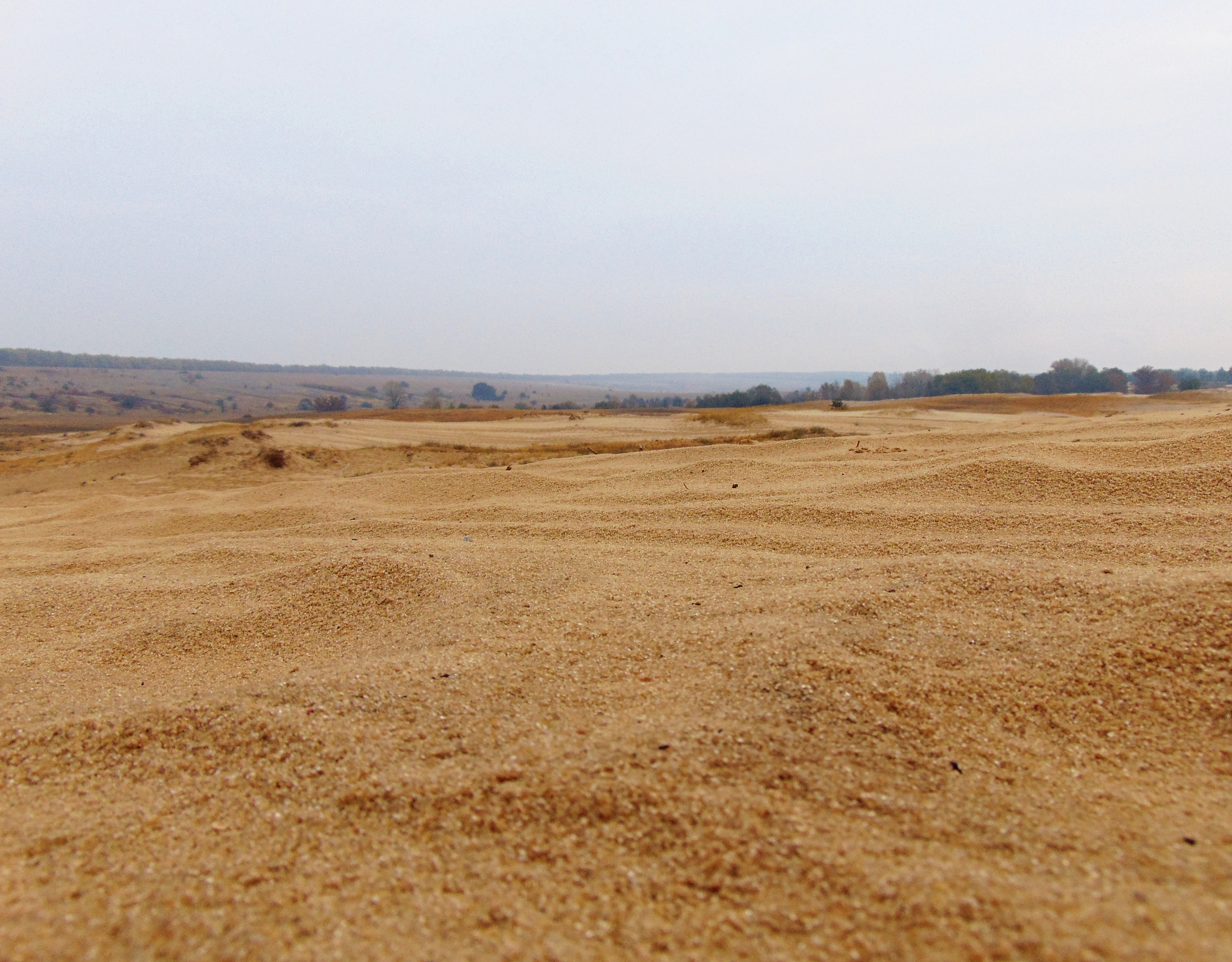
- Sand dunes of Kytsivka in Chuhuiv Raion
- Area: 5 km^{2} (1.9 mi^{2})

Geology
- Type: Aeolian sand massif

Geography
- Location: Near Kytsivka village
- Country: Ukraine
- State/Province: Kharkiv Oblast
- District: Chuhuiv Raion
- Coordinates: 49°50′46″N 36°49′12″E
- River: Siverskyi Donets
- Interactive map of Kytsivka Desert

Kytsivka Desert (Ukrainian: Кицівська пустеля), also known as the Hilly Sands, is a sandy area located in the Chuhuiv Raion of Kharkiv Oblast, Ukraine. It is a semi-desert ecosystem situated on the right-bank terraces of the Siverskyi Donets river valley.

== Geography and geology ==
The desert covers approximately 5 square kilometers. It was formed during the late Pleistocene epoch through the accumulation of alluvial sand deposits, which were subsequently shaped by Aeolian processes into dunes and ridges reaching heights of up to 15–20 meters.

== History ==
In the 20th century, from the 1960s until the early 1990s, the area was utilized as a tank testing and bombing range by the Soviet Armed Forces. The intense movement of heavy military vehicles prevented the natural afforestation of the area, maintaining the open sandy landscape.

== Flora and fauna ==
Despite its desert-like appearance, the area hosts diverse species:

Flora: Specialized psammophytic vegetation, including various species of thyme, festuca, and rare lichens.

Fauna: The desert is home to several rare insects and reptiles, including the sand lizard (Lacerta agilis) and species listed in the Red Data Book of Ukraine.

== Current status ==
Since the beginning of the Russian invasion of Ukraine, the area has been subject to ecological damage and remains dangerous due to potential unexploded ordnance from both historical military training and recent hostilities.

== Gallery ==
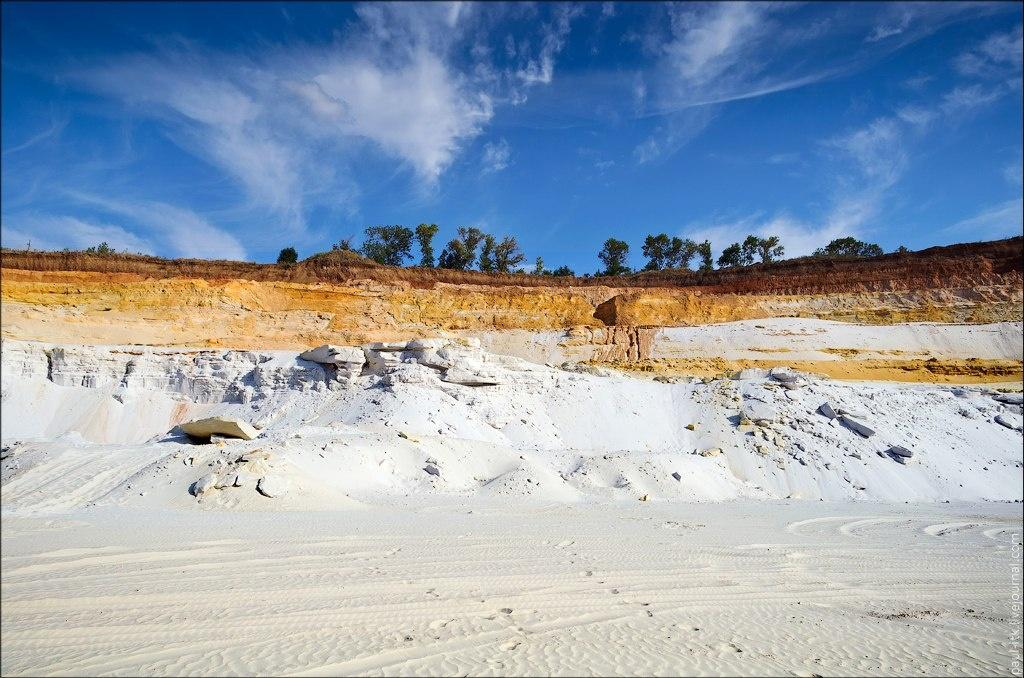

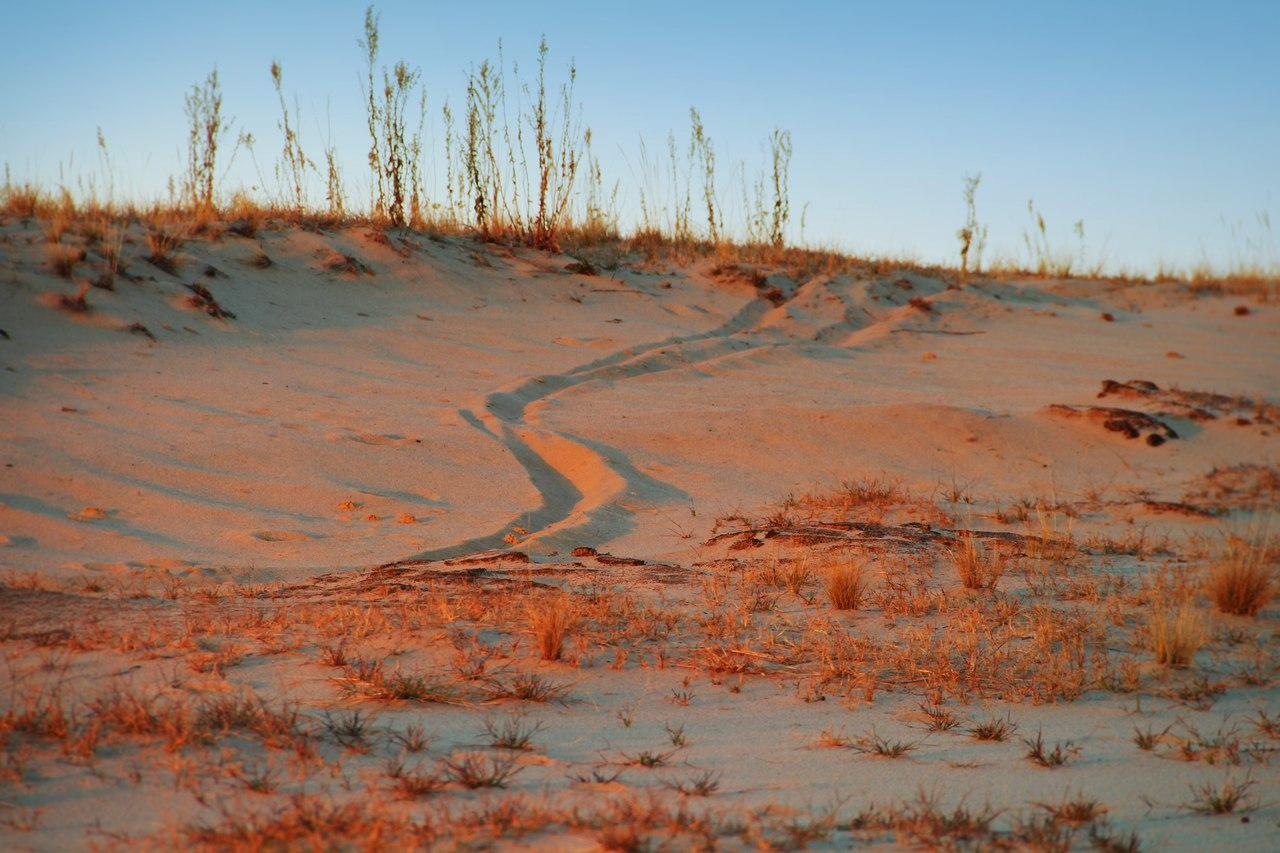

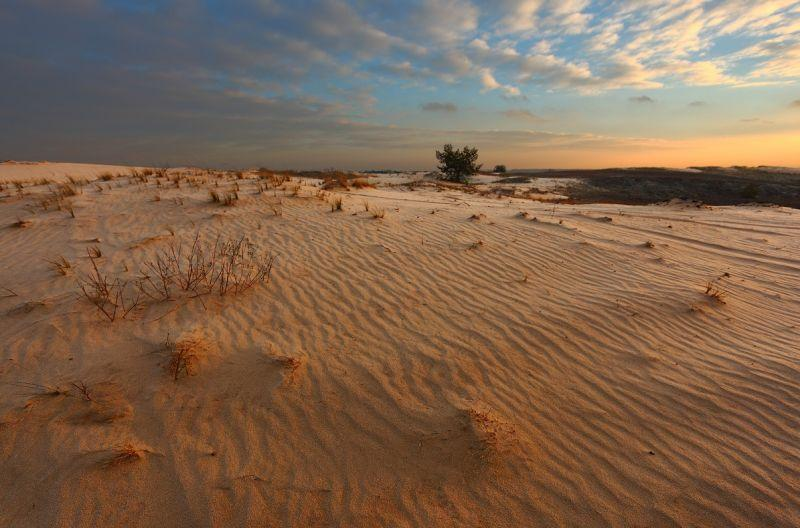

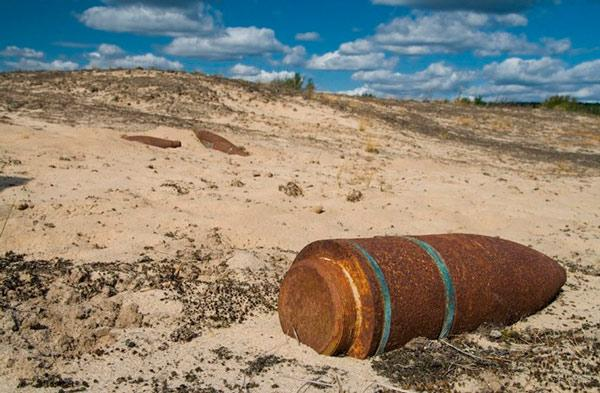

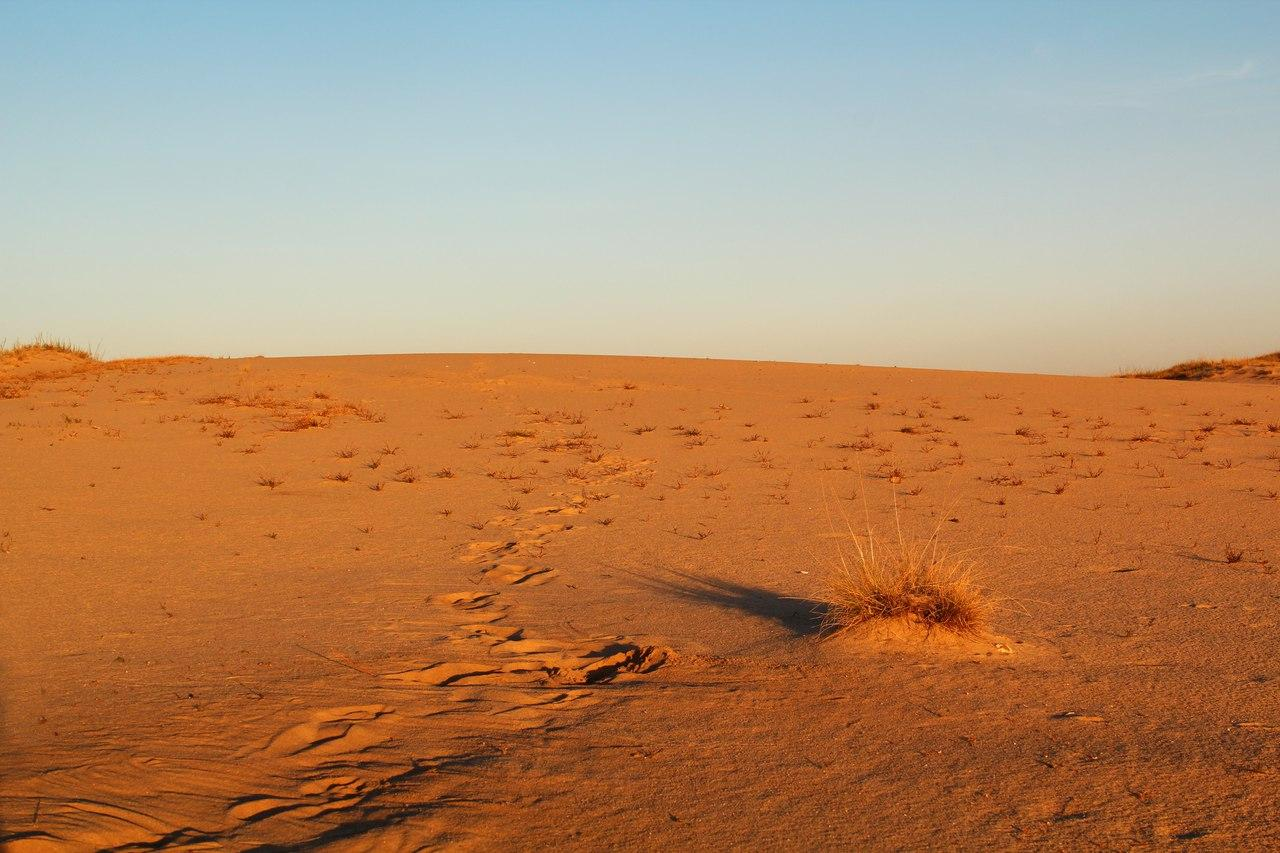

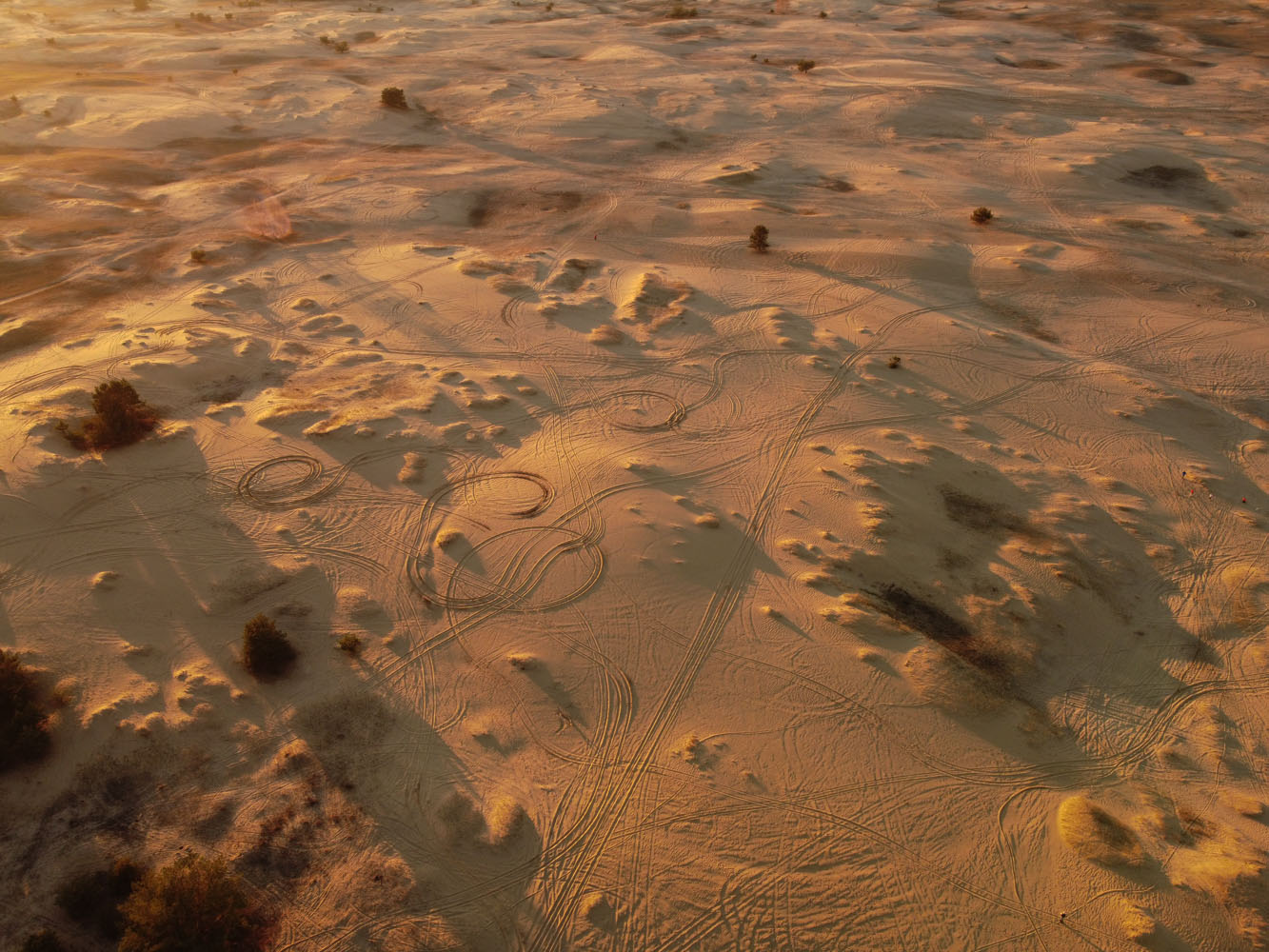

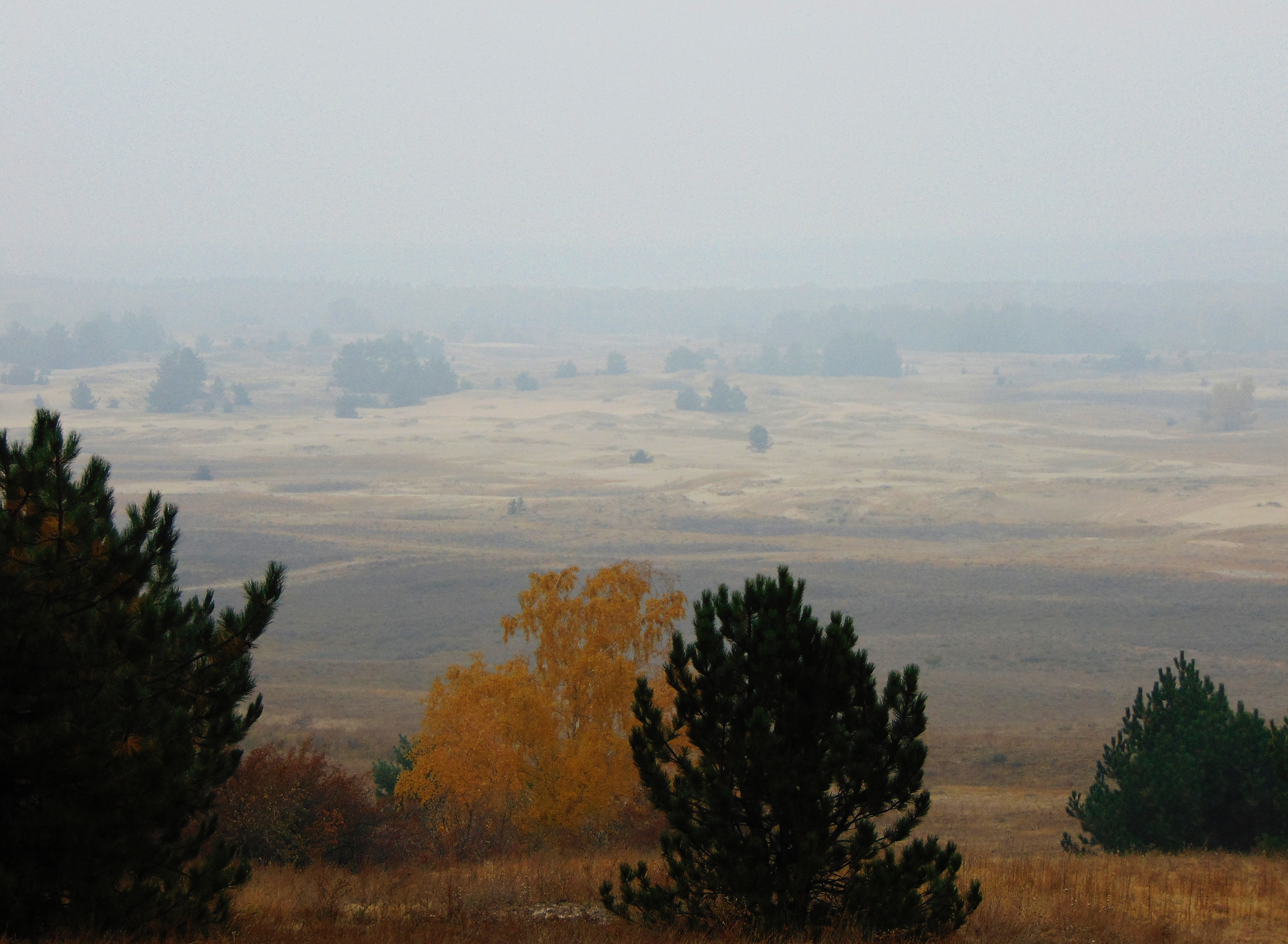

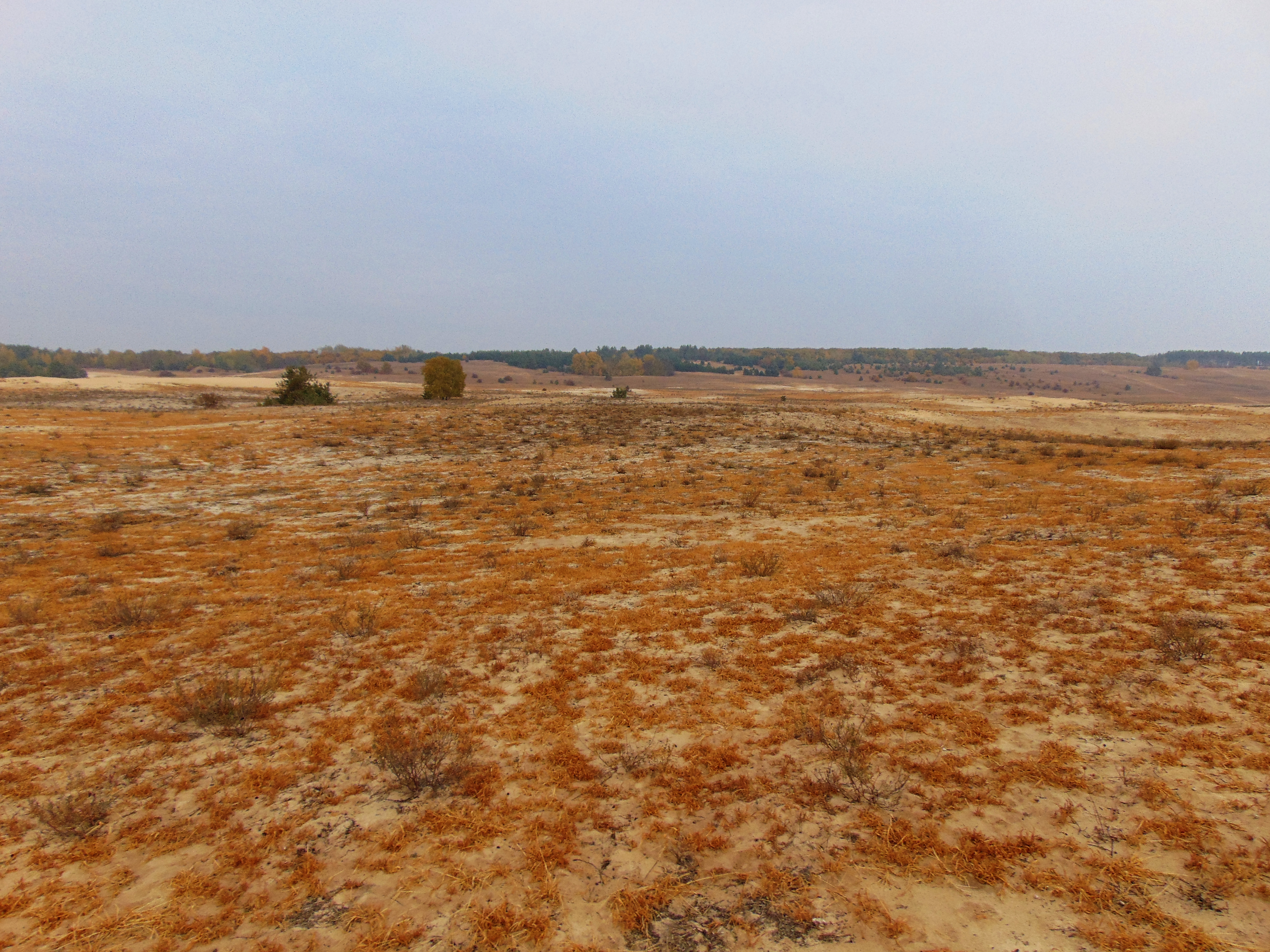

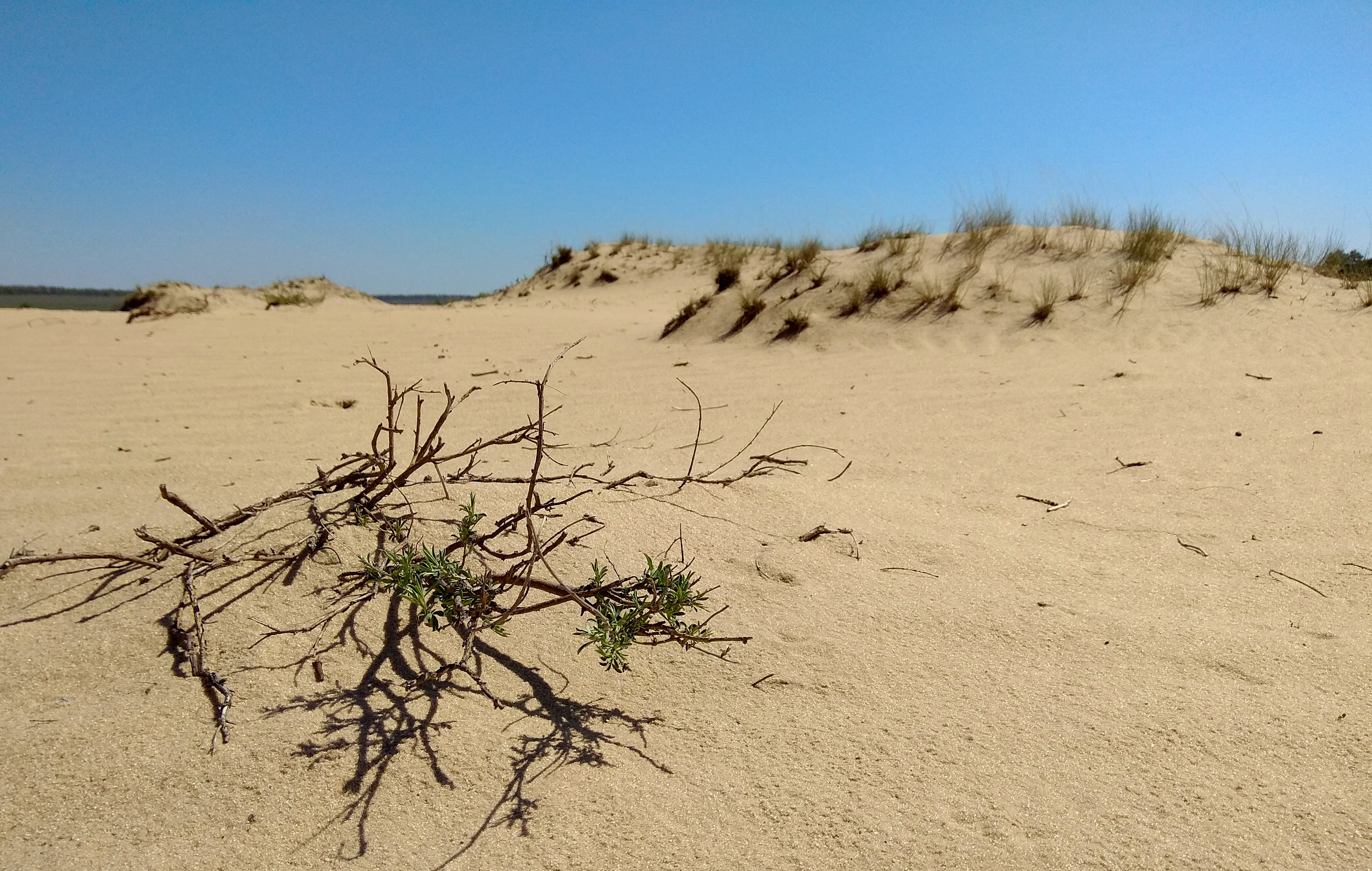

== See also ==
- Oleshky Sands
- Siverskyi Donets
- Geography of Ukraine
