= Bydlin Castle =

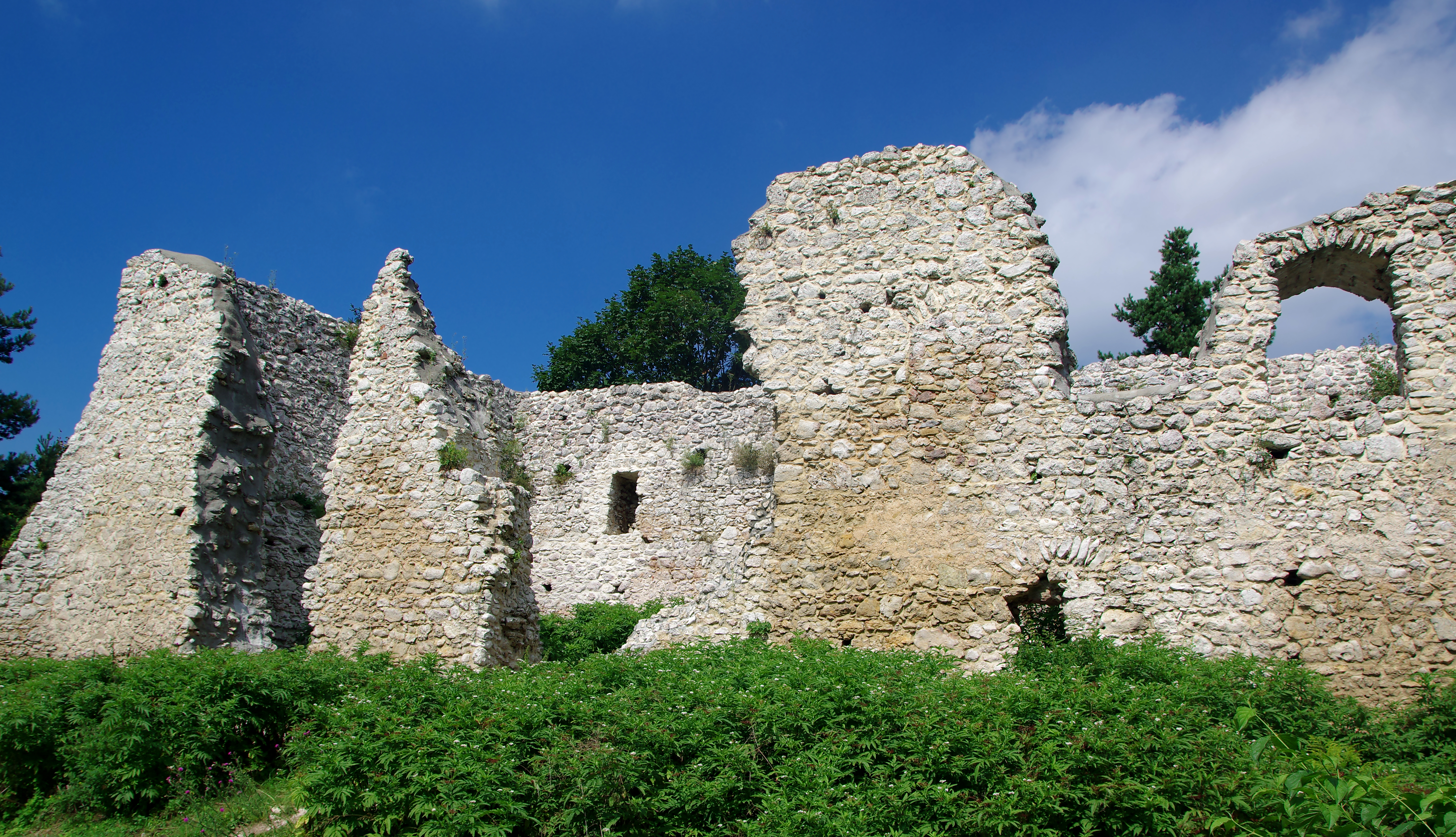
- Bydlin Castle

- Location of the Bydlin Castle in Poland
- 50°23′19″N 19°38′34″E
- Location: Bydlin, Lesser Poland Voivodeship, in Poland

History
- Built: 14th century

Site notes
- Architectural style: Gothic

Bydlin Castle is a fourteenth-century castle ruins, located in the Kraków-Częstochowa Upland. The fortress was built as part of the Trail of the Eagles' Nests defence system, located in the village of Bydlin, Lesser Poland Voivodeship in Poland.

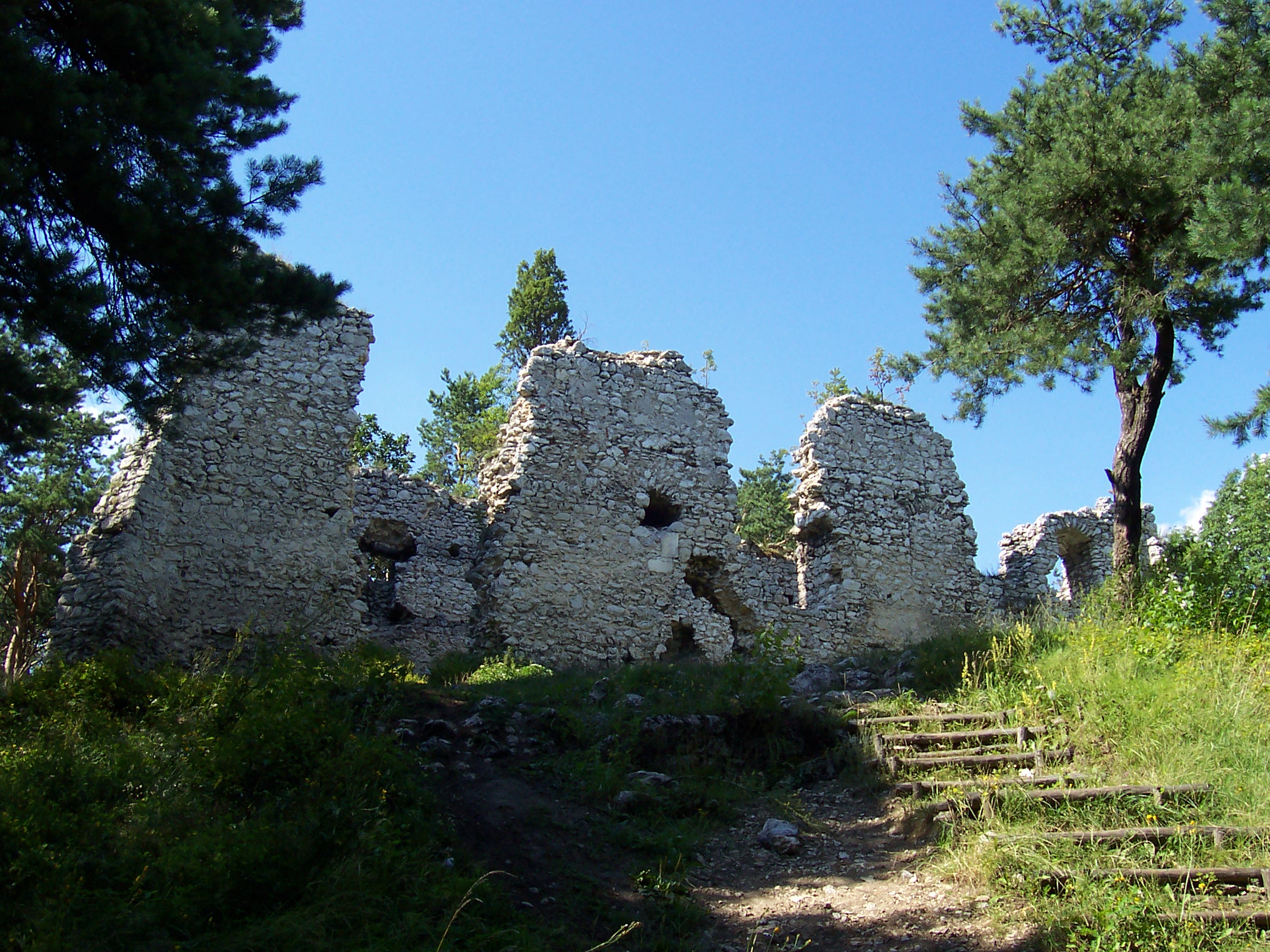
Bydlin Castle ruins before renovation works conducted in 2012
