= Golczowice =

Golczowice may refer to the following places:

- Golczowice, Lesser Poland Voivodeship (south Poland)
- Golczowice, Brzeg County in Opole Voivodeship (south-west Poland)
- Golczowice, Prudnik County in Opole Voivodeship (south-west Poland)
