= Battle of Krzywopłoty =

Battle of Krzywoploty
- Part of the Eastern Front during World War I
Date	17–18 November 1914
Location	Near the village of Krzywoploty, Congress Poland, Russian Empire (present-day Poland)
Result	Austro-Hungarian victory

Belligerents
Austria-Hungary	Russian Empire

Commanders and leaders
(Austria-Hungary) Mieczyslaw Rys-Trojanowski (Austria-Hungary) Ottokar Brzoza-Brzezina	Unknown

Units involved
(Austria-Hungary) 1st Regiment of Polish Legions	Unknown

Strength
440 soldiers: 2 battalions	Unknown

Casualties and losses
177 casualties: 46 killed 131 wounded or captured	Unknown

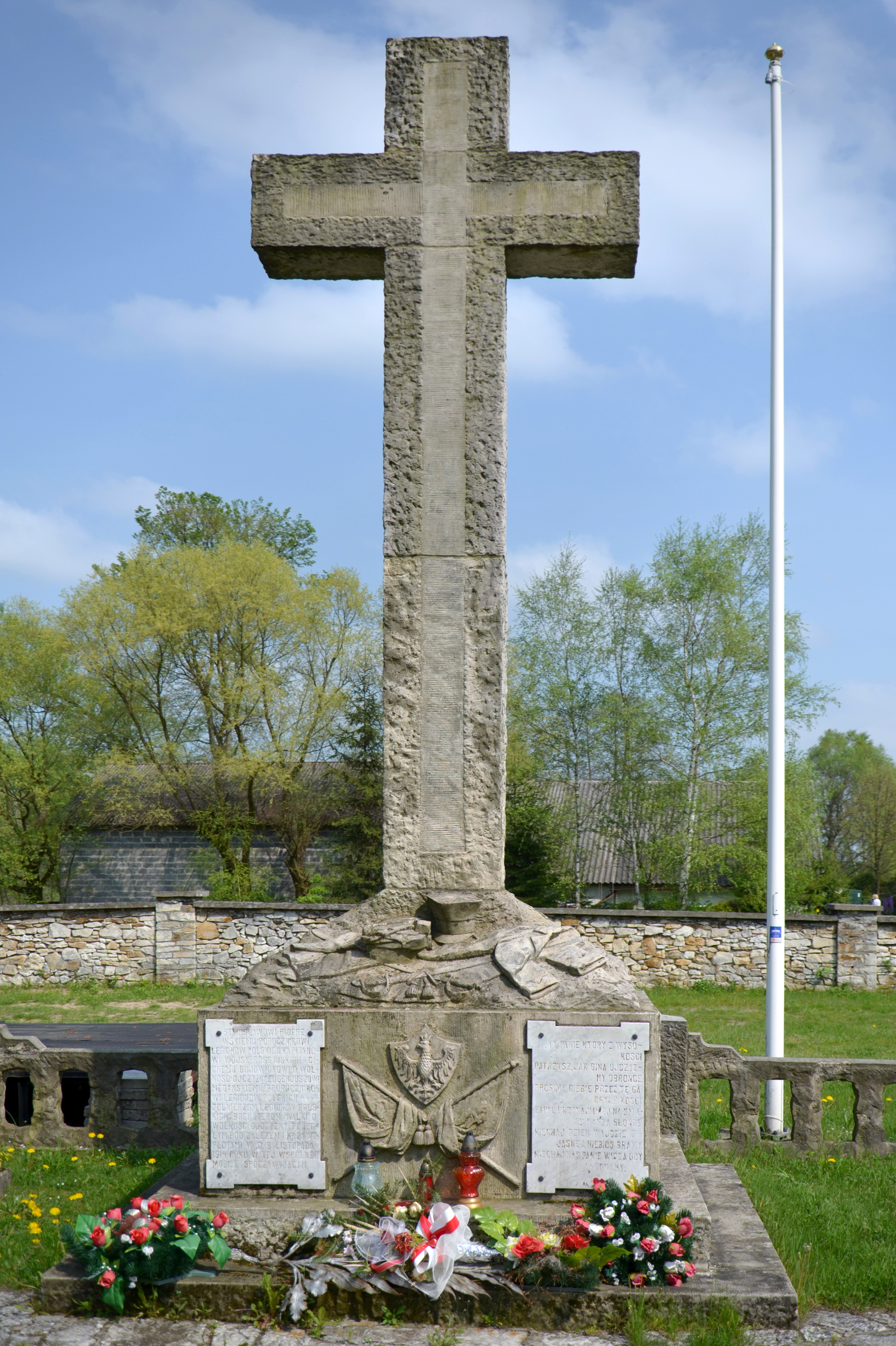
Memorial to the soldiers who died in the Battle of Krzywopłoty.

The Battle of Krzywoploty took place on November 17 – 18, 1914, near the village of Krzywoploty, which at that time belonged to Russian-controlled Congress Poland, and was located near the border with Austrian Galicia. Two battalions (440 soldiers) of 1st Regiment of Polish Legions in World War I (part of Austro-Hungarian Army) clashed with the Imperial Russian Army, in an attempt to stop a Russian offensive. Polish battalions were commanded by Captain Mieczyslaw Rys-Trojanowski and Captain Ottokar Brzoza-Brzezina.

On November 17, 4th and 6th Battalions, supported by field artillery, took positions on the hill of Holy Cross, located between Krzywoploty and Bydlin. Russians were located in forests by Domaniewice. The battle, which lasted for two days, was a success for the Legions, as they managed to halt a local Russian offensive. Polish losses were heavy, with 46 killed and 131 either wounded or captured. All victims, Polish, Austrian and Russian, were buried in a cemetery at Bydlin.

Jozef Pilsudski called the battle “our Thermopylae”, and following his initiative, a monument in the shape of a stone cross was unveiled at the Bydlin Cemetery in 1920. To commemorate the battle, soldiers of the Legions founded in 1937 a school in Bydlin.

The Battle of Krzywoploty is commemorated on the Tomb of the Unknown Soldier, Warsaw, with the inscription "KRZYWOPLOTY 14 XI 1914".

== Sources ==
- Mieczysław Wrzosek, Polski czyn zbrojny podczas pierwszej wojny światowej 1914-1918, Państwowe Wydawnictwo "Wiedza Powszechna", Warszawa 1990
