= Jaroszowiec =

- Village
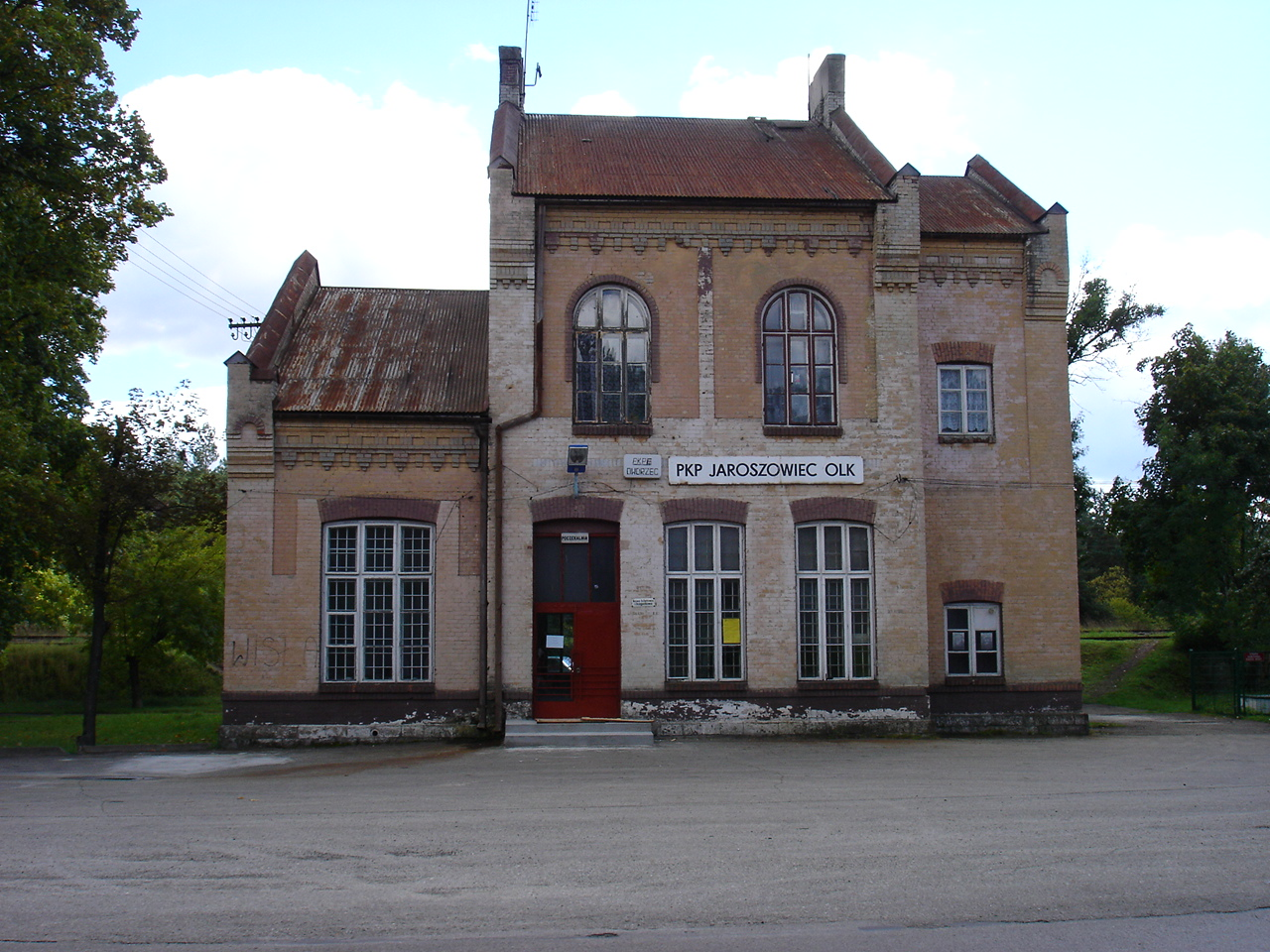
- Railway station

- Location within Poland
- Coordinates: 50°20′N 19°36′E
- Country: Poland
- Voivodeship: Lesser Poland
- County: Olkusz
- Gmina: Klucze
- Population: 1,700

Jaroszowiec [jarɔˈʂɔvjɛt͡s] is a village in the administrative district of Gmina Klucze, within Olkusz County, Lesser Poland Voivodeship, in southern Poland.
