= Gmina Klucze =

Gmina Klucze Klucze Commune
- Gmina
- Flag Coat of arms
- Interactive map of Gmina Klucze
- Coordinates (Klucze): 50°20′26″N 19°33′46″E
- Country: Poland
- Voivodeship: Lesser Poland
- County: Olkusz
- Seat: Klucze

Area
  - Total: 119.3 km^{2} (46.1 sq mi)

Population (2006)
  - Total: 14,895
  - Density: 124.9/km^{2} (323.4/sq mi)
- Website: http://www.gmina-klucze.pl

Gmina Klucze is a rural gmina (administrative district) in Olkusz County, Lesser Poland Voivodeship, in southern Poland. Its seat is the village of Klucze, which lies approximately 7 kilometres (4 mi) north of Olkusz and 41 km (25 mi) north-west of the regional capital Kraków.

The gmina covers an area of 119.3 square kilometres (46.1 sq mi), and as of 2006 its total population is 14,895.

== Villages ==
Gmina Klucze contains the villages and settlements of Bogucin Duży, Bydlin, Chechło, Cieślin, Golczowice, Hucisko Kwaśniowskie, Jaroszowiec, Klucze, Kolbark, Krzywopłoty, Kwaśniów Dolny, Kwaśniów Górny, Rodaki, Ryczówek and Zalesie Golczowskie.

== Neighbouring gminas ==
Gmina Klucze is bordered by the gminas of Bolesław, Łazy, Ogrodzieniec, Olkusz, Pilica and Wolbrom.
