= Ottokar Brzoza-Brzezina =

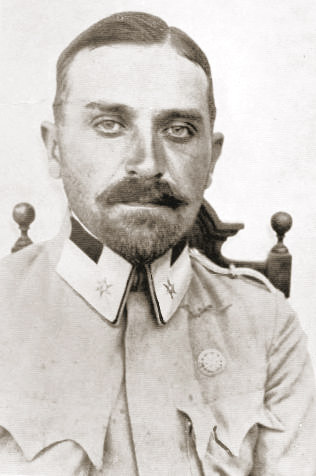
- Born: 3 March 1883; Protivín, Bohemia, Austria-Hungary
- Died: 30 August 1968 (aged 85); Zielonka, Poland
- Burial place: Powązki Military Cemetery, Warsaw, Poland
- Military career
- Allegiance: Austria-Hungary; Poland; Polish Underground State
- Branch: Austro-Hungarian Army; Polish Armed Forces; Home Army
- Service years: 1903–1927; 1939–1945
- Rank: Brigadier General
- Commands: 6th Infantry Division; Polish 50th Infantry Division „Brzoza”
- Conflicts: World War I: Battle of Krzywopłoty; Polish–Soviet War; World War II: Invasion of Poland

Ottokar Wincenty Brzoza-Brzezina (3 March 1883 – 30 August 1968) was a Polish brigadier general of Czech origin who was notable for his service in the Battle of Krzywopłoty during the First World War.

== Biography ==
Brzoza-Brzezina completed four classes of grammar school and then one year of the Higher Industrial School in Pilzno. He entered the Artillery Cadet School in Wiener Neustadt, which he graduated in August 1903, and was incorporated into the C. & K. 31st division artillery regiment in Stanisławów, which in 1908 was renamed the C. & K. 31 field gun regiments. In 1909 he was transferred to the reserve and assigned in reserve to the 31st field gun regiment.

In 1911 he joined the Union of Active Struggle, and then the Riflemen's Association, where he was the commander of the city of Stanisławów. After the outbreak of World War I and from August 1914 he served in the Polish Legions. He participated, inter alia, in the Battle of Krzywopłoty, where he became famous for the effective fire of the only artillery battery he commanded. Until March 1917, he was the organizer and commander of the 1st Artillery Regiment, and until July 1917 he was the battery and squadron commander in the 1st and 2nd field cannons regiment. After the Oath Crisis, he was incorporated into the Austrian army and became the commander of the backup battery in the 1st and 2nd Mountain Artillery Regiment. He was the protagonist of the poem by Jan Lechoń, Artillery Polonaise from the volume The Crimson Poem with the well-known stanza To Major Brzoza, with kartacz wels in Moscow regiments. Until 1918, its parent unit in the first and next to the Army was the 31st field cannon regiment, renamed successively into the 30th field cannon regiment and the 30th field artillery regiment.

In November 1918, he joined the reborn Polish Armed Forces. Until December 1918, he was the commander of the Podhale Military District in Nowy Targ and temporarily the head and commander of the General District of Kraków. In April 1919 he became the commander of the 1st field artillery regiment of the Legions. From April to June 1920, he was the head of the ammunition section in the Artillery Department of the Ministry of Military Affairs, after which he became an artillery inspector of the Reserve Army (Poland). In June 1920, he took command of the 6th Infantry Division, with which he fought briefly in the Polish-Soviet War. In August 1920, he became the deputy commander of the defense artillery of Warsaw. In the period from January to June 1921 he was an artillery inspection officer at the Chief of the General Staff. Until September 1922, he was a staff officer in the Command of the Corps District No. I in Warsaw. On 5 September 1922, he was transferred from the Reserve Officers of the Staff Officers of DOK I to the Command of the Corps District No. VIII in Toruń to the position of the chief of the Artillery and Armament Service. He served in this position until November 1925, and then was at the disposal of the commander of the Corps District No. VIII in Toruń. On 31 August 1927, he was retired . He lived in Zielonka near Warsaw, where he received land and a farm titled "Brzoza" for his merits.

On 1 September 1939, he volunteered for military service. On 22 September, he took command of the improvised group "Brzoza", which he organized from various backup units in the Małoryta region. On 25 or 26 September, along with his group, he surrendered to the commander of the Independent Operational Group Polesie, along with General Franciszek Kleeberg. On 28 September, after the "Drohiczyn Poleski" group was included in its composition, the whole was formally named the Polish 50th Infantry Division „Brzoza”. He commanded this division during the Battle of Kock. After the capitulation of SGP "Polesie", Brzoza-Brzezina was taken prisoner by the Germans but he was soon released due to his Czech origin. In mid-October he returned to Zielonka.

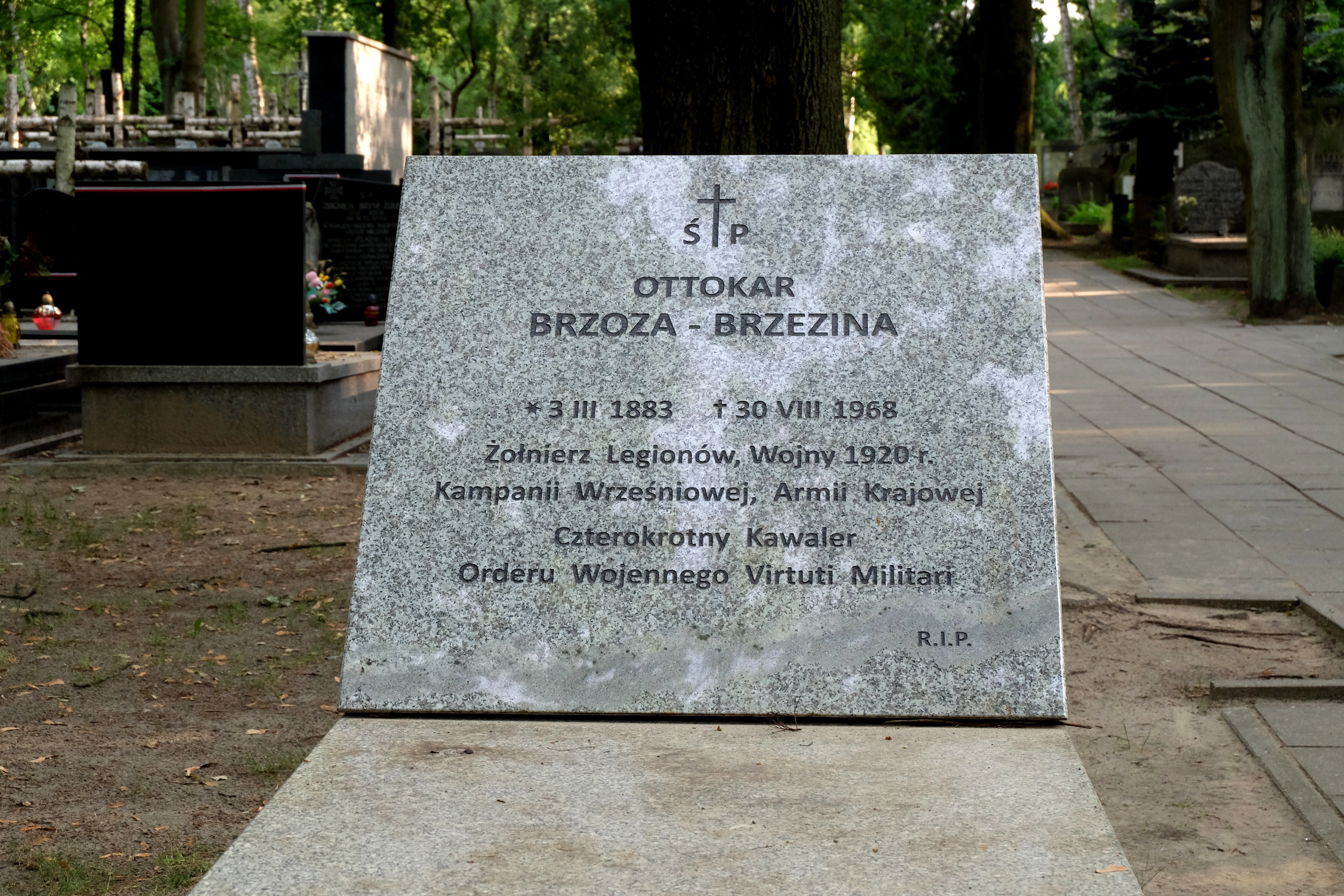
The grave of General Ottokar Brzoza-Brzezina at the Powązki Military Cemetery in Warsaw.

During the German occupation, he ran a construction company. From November 1939, he made contact with the Headquarters of the Polish Armed Forces. His property played the role of an underground center of the Warsaw District of the SZP, and then of the ZWZ and finally served the Home Army. In 1943, his property became a training base for non-commissioned officers of the "Dęby" Home Army territorial battalion was established there. Ottokar Brzoza-Brzezina actively cooperated with the Home Army intelligence service. He also hid a group of Jews in his farm. In 1944 he was arrested by the Germans and taken to Oflag II-C.

After being released from captivity, he returned to Poland. He moved to Zielonka again, where he died. He was buried at the Bródno Cemetery in Warsaw (section 110-O-IV-13). His name was given to a street in Zielonka, on the so-called Bank. On 5 May 2018, his remains were transferred with military honors to the Powązki Military Cemetery in Warsaw (section 18A-3-30).

== Promotions ==
- Cadet-deputy officer – 1 September 1903
- Second lieutenant – 1 November 1905
- Lieutenant – with seniority on 1 May 1911
- Captain – 1914 (in the middle and near the army, the captain of the reserve with seniority from 1 September 1915)
- Major – 1915
- Lieutenant colonel – 1918
- Colonel – 1920
- Brigadier General – 1969 (posthumously, appointed on 15 February by the President of the Republic of Poland-in-Exile August Zaleski)

== Awards ==
- Virtuti Militari, Knights Cross (1970, posthumously)
- Virtuti Militari, Gold Cross (Award no. 199 for World War II)
- Virtuti Militari, Silver Cross (No. 13976 for World War II and No. 7502 – for the Polish–Soviet War)
- Cross of Valour (Awarded Four times, first cross awarded in 1921)
- Officer's Badge of Riflemen's Associations

=== Foreign Awards ===
- Germany: Iron Cross, II Class
