= Cieślin, Lesser Poland Voivodeship =

Cieślin
- Village
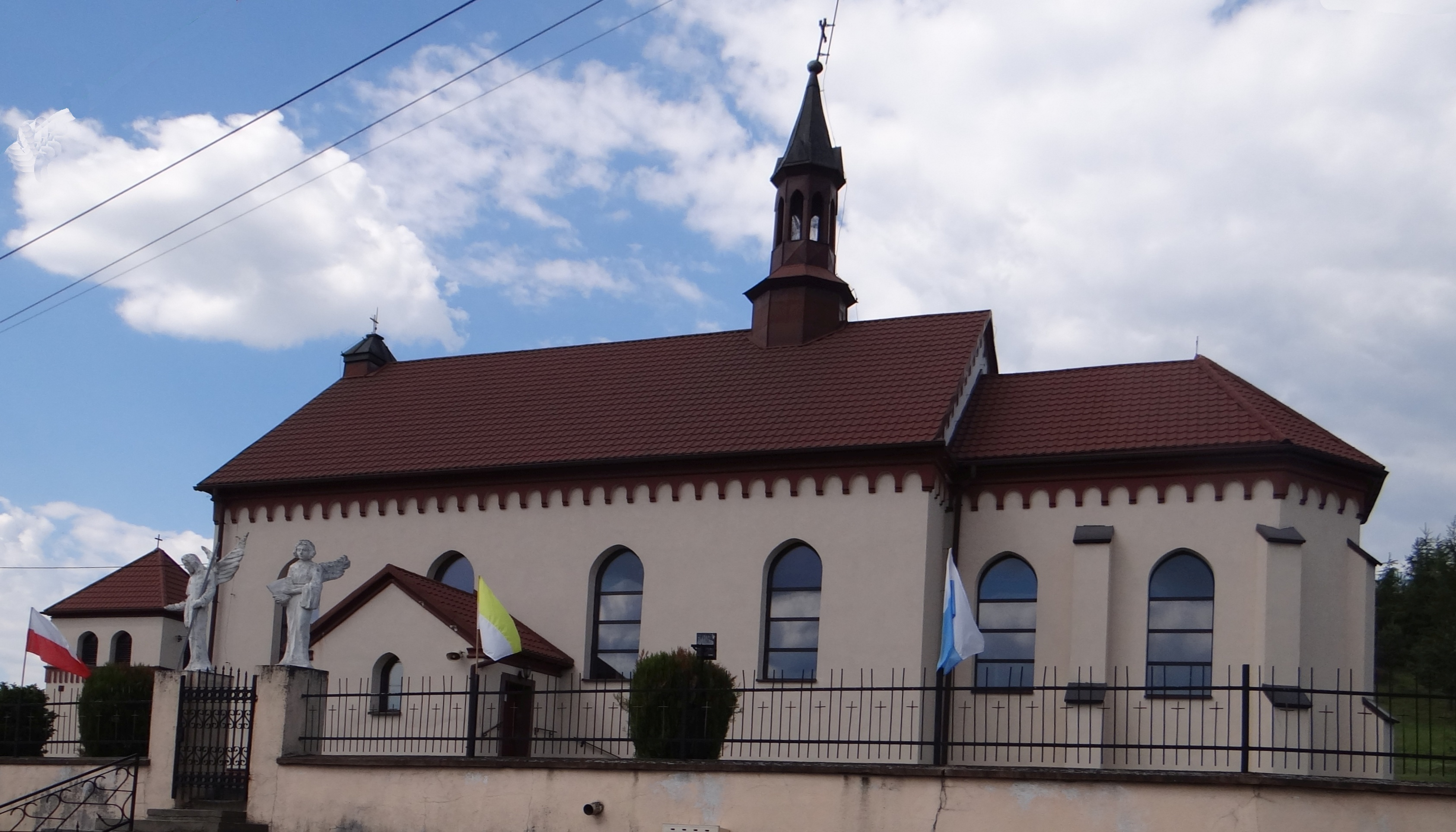
- Catholic church

- Location within Poland
- Coordinates: 50°23′N 19°38′E
- Country: Poland
- Voivodeship: Lesser Poland
- County: Olkusz
- Gmina: Klucze

Cieślin [ˈt͡ɕɛɕlin] is a village in the administrative district of Gmina Klucze, within Olkusz County, Lesser Poland Voivodeship, in southern Poland.
