= Kwaśniów Dolny =

- Village
- Location within Poland
- Coordinates: 50°23′N 19°35′E
- Country: Poland
- Voivodeship: Lesser Poland
- County: Olkusz
- Gmina: Klucze

Kwaśniów Dolny [ˈkfaɕɲuf ˈdɔlnɨ] is a village in the administrative district of Gmina Klucze, within Olkusz County, Lesser Poland Voivodeship, in southern Poland.
