= Hucisko Kwaśniowskie =

- Village
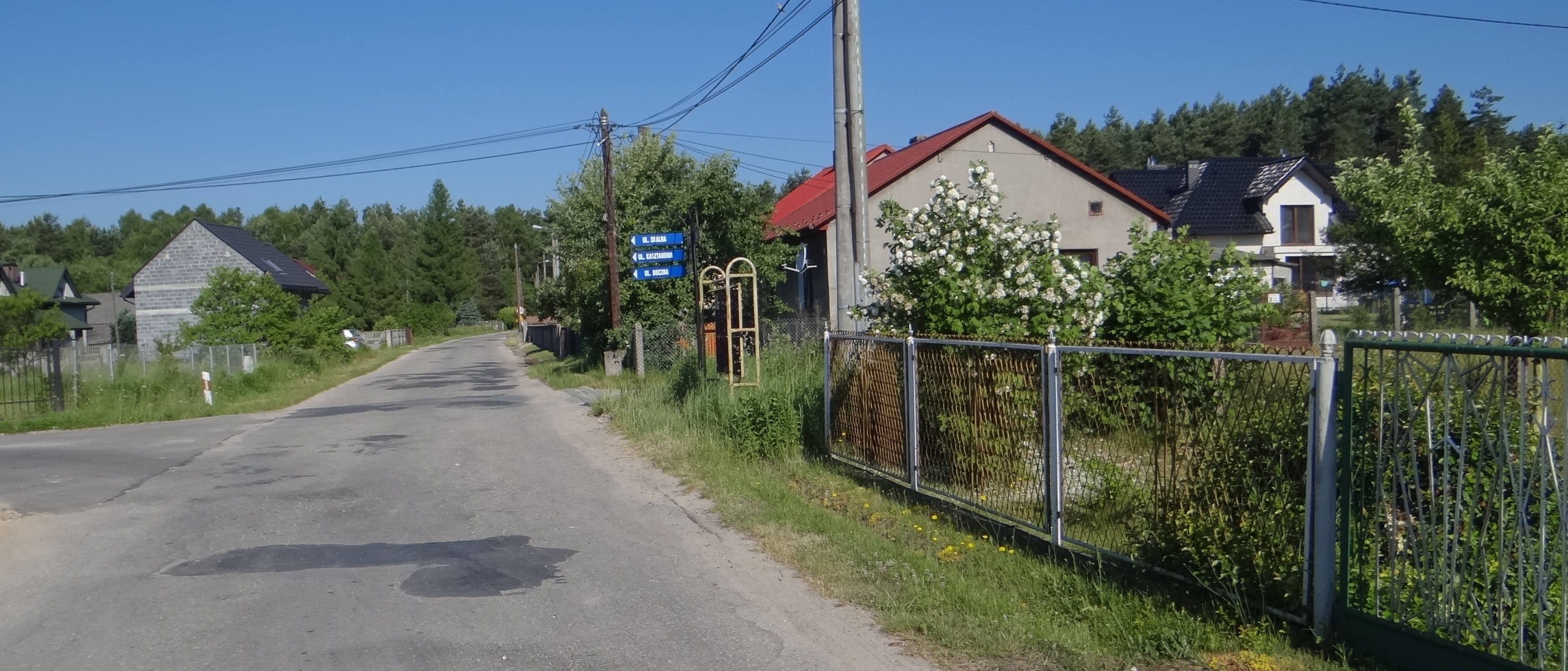

- Location within Poland
- Coordinates: 50°24′6″N 19°35′18″E
- Country: Poland
- Voivodeship: Lesser Poland
- County: Olkusz
- Gmina: Klucze

Hucisko Kwaśniowskie [xuˈt͡ɕiskɔ kfaɕˈɲɔfskʲɛ] is a village in the administrative district of Gmina Klucze, within Olkusz County, Lesser Poland Voivodeship, in southern Poland.
