= Rodaki =

- Village
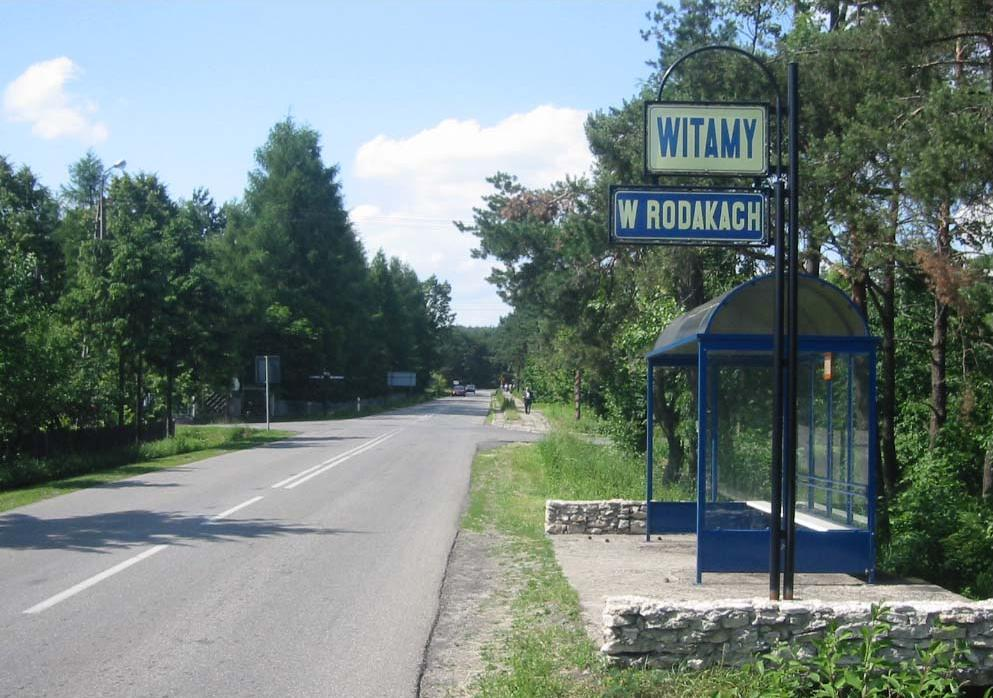

- Location within Poland
- Coordinates: 50°23′45.60″N 19°32′1.32″E
- Country: Poland
- Voivodeship: Lesser Poland
- County: Olkusz
- Gmina: Klucze
- Population: 948
- Website: http://www.rodaki.pl www.jurajskawioskarodaki.pl

Rodaki [rɔˈdaki] is a village in the administrative district of Gmina Klucze, within Olkusz County, Lesser Poland Voivodeship, in southern Poland.

The village has an approximate population of 948.
