= Zalesie Golczowskie =

- Village
- Location within Poland
- Coordinates: 50°20′57″N 19°36′58″E
- Country: Poland
- Voivodeship: Lesser Poland
- County: Olkusz
- Gmina: Klucze
- Population (approx.): 300

Zalesie Golczowskie [zaˈlɛɕɛ ɡɔlˈt͡ʂɔfskʲɛ] is a village in the administrative district of Gmina Klucze, within Olkusz County, Lesser Poland Voivodeship, in southern Poland.

The village has an approximate population of 300.
