= Ryczówek =

- Village
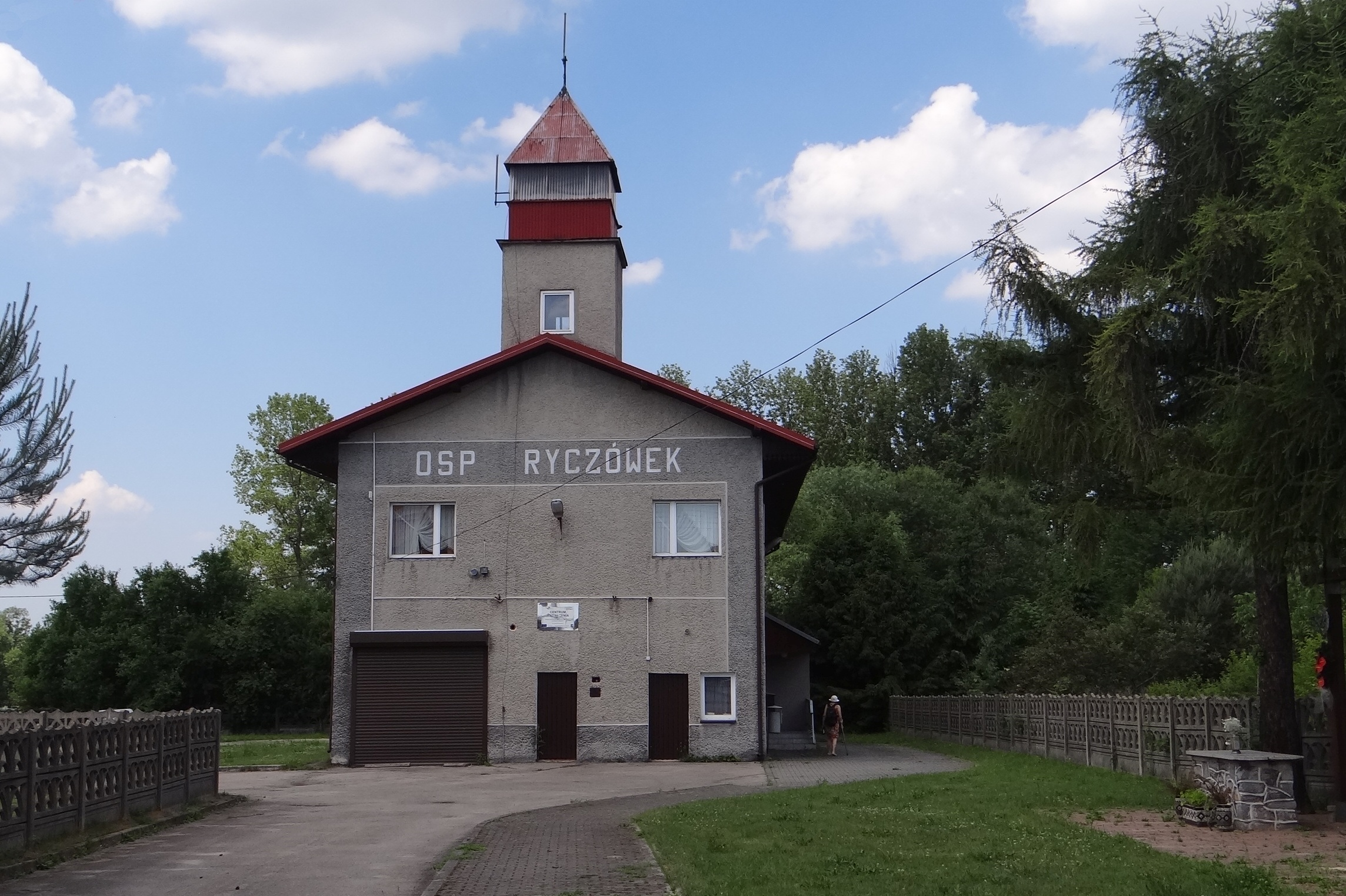
- Fire station

- Location within Poland
- Coordinates: 50°23′N 19°34′E
- Country: Poland
- Voivodeship: Lesser Poland
- County: Olkusz
- Gmina: Klucze

Ryczówek [rɨˈt͡ʂuvɛk] is a village in the administrative district of Gmina Klucze, within Olkusz County, Lesser Poland Voivodeship, in southern Poland.
