= Kwaśniów Górny =

- Village
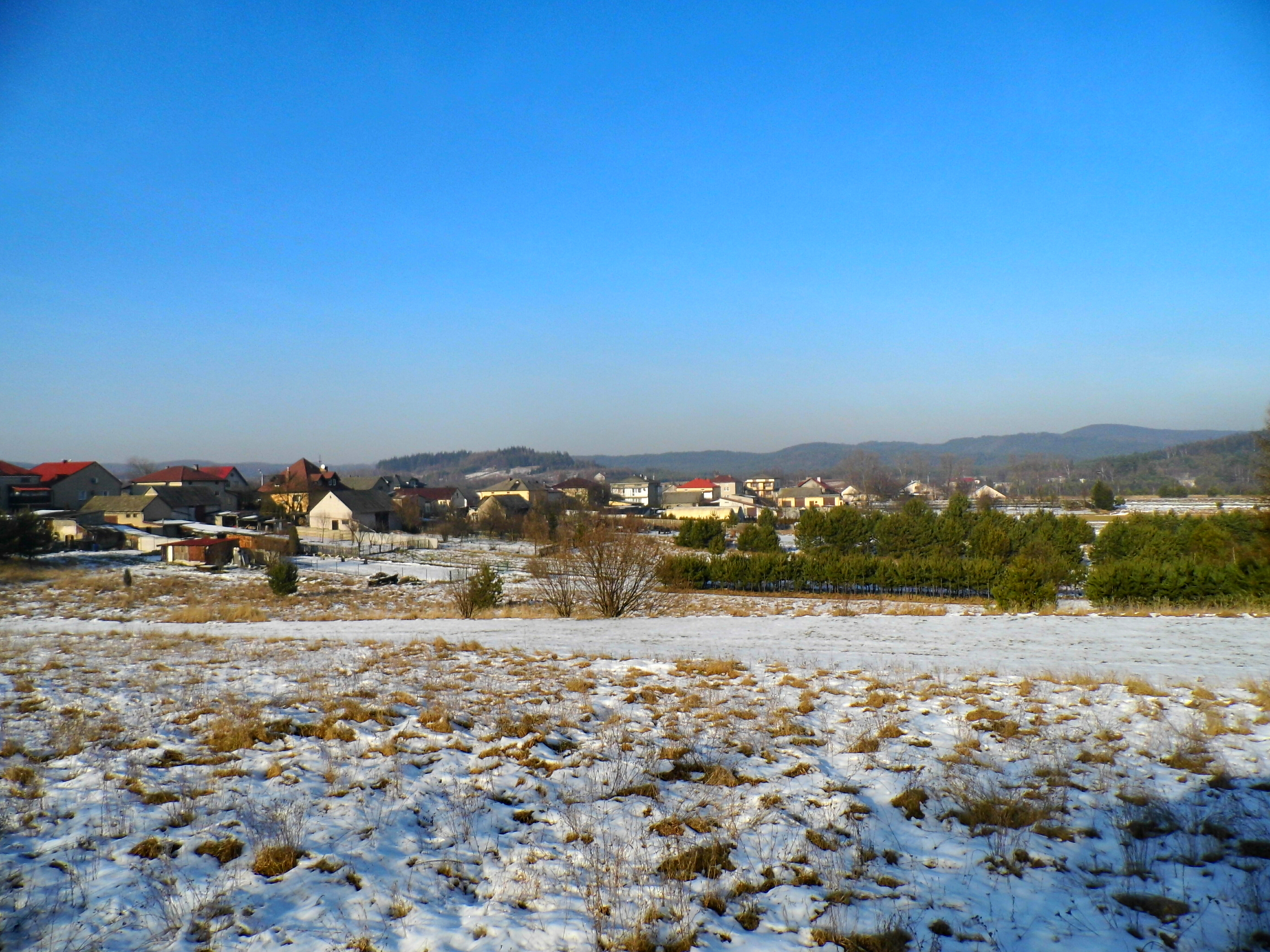

- Location within Poland
- Coordinates: 50°23′N 19°36′E
- Country: Poland
- Voivodeship: Lesser Poland
- County: Olkusz
- Gmina: Klucze
- Population: 704

Kwaśniów Górny [ˈkfaɕɲuf ˈɡurnɨ] is a village in the administrative district of Gmina Klucze, within Olkusz County, Lesser Poland Voivodeship, in southern Poland.
