= Klucze, Lesser Poland Voivodeship =

Klucze
- Village
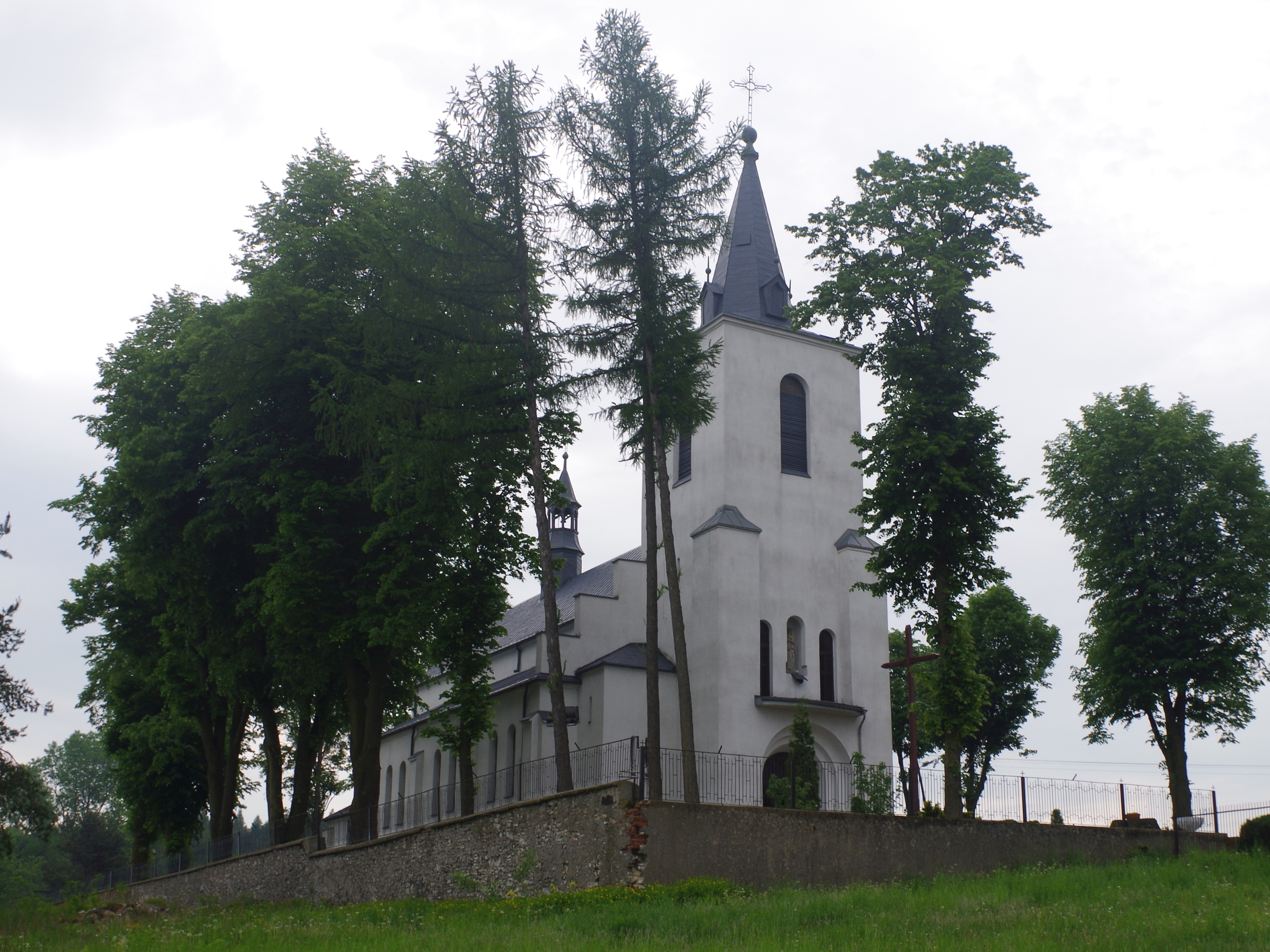
- Church of Our Lady of Perpetual Help

- Location within Poland
- Coordinates: 50°20′26″N 19°33′46″E
- Country: Poland
- Voivodeship: Lesser Poland
- County: Olkusz
- Gmina: Klucze
- Population: 5,926

Klucze[ˈklut͡ʂɛ] (Keys in Polish) is a village in Olkusz County, Lesser Poland Voivodeship, in southern Poland. It is the seat of the gmina (administrative district) called Gmina Klucze.
