= Chechło, Lesser Poland Voivodeship =

Chechło
- Village
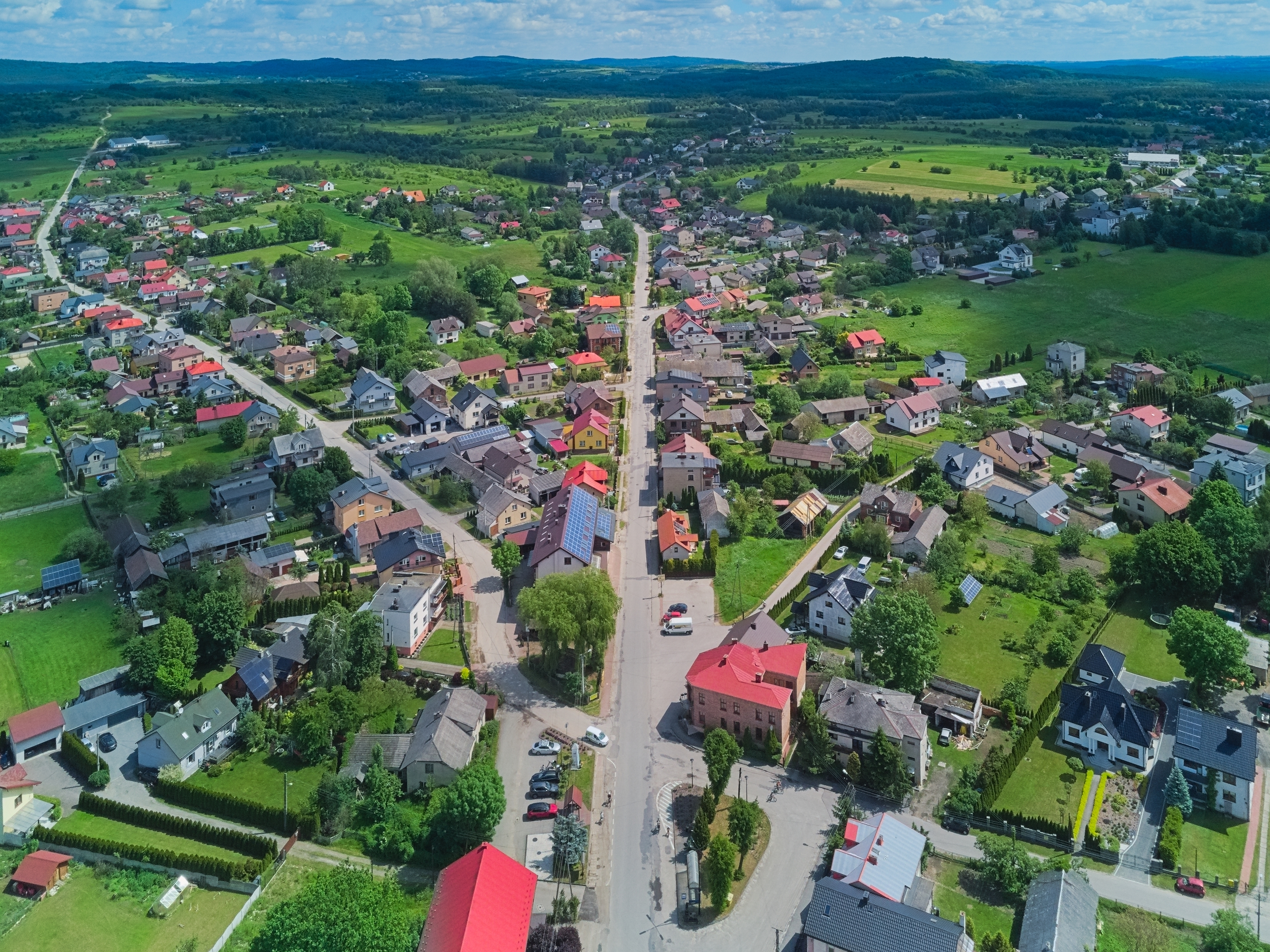
- Aerial view in 2026

- Location within Poland
- Coordinates: 50°22′48″N 19°30′58″E
- Country: Poland
- Voivodeship: Lesser Poland
- County: Olkusz
- Gmina: Klucze
- Population (approx.): 1,750
- Website: http://www.chechlo.com.pl

Chechło [ˈxɛxwɔ] is a village in the administrative district of Gmina Klucze, within Olkusz County, Lesser Poland Voivodeship, in southern Poland.

The village has an approximate population of 1,750.
