= Oleshky Sands =

Sand dunes in Kherson Oblast, Ukraine

- Олешківські піски / Алёшковские пески
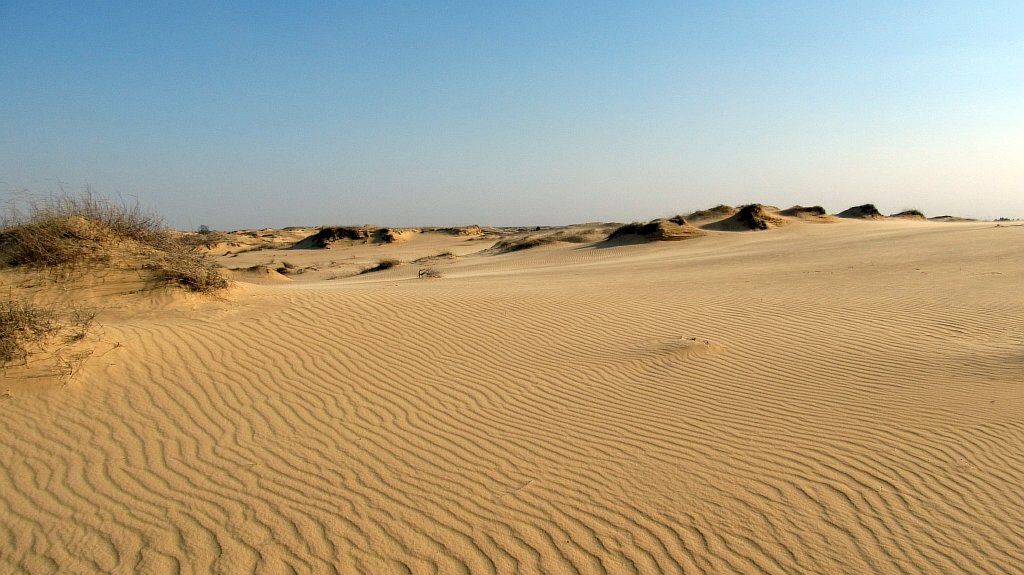
- Central part of Oleshky Sands in spring
- Area: 1,612 km^{2} (622 mi^{2})

Geology
- Type: Sand desert

Geography
- Country: Ukraine
- State: Ukraine
- Region: Kherson Oblast
- District: Kherson Raion
- Coordinates: 46.58°N 33.05°E
- River: Dnipro
- Interactive map of Oleshky Sands

Oleshky Sands is a semi-desert in Ukraine inland from the Black Sea. It consists of sand dunes, locally called kuchuhury (Ukrainian: кучугури), which are up to five meters high. Sparse vegetation can be located across the sands.

== Origin ==
The sands are thought to be formed during the most recent ice age by aeolian processes accumulating and forming cliffs of lower parts of nearby River Dnipro. It is speculated that the amount of vegetation was reduced by herds of sheep who were introduced there by Friedrich-Jacob Eduardovych Falz-Fein who used the sands, formerly populated by weeds, as a pasture. In modern times the area has become the Oleshky Sands National Nature Park.

== Geography ==
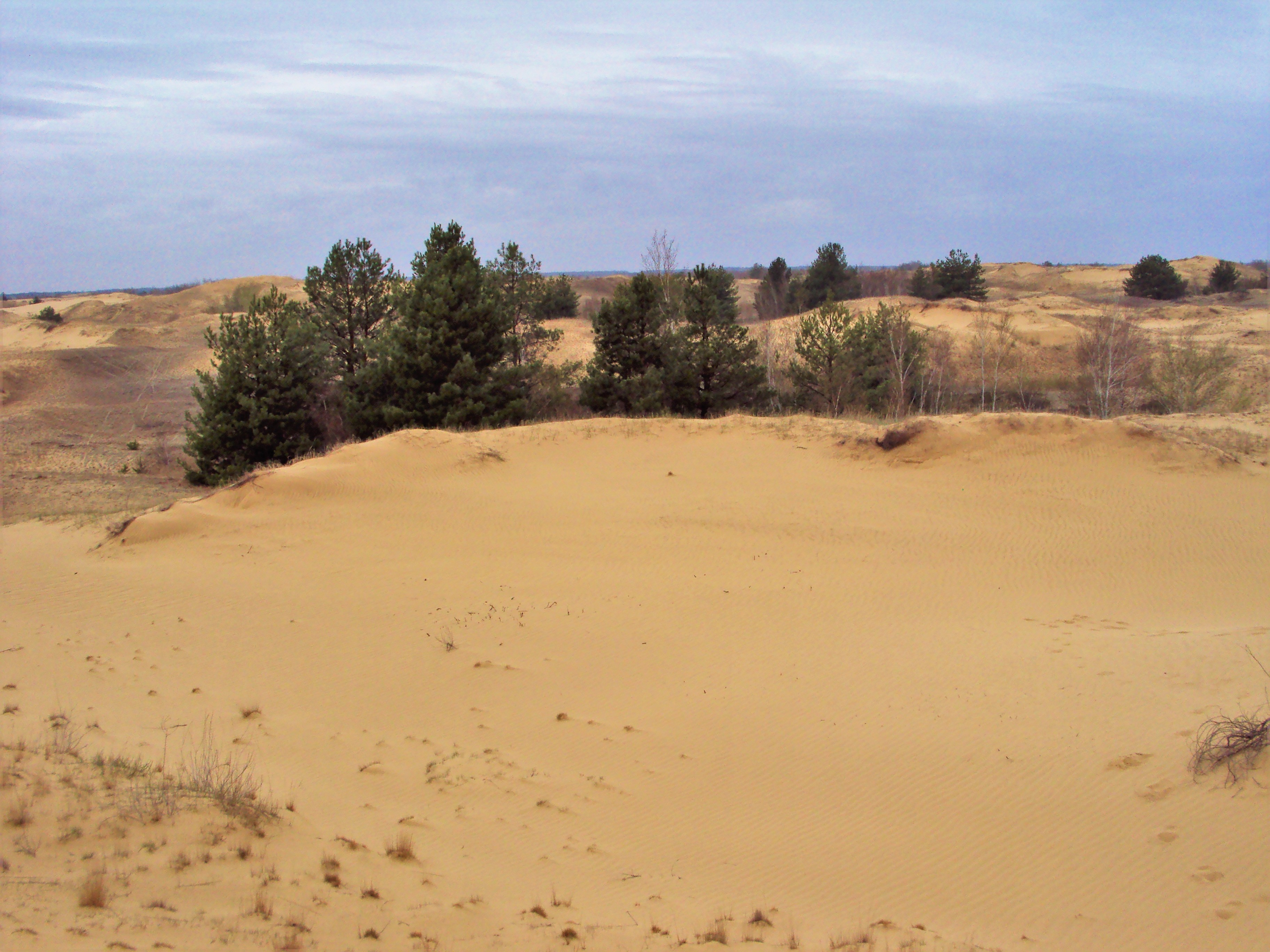
Pine forest is man-made here, but sometimes independent growth is also found.

The Oleshky Desert is located in Kherson Raion, Kherson Oblast, 30 km (~20 mi) east of Kherson. Before the Russian annexation of the Crimean Khanate at the end of the 18th century, the territory belonged to the nomad Nogai Hordes, particularly the Djambuilut Horde. No detailed historical information about the region has survived.

The closest populated settlement is seven kilometers away (~4.5 mi). In Soviet times the sands were used as an Air Force bombing range for pilots of the Warsaw Pact alliance. To this day there is a possibility of finding some unexploded ordnance.

== Environment ==
Due to its temperature and the amount of precipitation, the area is sometimes described as a semi-desert. Oleshky Sands are around 15 kilometres (9 mi) across and are surrounded by a dense afforestation, planted to prevent dunes moving. Due to its density, the forest often catches fire. Although a relatively small sandy steppe, the Oleshky Sands have sandstorms. They occur as the type of the sand is very fine and is easily picked up by a wind. The intensity of the sandstorms is rather weak.

== See also ==
- Askania-Nova
- Cumania
- Deliblato Sands
- Błędów Desert
- Lieberoser Wüste
