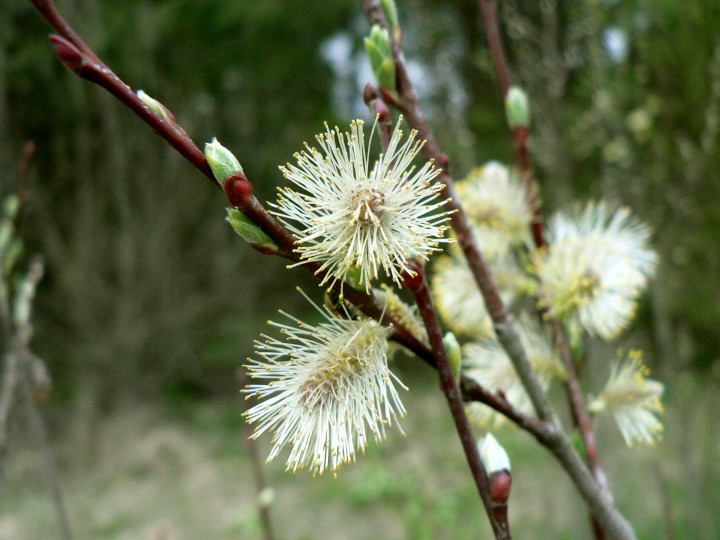

Conservation status
- Least Concern (IUCN 3.1)

Scientific classification
- Kingdom: Plantae
- Clade: Tracheophytes
- Clade: Angiosperms
- Clade: Eudicots
- Clade: Rosids
- Order: Malpighiales
- Family: Salicaceae
- Genus: Salix
- Species: S. acutifolia

Binomial name
- Salix acutifolia Willd.

= Salix acutifolia =

Species of flowering plant

Salix acutifolia, also known as Siberian violet-willow, long-leaved violet willow or sharp-leaf willow, is a species of flowering plant in the family Salicaceae, native to Russia and eastern Asia. It is a spreading, deciduous shrub or tree, growing to 10 m (33 ft) tall by 12 m (39 ft) wide. The young shoots are deep purple with a white bloom. The leaves are narrow, up to 10 cm (4 in) long. The catkins are produced in early spring, before the leaves. Older bark has a fine, netted pattern.

Like all willows this species is dioecious. Male catkins are 5 cm (2 in) and silvery, with gold anthers, while female catkins are green and 3 cm (1 in) long.

The specific epithet acutifolia means "sharp-leaved".

The male clone 'Blue Streak' has gained the Royal Horticultural Society's Award of Garden Merit.
