= Golczowice, Lesser Poland Voivodeship =

Golczowice
- Village
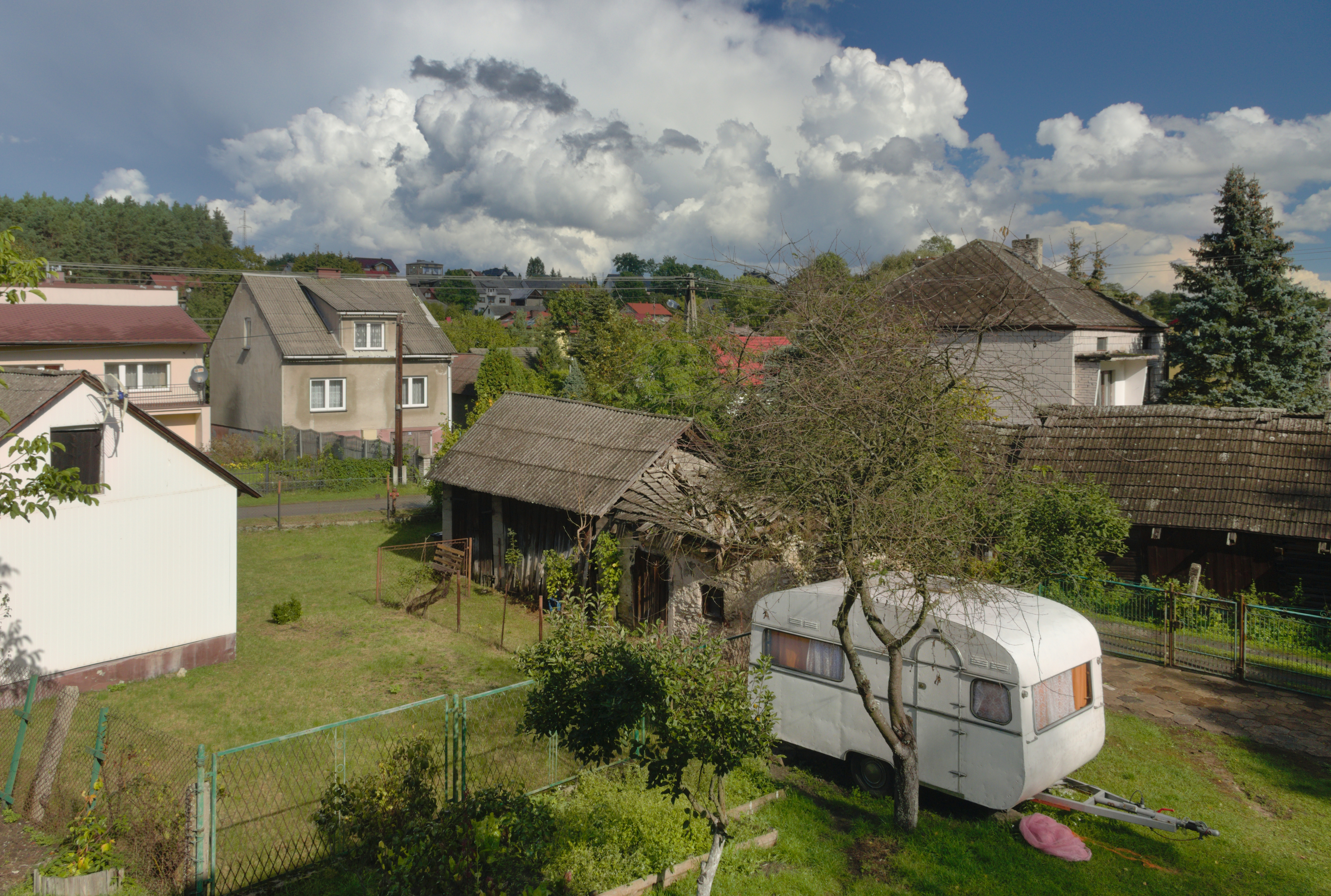
- Golczowice, view from Plażowa Street (2020)

- Location within Poland
- Coordinates: 50°22′N 19°36′E
- Country: Poland
- Voivodeship: Lesser Poland
- County: Olkusz
- Gmina: Klucze
- Population: 279

Golczowice [ɡɔlt͡ʂɔˈvit͡sɛ] is a village in the administrative district of Gmina Klucze, within Olkusz County, Lesser Poland Voivodeship, in southern Poland.
