= Krzywopłoty, Lesser Poland Voivodeship =

Krzywopłoty
- Village
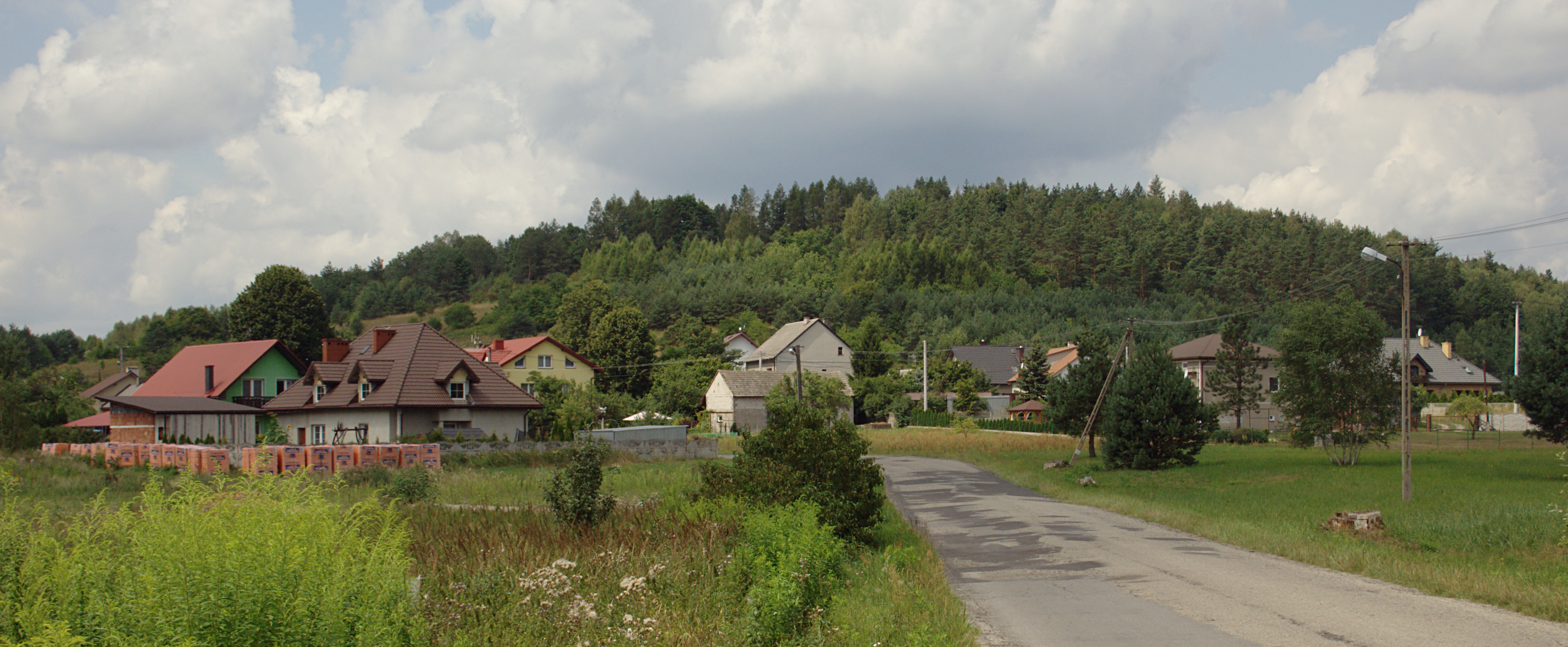

- Location within Poland
- Coordinates: 50°24′N 19°38′E
- Country: Poland
- Voivodeship: Lesser Poland
- County: Olkusz
- Gmina: Klucze
- Population (approx.): 500

Krzywopłoty [kʂɨvɔˈpwɔtɨ] is a village in the administrative district of Gmina Klucze, within Olkusz County, Lesser Poland Voivodeship, in southern Poland.

The village has an approximate population of 500.
