= Music in World War II =

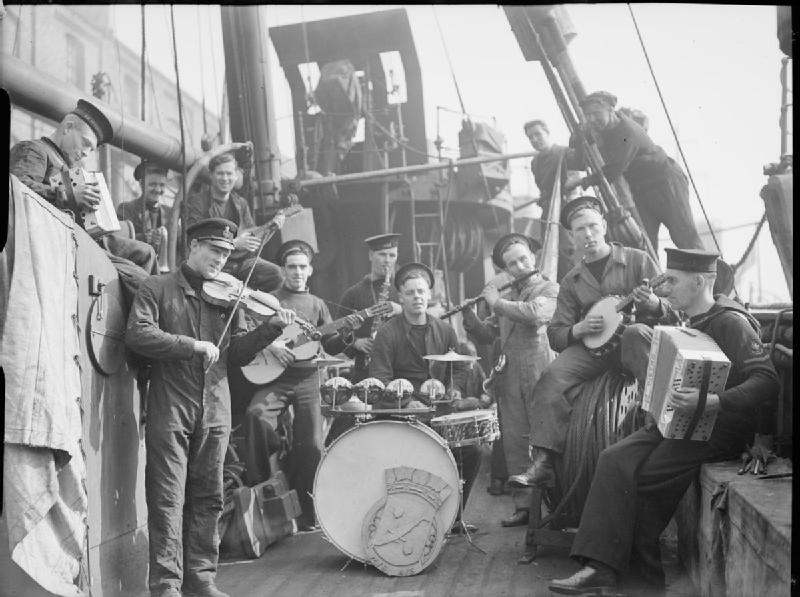
Royal Navy crew members aboard a minesweeper perform as part of an amateur dance band.

World War II was the first conflict to take place in the age of electronically distributed music.

Many people in the war had a pressing need to be able to listen to 78-rpm shellac records and the radio en masse. By 1940, 96.2% of Northeastern American urban households had radio. The lowest American demographic to embrace mass-distributed music, Southern rural families, still had one radio for every two households.

Similar adoption rates and mass distribution of music occurred in Europe. During Nazi rule, radio ownership in Germany rose from 4 to 16 million households. As the major powers entered the war, millions of citizens had home radio devices that did not exist in the First World War.

Therefore, World War II was a unique situation for music and its relationship to warfare. Never before was it possible for not only single songs, but also single recordings of songs to be so widely distributed to the population. Never before had the number of listeners to a single performance (a recording or broadcast production) been so high. Along with that, never before had states had so much power to determine not only what songs were performed and listened to, but also to control the recordings, not allowing local people to alter the songs in their own performances. Though local people still sang and produced songs, this form of music faced serious new competition from centralized electronic music.

== German-English song ==
"Lili Marlene" was the most popular song of World War II with both German and British forces. Based on a German poem, the song was recorded in both English and German. The poem was set to music in 1938 and was a hit with troops in the Afrika Korps. Mobile desert combat required a large number of radio units, and the British troops in the North African Campaign started to enjoy the song so much that it was quickly translated into English. The song was used throughout the war as a propaganda tool.

== American music ==
American troops had regular access to radio in all but the most difficult combat situations, and not only did soldiers know specific songs but also specific recordings. This gave a nature to American troops' music during WWII: not as many songs were sung around a fire or while marching, but instead were listened to between combat on Armed Forces Radio.

- "Amor" - Andy Russell with Al Sack & His Orchestra (1944)
- "Ac-Cent-Tchu-Ate The Positive" - Johnny Mercer (1944)
- "Bésame Mucho" - Andy Russell with Al Sack & His Orchestra
- "Be Careful, It's My Heart" - Composer: Irving Berlin - From: Movie Holiday Inn (1942)
- "Boogie Woogie Bugle Boy" - Andrews Sisters (1941)"
- "Comin' In on a Wing and a Prayer" - The Song Spinners
- "Der Fuehrer's Face" - Spike Jones and his City Slickers (1943)
- "Remember Pearl Harbor" - Sammy Kaye (1942)
- "Don't Fence Me In" - Bing Crosby and The Andrews Sisters (Cover)
- "Don't Get Around Much Anymore (Never No Lament)" - Duke Ellington & His Orchestra
- "Don't Sit Under The Apple Tree (With Anyone Else But Me)" - Composer: Lew Brown, Sam H. Stept, and Charlie Tobias (1942)
- "Ev'ry Time We Say Goodbye" - Composer: Cole Porter - From: musical Seven Lively Arts (1944)
- "G.I. Jive" - Johnny Mercer
- "I Don't Want To Walk Without You" - Harry James & His Orchestra Composer: Frank Loesser and Jule Styne - From: Movie Sweater Girl (1942), performed by Betty Jane Rhodes
- "I Wonder" - Louis Armstrong
- I'll Be Seeing You - The Ink Spots/Bing Crosby Words by Irving Kahal, music by Sammy Fain
- "I'll Get By (As Long As I Have You)" - Ink Spots
- "I'll Walk Alone" - Martha Tilton
- "It's Been A Long, Long Time" - Harry James & His Orchestra
- "Long Ago (And Far Away)" - Jo Stafford Composer: Ira Gershwin and Jerome Kern - From: musical Cover Girl (1944)
- "Kiss the Boys Goodbye" - Composer: Frank Loesser and Victor Schertzinger - From: movie Kiss the Boys Goodbye (1941)
- "Praise the Lord and Pass the Ammunition" - Composer: Frank Loesser (1942)
- "Sentimental Journey" - Les Brown & His Orchestra; Composer: Bud Green, Les Brown, and Ben Homer – (1944)
- "(There'll Be Bluebirds Over) The White Cliffs of Dover" - Jimmy Dorsey & His Orchestra (1942)
- "Till Then" - Mills Brothers
- "Waitin' For The Train To Come In" - Peggy Lee
- "What a Diff'rence a Day Made" - Andy Russell with Paul Weston & His Orchestra (1944)
- "When The Lights Go On Again (All Over The World)" - Vaughn Monroe & His Orchestra (1943)
- You'd Be So Nice To Come Home To - Composer: Cole Porter - From: musical Something to Shout About – (1943)
- "Yours" - Jimmy Dorsey & His Orchestra

In a nod to the special services and sacrifices the troops were making both overseas as well as domestically, many of these songs were specially re-recorded by their original artists for a Department of Defense musical and morale mission entitled V-Discs for the exclusive consumption by military personnel, similar to Armed Forces Radio.

As the United States was able to utilize the exponential growth of the technological age to compose music, in Sounds of War: Music in the United States during World War II, it is made clear that music had various purposes, but more importantly, it mentions the tension that grew between institutions in order to find the right way to use music for U.S. overall interest. Examples can be seen throughout the different types of songs being produced and publicized during this time. Songs like I'll Be Seeing You (1938) and Praise the Lord and Pass the Ammunition (1942) were songs that kept the citizens back in the U.S. calm and hopeful for the return of their loved ones. On the other hand, these songs had other effects on the soldiers fighting abroad. For them, songs like these brought nostalgia and homesickness.

With the war continuing through the 1940s, other initiatives to muster morale arose. With drafting numbers reaching close to 500,000, the Defense institutions began to make military bands on the home front, to support patriotism and nationalism. The first patriotic war song of WWII in the U.S. was "God Bless America," written by Irving Berlin for a World War I wartime revue, but it was withheld and later revised and used in World War II. There were many other patriotic wartime songs during this time such as, "A Nightingale Sang in Berkeley Square" by Glenn Miller and "Arms for the Love of America" by Irving Berlin in 1941.

After the successful incorporation of music into the war efforts, more was needed in order to keep hopes alive and stable in the U.S. and on the front. At various times music was used as a tool for war, whether it was to entertain or to recuperate soldiers. Furthermore, consideration must be given to the impact that music had on people then and the effect that it continues to have now. Sounds of War: Music in the United States during World War II argues that music composed during the 1940s was unlike any other era of music because of its emphasis on making the listener feel like they are part of the war or if they are somewhere else. It adds that songs from World War II continue to be used today in order to remember those harsh times of war and to remind everyone of the costs of liberty and freedom. Some examples of this would include Aaron Copland's "Fanfare for the Common Man" (1942) and "Lincoln Portrait" (1942). These are still played for presidential inaugurations and continue to have the effect of "loss for freedom".

During the 1940s the United States State Department also encouraged the mutual exchange of music on the radio with the neutral countries of Latin America in order to promote President Franklin Roosevelt's Good Neighbor policy and Pan-Americanism. Through the establishment of the Office of the Coordinator of Inter-American Affairs (OIAA), President Roosevelt utilized music as a form of cultural diplomacy in order to improve international relations with Latin America and forestall the spread of military hostilities throughout the Americas. Professional musicians and composers from both North and South America were invited to concertize together on radio shows such as Viva América to support these efforts. Included among these musicians were: Alfredo Antonini, Juan Arvizu, Nestor Mesta Chayres, Eva Garza, Elsa Miranda, Miguel Sandoval, John Serry Sr. and Terig Tucci.

In the years immediately after World War II, the United States Army continued to utilize music as a form of cultural diplomacy amidst the ruins of western Europe. In 1952, the Seventh Army Symphony Orchestra was established under the musical direction of the composer Samuel Adler in an effort to demonstrate the shared musical heritage of the United States and Europe. Through a series of live musical performances and broadcasts over the Armed Forces Radio Services network, the orchestra successfully promoted mutual understanding and peace between the German and American people for a decade until 1962.

The role of music not only had effects in the international sphere but in the domestic society of the United States as well, since the prolific number of war songs caused the number of concerts performed to greatly increase, along with the incorporation of women and African American musicians into military bands and groups.

== Japanese music ==
- Nikudan san'yūshi (肉弾三勇士, The Three Brave Human Bullets)
- Aikoku kōshinkyoku (愛國行進曲, Patriotism March)
- Hawaii kaisen (ハワイ海戰, Hawaii Naval Battle)
- Taiheiyō kōshinkyoku (太平洋行進曲, Pacific Ocean March)
- Hinomaru kōshinkyoku (日の丸行進曲, Hinomaru March)
- Roei no uta (露營の歌, Song of the Bivouac)
- Shingun-swingu (進軍スウィング, Marching-Swing)
- Aiba shingunka (愛馬進軍歌, Favorite Horse's Marching Song)
- Aikoku no hana (愛國の花, Flower of Patriotism)
- Kōgun banzai (皇軍万歳, Long Live the Imperial Army) (A jazz song despite its title. Performed by Tadaharu Nakano and the Nakano Columbia Rhythm Boys.)
- Moshi, moshi, kame-yo (もしもし龜よ, Hello, Hello, Turtle!)
- Manshū-gurashi (満洲ぐらし, Joyous Life in Manchukuo)
- Wakare no burūsu (別れのブルース, Farewell Blues)
- Ajia burūsu (亞細亞ブルース, Asia Blues)
- Shanhai burūsu (上海ブルース, Shanghai Blues)
- Manshū musume (満洲娘, Manchurian Girl)
- Umi yukaba (海行かば, If I Go to the Sea)
- Asa (朝, Dawn)
- Tonarigumi (隣組, Neighborhood Association)
- Nan'yō kōro (南洋航路, South Sea Route)
- Parao koishi-ya (パラオ戀しや, Beloved missing Palau)
- Ume no burūsu (雨のブルース, Rainy Blues)
- Soshū yakyoku (蘇州夜曲, Suzhou Nocturne)
- Chaina Tango (チャイナ・タンゴ, China Tango)
- Shina no yoru (支那の夜, China Nights)
- Gunkoku komori-uta (軍國子守唄, Lullaby of a War-time Country)
- Nyan-nyan matsuri (娘々祭 「満洲から北支へ」, Nyan-Nyan(From Chinese = Girls) Festival from the Takarazuka Revue show, From Manchuria to North China)
- Kigen' nisenrop'yaku-nen (紀元二千六百年, Year 2,600 (of Japan's Foundation))
- Shussei heishi o okuru uta (出征兵士を送る歌, Song for Sending Off the Soldiers to the Front)
- Manira no machikado-de (マニラの街角で, On the Street Corners of Manila)
- Batabiya no yoru wa fukete (バタビヤの夜は更けて, Midnight(Late at Night) in Batavia)
- Ashita wa otochi-ka (明日はお立ちか, When You Depart Tomorrow)
- Chichi yo, anata wa tsuyokatta (父よあなたは強かった, Father, you were strong)
- Bakudan gurai wa te de uke-yo (爆弾位は手で受けよ, You Can Catch the Bomb by the Hands)

== British popular music and the BBC ==
During the war, the BBC was forced to adapt, if only because British soldiers were listening to German radio stations to hear dance music. This adaptation did not commence without conflict. The BBC increased the amount of dance music played, but censorship was severe. The American hit "Coming in on a Wing and a Prayer," for example, was censored because of its almost blasphemous mix of religious words and a foxtrot melody. BBC heads were also worried about American-style crooners undermining the virility of British men.

The BBC tried hard to stick to the jaunty tone which they felt had helped to win the first world war - so George Formby and Gracie Fields were regularly played.

Britain did have a mass media which played popular music, much enjoyed by the Germans stationed in France and the Low Countries or flying over Britain. The most famous single performer was Vera Lynn who became known as "the forces' sweetheart".

Popular concert songs in Britain during the war included:

- Run, Rabbit, Run - Sung by Flanagan and Allen (1939) Words by Noel Gay & Ralph Butler. Music by Noel Gay.
- There'll Always Be An England (1939–40) Words by Hughie Charles. Music by Ross Parker. Sung by Vera Lynn.
- We'll Meet Again Words and Music by Ross Parker and Hughie Charles (1939)

This is perhaps the most famous wartime song with the lines:

_{We'll meet again}
_{Don't know where}
_{Don't know when}
_{But I know we'll meet again some sunny day}

Vera Lynn's recording was memorably played during an apocalyptic scene in Dr. Strangelove; the Byrds covered it (to similarly ironic effect) on their first album.

- Kiss Me Goodnight, Sergeant-Major (1939), words by Don Pelosi, music by Art Noel
- We're Going to Hang out the Washing on the Siegfried Line (1939), words by Jimmy Kennedy, music by Michael Carr
- (There'll Be Bluebirds Over) The White Cliffs of Dover Words by Nat Burton and Music by Walter Kent (1941–42)
- When the Lights Go on Again Written by Eddie Seller, Sol Marcus, and Bennie Benjamin

The theme tune of the TV series Dad's Army, "Who do you think you are kidding, Mr Hitler?" does not date from the war, although it was intended as a gentle pastiche of wartime songs. With lyrics by Jimmy Perry and music by Perry and Derek Taverner, it was sung by one of Perry's childhood idols, wartime entertainer Bud Flanagan who died in 1968, soon after the first episode played.

== Soviet music ==
- "The Sacred War"
- "Katyusha"
- "Blue Kerchief"
- "Dark Is the Night"
- "Farewell of Slavianka"
- "March of the Soviet Tankmen"
- "Three Tankists"
- "March of the Artillerymen"
- "March of the Defenders of Moscow"
- "Ogoniok" (Beacon)
- "Oy, Tumany" (Oh, the Fogs)
- "V lesu prifrontovom" (In a forest near the front)
- "Ždi Menya" (Await Me)
- "Smuglyanka"
- Symphony No. 7 (Shostakovich)

== German music ==
The Nazi government took a strong interest in promoting Germanic culture and music, which returned people to the folk culture of their remote ancestors while promoting the distribution of radio to transmit propaganda. The Nazi government had an obsession with controlling culture and promoting the culture it controlled. For this reason, the common people's tastes in music were much more secret. Many Germans used their new radios to listen to the jazz music hated by Hitler but loved all over the world.

In art, this attack came after expressionism, impressionism, and all forms of modernism. Forms of music targeted included jazz as well as the music of many of the more dissonant modern classical composers, including that of Igor Stravinsky, Paul Hindemith, and Arnold Schoenberg. Hindemith was one of many composers who fled the Third Reich as a result of musical persecution (as well as racial persecution, since Hindemith's wife, was part Jewish). Modern composers who took a more conventional approach to music, however, were welcomed by the Third Reich; Carl Orff and Richard Strauss, for example, were able to stay in the country during the Nazi period.

Also, a subtle factor of history makes gaining a reliable picture of the music of Germany more difficult than among the Allies. World War II in the English speaking world is usually remembered as a great triumph and the music is often performed with a sense of pride. Therefore, over time the collective consciousness of this period's music has become stronger. In Germany, World War II is generally seen as a shameful period; it would be difficult to imagine a band playing 'all the old favourites' of World War II in a public place.

Popular music is tied with nostalgia and collective memory. Though a historian can find samples of music that were played on the radio or can collect soldiers' songs from a period, ranking the subjective meaning and value assigned to a song by the people of that period will be greatly impacted by those subjects' later opinion of that music.

For example, it is known that many Germans enjoyed American jazz, and it is also known that Germans sang songs in Nazi sponsored events, but it would be difficult to determine the relative popularity of this music in the current context of shame concerning the war.

Therefore, the best that can be understood about German Music during the war is the official Nazi government policy, the level of enforcement, and some notion of the diversity of other music listened to, but as the losers in the war German Music and Nazi songs from World War II has not been assigned the high heroic status of American and British popular music. As the music itself goes, however, it is considered by many as being above the level of the latter, which is also true of Fascist Italian music of the time.

=== Approved and unapproved German music ===
The Nazis were dedicated to the concept that German Culture was the greatest in history, but, as with all parts of art, Hitler took an interest in suppressing the work of all those he considered "unfit" while promoting certain composers as proper Germans. All musicians were required to join the Reichsmusikkammer, or "Reich Music Chamber", part of the Reich Chamber of Culture founded by Joseph Goebbels in 1933. Membership required a so-called Aryan certificate, meaning that Jewish musicians could no longer work.

Along with exhibitions of "degenerate art" (entartete Kunst) the Nazi government identified certain music, composers and performers as entartete Musik. Designation into this category was based upon the race, ethnicity, and political orientation of the composers and performers in question. The works of Jewish classical composers were banned, including those of Gustav Mahler, Felix Mendelssohn, Arnold Schoenberg, George Gershwin and Claude Debussy (who had a Jewish wife). The popular music of Irving Berlin (also Jewish) was completely banned.

In 1938 Nazi Germany passed an official law on Jazz music. Not surprisingly it deals with the racial nature of the music and makes laws based on racial theories. Jazz was "Negroid"; It posed a threat to European higher culture, and was therefore forbidden except in the case of scientific study.

=== Music permitted under the Nazis ===
The Reichsmusikkammer promoted classical music by German composers such as Beethoven and Wagner, as well as Austrians such as Mozart. Military music was also promoted, but lighter, non-political music was a source of escapism for many. The Wunschkonzert für die Wehrmacht, or "Request Concert for the Armed Forces", was a radio program broadcast from Berlin. The subject of a 1940 film, it consisted of live music requested by soldiers. Connecting the military to the home front and vice versa, contributed to the Volksgemeinschaft, the Nazi concept of a "people's community".

Degrees of censorship varied, and the Germans were likely more concerned with the war than styles of music. But as the war went poorly the objectives of the government moved from building a perfect German state to keeping the population in line, and the relative importance of morale-raising songs would have increased.

Popular songs were officially encouraged during the war including:

- "Berlin bleibt doch Berlin!" (Berlin is still Berlin) (words Bruno Balz, music Will Meisel) was popular with Joseph Goebbels near the fall of Berlin.
- "Erika", a marching song about a soldier who misses his fiancée, does not have political lyrics, but its composer, Herms Niel, had joined the Nazi Party in 1934.

Goebbels commissioned a swing band called "Charlie and His Orchestra" which existed for supplying propaganda to British and American troops over the radio. Popular tunes were sung in English with Nazi propaganda. The musicians were competent (they were spoofing highly polished Big Band music). As an example, the singers would twist a hit such as Bob Hope's "Thanks for the Memory" with a taunt to English-speaking soldiers about the fall of Singapore, rhyming "Singapore" with "we don't go there anymore".

== Polish music ==
There were specific songs of Polish resistance, Polish Armed Forces in the West and Polish Armed Forces in the East. These included Siekiera, motyka, the most popular song in occupied Poland; "Rozszumiały się wierzby płaczące" - a song associated with the Polish partisans; Czerwone maki na Monte Cassino - a song connected with the Polish Armed Forces in the West; Oka, a favourite song of the Polish Armed Forces in the East, and Marsz Gwardii Ludowej - a song also known as Partisans' Song anthem of GL.

== Propaganda against the enemy ==
They played a few American records first. I don't remember everything she said. She said, "Your wives and girlfriends are probably home in a nice warm building, dancing with some other men. You're over here in the cold." It was cold and it was snowing. Dent Wheeler on Axis Sally during the battle of the Bulge

"There is no 'Tokyo Rose'; the name is strictly a GI invention. The name has been applied to at least two lilting Japanese voices on the Japanese radio. Government monitors listening in 24 hours a day have never heard the words 'Tokyo Rose' over a Japanese-controlled Far Eastern radio."

During World War II, often cut off troops or isolated outposts found themselves exposed in the radio range of the enemy, which used popular music as a means to attract listeners and then provide propaganda messages.

This type of propaganda was performed by both sides and is some of the earliest mass psych-ops. Often the propagandist was listened to by the other sides, and there is little evidence that these had any impact, except that the Axis participants were often detained and if originally from allied countries prosecuted, while Allied broadcasters were seen as legitimate in Allied countries. Again it shows the way music is understood in the context of World War II is from the winners' point of view, whereas Tokyo Rose (Iva Ikuko Toguri D'Aquino) and Axis Sally (Mildred Gillars) faced years of persecution after the war. England executed Lord Haw Haw (William Joyce) for treason, in 1946.

== Songs, compositions and others written after the war ==
- Threnody to the Victims of Hiroshima, by Krzysztof Penderecki in 1960
- From Here to Eternity by George Duning and Morris Stoloff was nominated for an Academy Award for best musical score.
- The Hiroshima Symphony, by Erkki Aaltonen in 1949
- A Survivor from Warsaw, by Arnold Schoenberg describes the horrors of the Warsaw Ghetto Uprising.
- On The Nameless Height
- Sink the Bismark (sic, later corrected to "Sink the Bismarck"), a 1960 song by Johnny Horton about the sinking of that battleship in 1941.
- Cabaret - Musical produced and directed by Hal Prince in 1966, narrates the Nazi Party ascent to power, featuring a song expressing Nazi ideology "Tomorrow Belongs to Me".
- Mel Brooks' The Producers is famous for perhaps the strangest song about World War II, "Springtime for Hitler".

== See also ==
- Music and political warfare
- Interpretive communities
