= Michał Rola-Żymierski =

Marshal of Poland

Marshal Michał Rola-Żymierski
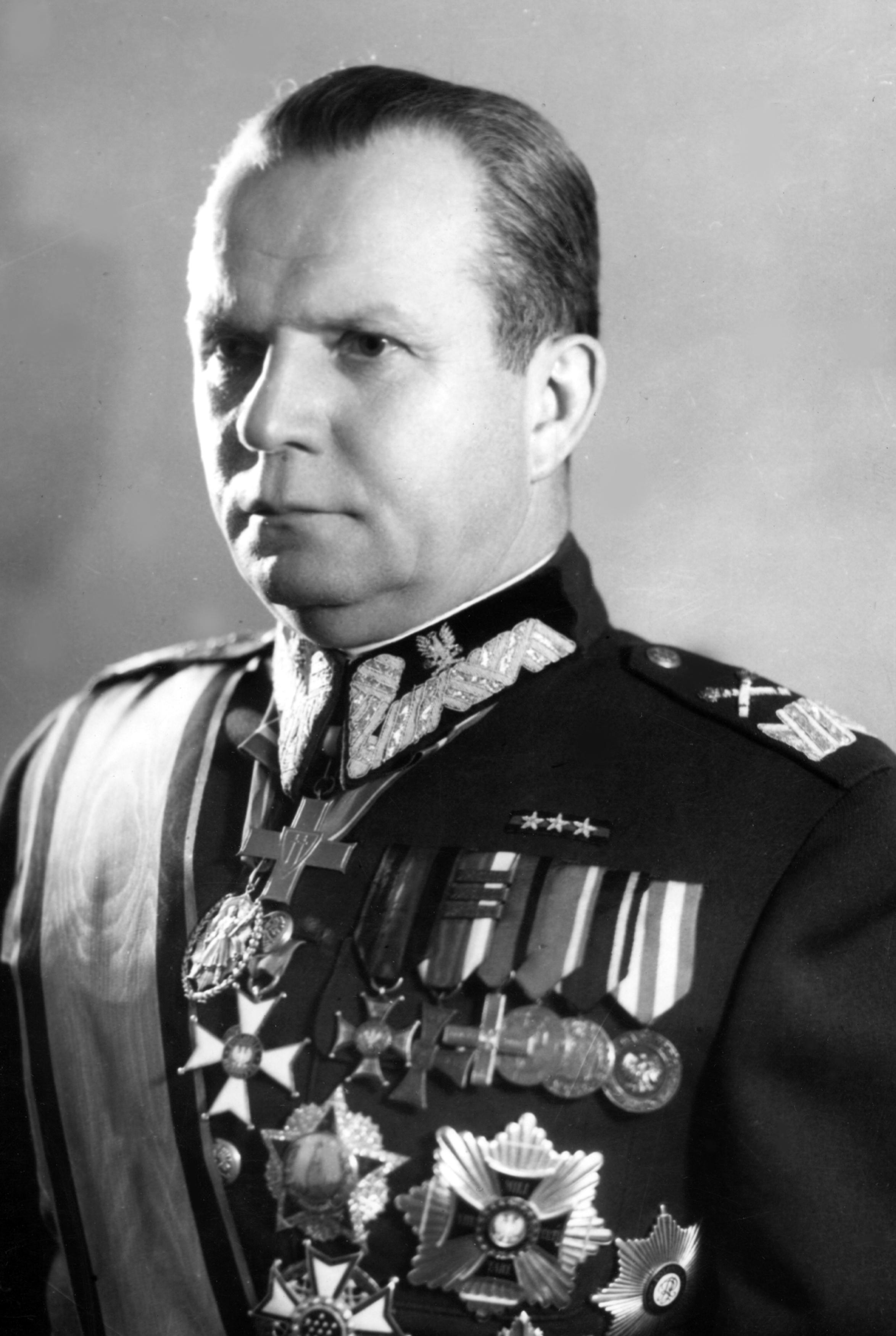
- Michał Rola-Żymierski as Marshal of Poland

Minister of National Defence
- In office 5 July 1945 – 6 November 1949
- Prime Minister: Edward Osóbka-Morawski (1945–1947); Józef Cyrankiewicz (1947–1949)
- General Secretary: Bolesław Bierut
- Preceded by: Marian Kukiel (as Minister of National Defence of the Polish government-in-exile)
- Succeeded by: Konstantin Rokossovsky

Personal details
- Born: Michał Łyżwiński; 4 September 1890 Kraków, Austria-Hungary
- Died: 15 October 1989 (aged 99) Warsaw, Polish People's Republic
- Party: Communist Party of Poland (1931–1938); Polish Workers' Party (1943–1948); Polish United Workers' Party (1948–1989)

Military service
- Allegiance: Austria-Hungary; Second Polish Republic; Polish People's Republic
- Branch/service: Austro-Hungarian Army (1911–1914); Polish Legions (1914–1919); Polish Army (1919–1927); People's Guard (1942–1944); People's Army (1944); Polish People's Army (1944–1989)
- Years of service: 1911–1927; 1942–1949
- Rank: Marszałek Polski (Marshal of Poland)
- Commands: Gwardia Ludowa
- Battles/wars: World War I Polish-Soviet War; 1926 Polish Coup d'Etat; World War II

Michał Rola-Żymierski (pronounced [ˈmixaw ˈrɔla ʐɨˈmjɛrskʲi]; born Michał Łyżwiński; 4 September 1890 – 15 October 1989) was a Polish general and communist politician who was Marshal of Poland and Minister of National Defence of the Polish People's Republic. A decorated officer of the Polish Legions and the Polish–Soviet War, he became one of the youngest generals of interwar Poland, but in 1927 he was convicted of corruption over army contracts and expelled from the army.

Żymierski worked for Soviet intelligence in 1932–1937 and 1942–1945. During World War II, he commanded the communist Armia Ludowa, and in 1944 he became commander-in-chief of the Polish forces formed under Soviet sponsorship. He was replaced as defence minister by the Soviet marshal Konstantin Rokossovsky in 1949, arrested in 1953 and released in 1955, and he later held senior posts in banking, in the ruling party and in the veterans' movement.

== Early life ==
Żymierski was born Michał Łyżwiński on 4 September 1890 in Kraków, then part of the Austrian Partition, the son of the railway clerk Wojciech Łyżwiński and Maria née Buczek. From 1902, he attended the St Anne's Gymnasium in Kraków, passing several years with distinction, and he took his school-leaving examination in 1910. He then studied law at the Jagiellonian University and economics at the Kraków Commercial Academy. From 1909, he was active in the independence movement, first in the youth organisation Zarzewie and then in the Polish Rifle Squads, and the Great Russian Encyclopedia states that he helped to found the Society of Polish Rifle Squads in 1911. Under the name Artur Żymierski, he was a delegate of the Lwów district command of the clandestine Polish Army organisation.

In September 1911, Żymierski enlisted in the Austro-Hungarian Army as a one-year volunteer, serving with the 2nd Tyrolean Kaiserjäger Regiment in Bozen, where he completed the school for reserve officers. In September 1912, he was promoted to Fähnrich and transferred to the reserve.

After his brother Jan took part in the robbery and murder of the manager of the Gebethner i Wolff bookshop in Kraków on 30 September 1913, Michał began to call himself Żymirski. When the Żymirski family, whose members included the general Franciszek Żymirski, objected, he added a letter to form Żymierski. According to the historian Bogusław Kopka, the change was never made formally, and Michał simply began to sign himself first Żymirski and then Żymierski. His brother Józef also took the new surname. The historian Jerzy Eisler notes that he used the form Żymirski early in his career. Rola was a pseudonym that he adopted during World War II.

== Military career ==
=== World War I ===
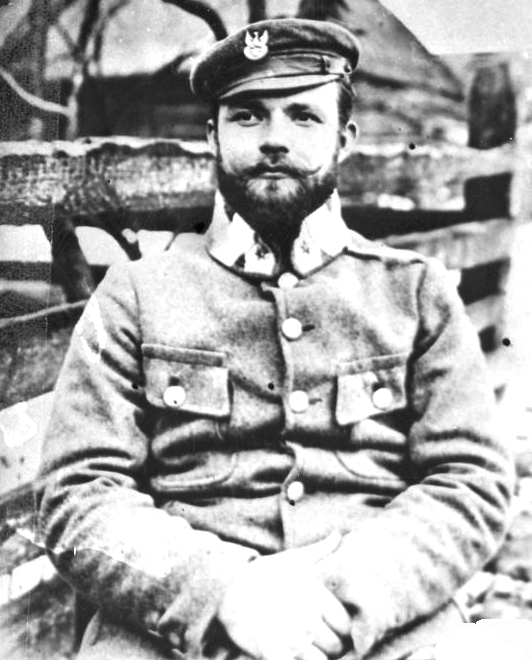
Żymierski during the First World War

In July 1914, Żymierski was called up as a reserve officer and sent to the Serbian front, but rather than wait for his request for a transfer to the Polish Legions to be approved, he made his own way to their 2nd Cadre Company. He served in the Legions as a company and battalion commander in the 1st Brigade. He led a daring attack at the Battle of Łaski and was wounded three times on the Eastern Front. Near the Dęblin Fortress, he was seriously wounded on 23 October 1914, and he spent the period until July 1915 recovering in the General Hospital in Vienna, where he spoke briefly with Archduke Charles Stephen during a visit on 28 December 1914. In her diary entry of 8 May 1917, Princess Maria Lubomirska recorded that he fought under an assumed name because his brother was a murderer, that the painter Jacek Malczewski had portrayed him and that Jerzy Mycielski had nursed him through grave wounds.

In the summer of 1915, by then a major, Żymierski became commander of the Polish Military Organisation, and he later commanded regiments in the 1st and 2nd Brigades. He was promoted to lieutenant colonel on 1 November 1916. In July 1917, he took command of the 2nd Infantry Regiment of the 2nd Legions Brigade in the Polish Auxiliary Corps.

In February 1918, after the signing of the Treaty of Brest-Litovsk with Ukraine, which assigned the Chełm region to Ukraine, Żymierski initiated the mutiny of the 2nd Brigade and its breakthrough across the front at the Rarańcza. He handed command of the brigade to Józef Haller and, promoted to colonel, became chief of staff of the Polish II Corps in Russia. After the Germans disarmed the corps following the Battle of Kaniów in May 1918, he held command posts in the Polish Military Organisation in Russia, including command of the 2nd Infantry Regiment in Lucjan Żeligowski's 4th Rifle Division.

=== Polish–Soviet War ===
In 1919, Żymierski joined the Polish Army, and he was later confirmed in the rank of colonel with seniority from 1 June 1919. In March 1919, he was appointed commander of the Ciechanów Military District. In August 1919, during the First Silesian Uprising, he headed the branch of the Supreme Command that directed the insurgents in Upper Silesia. In the Polish–Soviet War, he commanded a brigade on the Berezina and then, from 10 August 1920, the 2nd Legions Infantry Division, which fought against Semyon Budyonny's 1st Cavalry Army at Komarów and Hrubieszów. His conduct in the war earned him the praise of his superiors, including Edward Rydz-Śmigły and Władysław Sikorski, and the Silver Cross of the Virtuti Militari. In a 1921 evaluation, Rydz-Śmigły described him as a talented and dutiful staff officer, an excellent educator of officers and a very good administrator with great initiative.

=== Interwar career and conviction ===
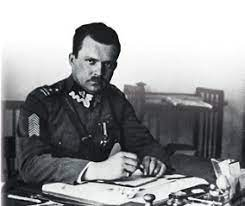
Żymierski as deputy head of the army administration (1924)

In 1922–1923, Żymierski studied at the École supérieure de guerre in Paris and then trained with the French General Staff. On 1 December 1924, at the age of 35, he was promoted to brigadier general with seniority from 15 August 1924, ranking second in seniority among Polish generals, and by 1928 he had moved to first place. He was appointed deputy head of the army administration in the Ministry of Military Affairs, with responsibility for arms procurement and finance. One of his subordinates there was Felicjan Sławoj Składkowski, the future prime minister, who later remarked in his memoirs that Żymierski had a flair for business, perhaps too great a one. He received the Commander's Cross of the Order of Polonia Restituta in 1925.

During Józef Piłsudski's May Coup of 1926, Żymierski sided with the government, supervising the transport of troops from Poznań towards Warsaw and leading a group that advanced on the capital from the Sochaczew area. After the coup, he was arrested together with Generals Tadeusz Rozwadowski, Juliusz Malczewski and Włodzimierz Zagórski. The other generals were taken to the Antokol prison in Wilno, while Żymierski was held in Warsaw, and on 20 August 1926 he was brought from prison to the Belweder for a conversation with Piłsudski.

On 6 September 1927, the Military District Court No. I in Warsaw, presided over by Brigadier General Bronisław Sikorski, sentenced Żymierski to five years of hard imprisonment and expulsion from the army for financial abuses in army supply contracts with the gas-mask maker Protekta. The bench included Generals Wiktor Thommée and Michał Tokarzewski-Karaszewicz, and nearly 100 witnesses were called, among them Generals Kazimierz Pławski and Władysław Sikorski. According to Anna Zechenter, writing in Dziennik Polski in 2010, the court found that he had knowingly used his position to cause the treasury a loss of 150,000 US dollars, and that he had deliberately held up the delivery of fire extinguishers in a rigged tender. The historian Jerzy Eisler describes the case as speculation in the purchase of gas masks. Żymierski was demoted to private, stripped of his decorations and expelled from the army. He served his sentence in Mokotów Prison in Warsaw and in Cieszyn, and he was released in 1931.

The case remained contested. The politician Karol Popiel later claimed that the prosecution was Piłsudski's political revenge, intended to discredit Władysław Sikorski indirectly. Writing in 2002 in Głos Kombatanta Armii Ludowej, a magazine of veterans of the communist People's Army, Norbert Michta argued that the charges were fabricated and that Piłsudski had first offered Żymierski the command of the Higher Military School if he would reveal Sikorski's business dealings, which he refused to do. The historian Andrzej Garlicki wrote that Żymierski's political backers deliberately presented him solely as a victim of the Sanation regime's revenge for his part in the May Coup. According to Piotr Gontarczyk, some writers in communist Poland omitted the episode or wrote only that he had left the country in 1927. In his review of Pałka and Poksiński's 2015 biography, Eisler wrote that it had definitively clarified the gas-mask affair.

== Soviet intelligence and exile ==
While in prison, Żymierski made contact with communists and abandoned his earlier political views. After his release in 1931, he moved to France and joined the Communist Party of Poland. He was recruited by Soviet intelligence in 1932 and worked for it in Paris until 1937, when contact was broken during the Great Purge. In a study published by the Institute of National Remembrance, Jerzy Węgierski attributes the recruitment to the foreign department of the NKVD, or possibly to Red Army military intelligence. According to Gontarczyk, he supplied information on the organisation and training of the Polish Army and on the Ministry of Military Affairs' transactions in France, and he recruited agents for Soviet intelligence among Polish officers. According to Jacek Wijaczka, the Soviets ended the cooperation because they suspected him of passing on false information. His brothers Stanisław and Józef were also Soviet agents. He returned to Warsaw in 1938 and tried without success to rejoin the army.

== World War II ==
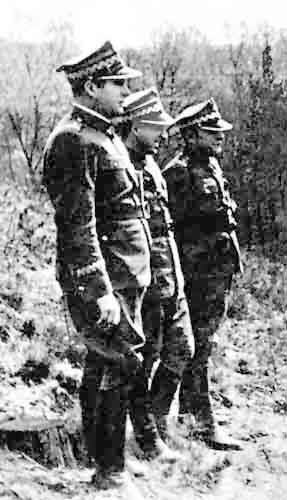
Generals Karol Świerczewski, Marian Spychalski and Żymierski on the Lusatian Neisse

After the German invasion of Poland, the Gestapo searched Żymierski's flat in Warsaw on 27 October 1939, but he was not arrested, reportedly because of the intercession of Antoni Lewandowski, a Polish agent of the Gestapo. The historian Jarosław Pałka concludes that Lewandowski was Żymierski's main contact until mid-1942 and that Żymierski had close and regular contact with a German agent. The defector Józef Światło later claimed that Żymierski had passed reports to the Gestapo on Soviet orders. During the occupation, he kept in touch with the communist group Hammer and Sickle.

On 22 February 1940, an underground civic court suspended the effects of his 1927 sentence, although Pałka stresses that the body had no legal standing. Żymierski repeatedly tried to join the Union of Armed Struggle and the Home Army but was turned down. In 1941, the politician Stefan Korboński refused to negotiate with him on behalf of the underground.

In 1940, Żymierski again offered his services to Soviet intelligence, which contacted him only in 1942 through Józef Małecki, a member of an NKVD network, and tasked him with gathering information on the Polish underground. In the spring of 1942, Soviet agents parachuted into Poland brought him a letter from his brother Stanisław, and he remained in contact with Soviet intelligence until 1945. From the spring of 1943, he was a secret member of the Polish Workers' Party. In May 1943, he became a military adviser to the staff of the communist Gwardia Ludowa under the name Józef. On 1 January 1944, he was appointed commander of the Armia Ludowa, adopting the pseudonym Rola, and he became a member of the presidium of the State National Council. In mid-1944, he went to Moscow, where he took part in talks with Soviet leaders as part of the council's delegation.

On 21 July 1944, Żymierski was promoted to generał broni and became commander-in-chief of the Polish Army, and he headed the department of national defence of the Polish Committee of National Liberation until December 1944. Writing in the Swedish journal Svensk Tidskrift in 1952, Berndt Hult stated that the Soviet Union had installed him as supreme commander of the Polish forces and that his control of the military leadership secured the new regime's hold on the armed forces. In December 1944, he became Minister of National Defence in the Provisional Government of the Republic of Poland. Minutes of the Polish communist leadership from that month record that in talks with Joseph Stalin he argued for a separate Polish front, but that Stalin appeared to disagree, mainly because of a shortage of equipment.

On 27 December 1944, Żymierski delegated to his commanders the power to award the Virtuti Militari for battlefield conduct, but on 16 November 1945 he cancelled the order and reserved the right to decorate all soldiers of the Polish Army to himself. The presidium of the State National Council made him Marshal of Poland on 3 May 1945. The Polish government-in-exile, which was then still internationally recognised, never confirmed the appointment, and the Armed Forces Delegation for Poland issued a leaflet condemning him as a traitor in Soviet service and blaming him for heavy losses of the 1st Polish Army in Pomerania. The State National Council's presidium awarded him the Grand Cross of the Virtuti Militari with Star by a resolution of 11 May 1945.

== Minister of National Defence ==
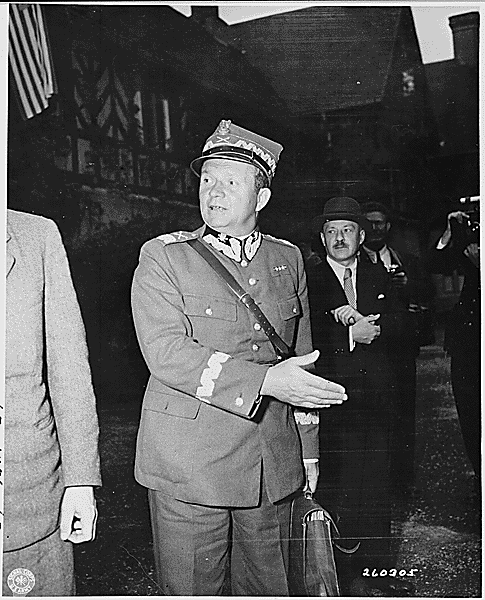
Żymierski during the Potsdam Conference in July 1945

On 8 May 1945, at a meeting of the Council of Ministers attended by Bolesław Bierut, Żymierski proposed that 8 May be made a national holiday of victory and freedom. In March 1945, he had argued at a meeting in Kraków that Cieszyn Silesia, being mostly Polish, should belong to Poland rather than to Czechoslovakia. In June 1945, during the border dispute with Czechoslovakia, he mobilised the 1st Armoured Corps and, under operational order no. 00336, ordered it to take up positions on a line between Prudnik and Cieszyn. According to Anna Sobór-Świderska, he issued an ultimatum to Czechoslovakia on 15 June while standing in for the absent prime minister, and after its rejection Polish troops entered Cieszyn Silesia and a further advance beyond the Olza was announced. The political leadership soon halted the order.

On 24 July 1945, Żymierski attended the Potsdam Conference. On 9 August 1945, he received the Soviet Order of Victory, which was presented to him in November of that year. In October 1945, American general Dwight D. Eisenhower decorated him with the Legion of Merit.

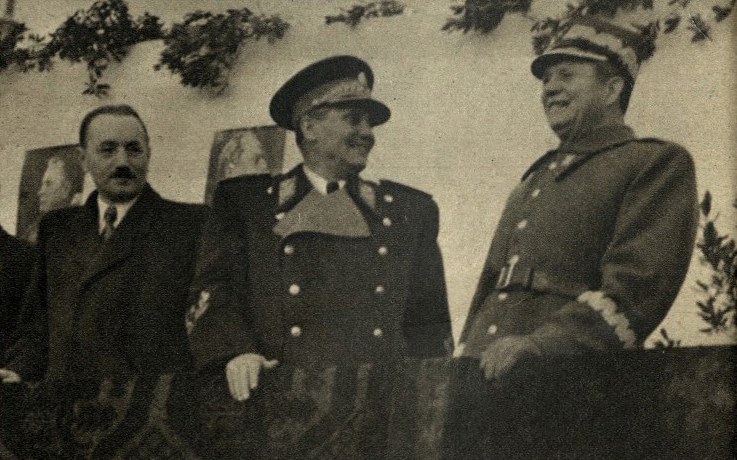
Żymierski (right) with Yugoslav leader Josip Broz Tito (centre) and Bolesław Bierut, chairman of the State National Council, in Rijeka in 1946

As commander-in-chief and minister, Żymierski shared responsibility for the use of the army against the population and for the persecution of soldiers of the anti-communist underground, according to the Encyklopedia wojskowa. Accounts of his own role differ. Wijaczka and the authors Paweł Dubiel and Józef Kozak state that he personally approved death sentences passed by military courts, including on soldiers of the Home Army and prewar officers. Pałka and Poksiński state that in most cases he commuted death sentences passed for political reasons to imprisonment. His subordinates later claimed that he had opposed the Sovietisation of the Polish Army.

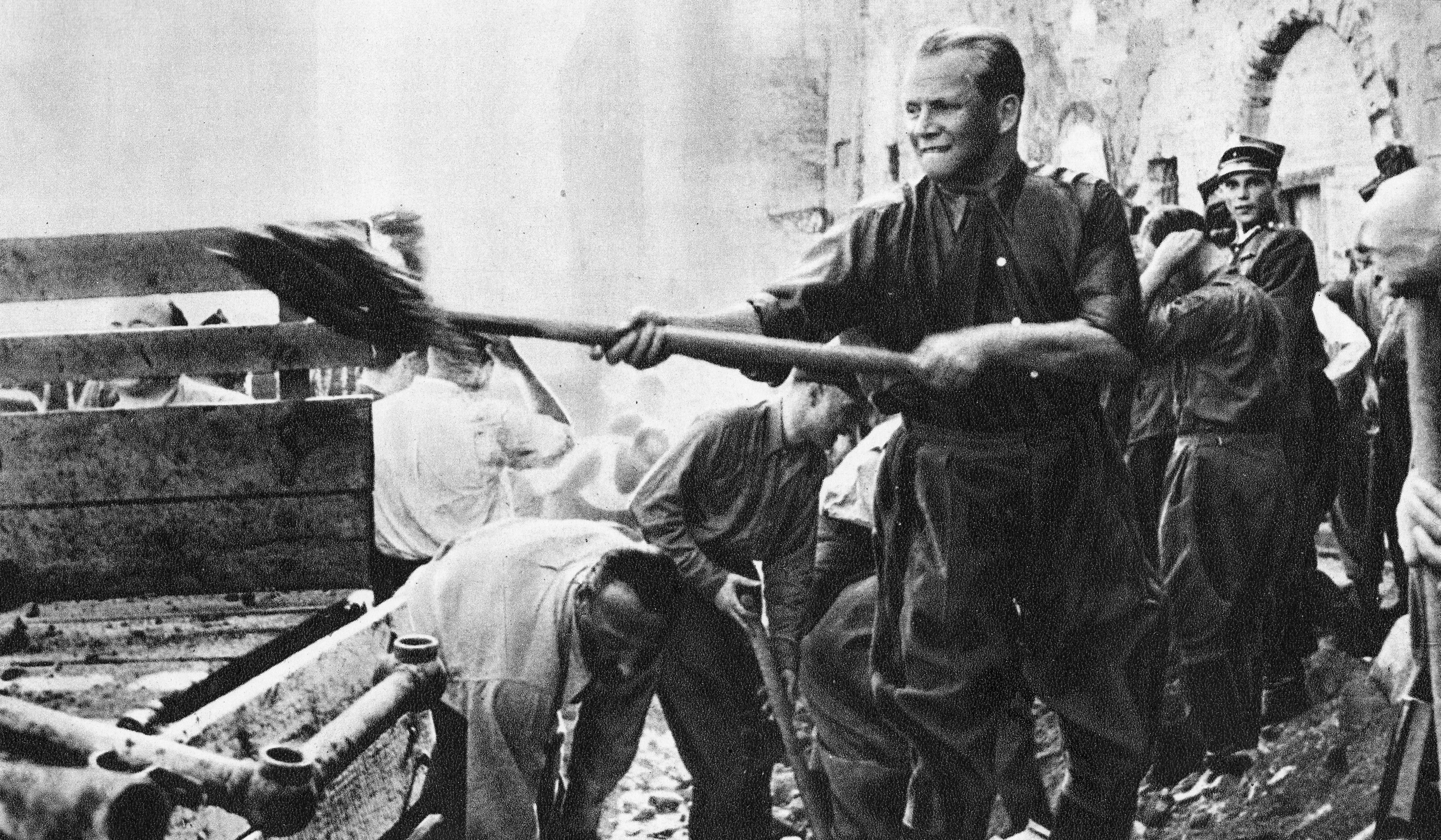
Żymierski helping to clear rubble in Warsaw

From 1946 to 1948, Żymierski headed the State Security Commission, which coordinated the security agencies. He was a member of the State National Council and of the Legislative Sejm from December 1943 to August 1952. Hult wrote that during his tenure a core of junior officers was drawn from the sons of workers and peasants who had returned from Soviet military schools. From May 1949, he sat on the military commission of the party Politburo that oversaw the army, according to Sławomir Cenckiewicz.

On 7 November 1949, the Polish government announced that Rokossovsky had been made Marshal of Poland and Minister of National Defence, and Żymierski was relieved of his duties and appointed to the Council of State, according to the Foreign Relations of the United States series. He remained a member of the Council of State until 20 November 1952.

== Arrest and rehabilitation ==
In May 1953, Żymierski was arrested by the Military Information service on a fabricated charge of spying for Western intelligence, and he responded that he had in fact worked for Soviet intelligence. His wife Zofia was also detained from 1953 to 1955. The investigation also examined his wartime contacts with the Gestapo, including testimony that he had offered to betray the communist leadership, which a witness largely retracted in February 1955. An investigator found the evidence of cooperation with the Gestapo inconclusive in April 1955, and the case was dropped in the summer of that year. Żymierski was released in 1955 and cleared of all charges about a year later. Wijaczka gives the date of his release and rehabilitation as 19 August 1955. A letter from Moscow confirmed his cooperation with the NKVD in 1932–1937 and 1942–1945.

== Later life ==
General Józef Baryła, head of the Main Political Directorate of the Polish Army, presents Żymierski with his published biography (1983)

From December 1956 to December 1967, Żymierski was deputy president of the National Bank of Poland and chairman of the supervisory board of Bank Handlowy. He was a long-standing member of the presidium of the main board of the ZBoWiD veterans' association. In 1974, he became honorary chairman of its main board, a post offered to him by Edward Gierek at the request of the Politburo. In May 1983, the congress of the Patriotic Movement for National Rebirth made him an honorary member of its national council.

His membership of the Polish United Workers' Party was made public only in 1981, when he was elected to its Central Committee at the party's extraordinary congress in July of that year, and he remained a member of the committee until July 1986. From August 1981, he also sat on the Central Committee's commission on law and legality. On 13 December 1981, he appeared on television to support the Military Council of National Salvation after the introduction of martial law in Poland. In December 1985, he was appointed to the team drafting the party's programme for its 10th Congress.

In 1983, the Military Historical Institute published an official biography of him, which Grzegorz Mazur describes as hagiographic and which appeared without the names of its authors.

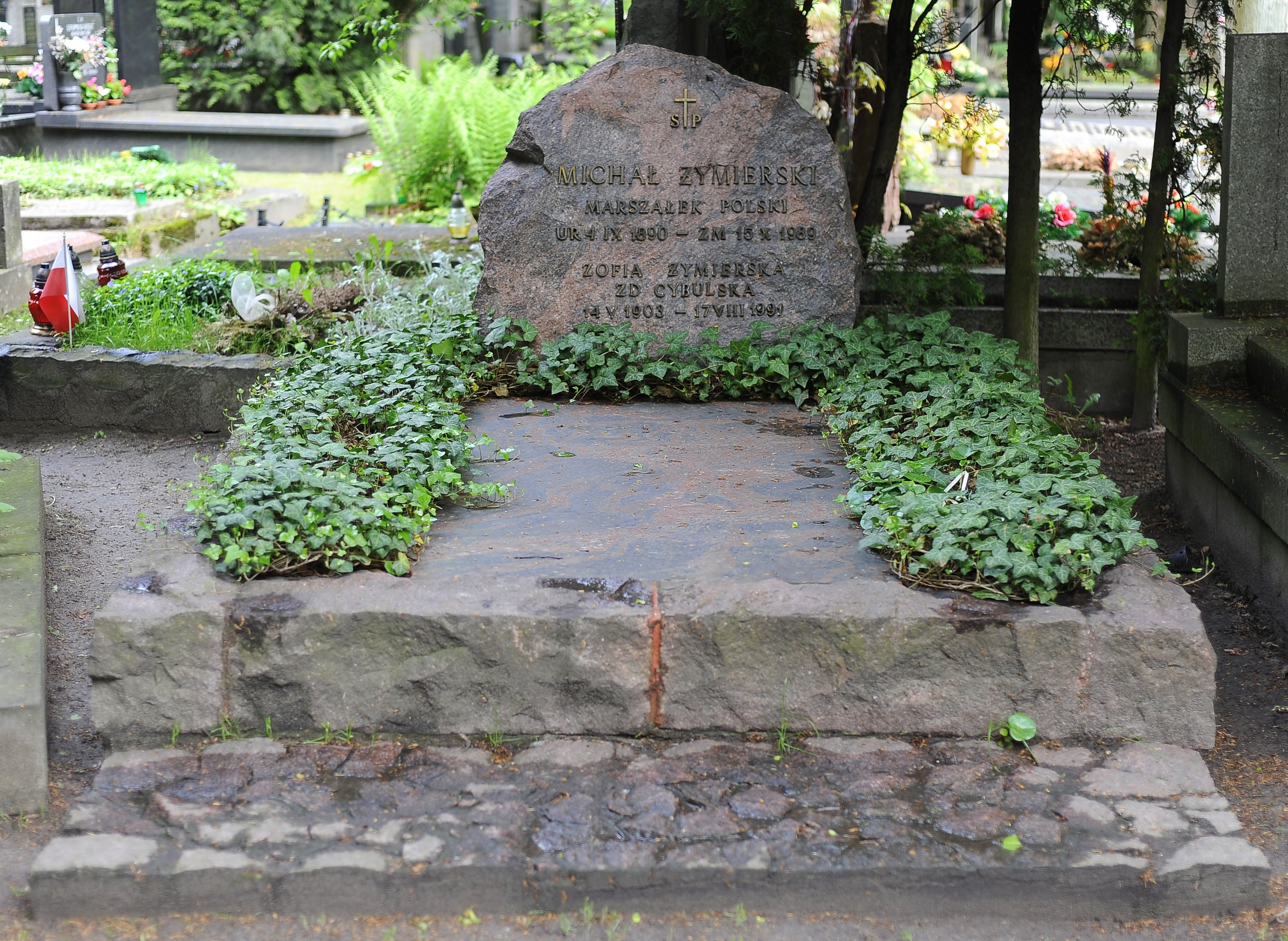
The grave of Żymierski and his wife Zofia at Powązki Military Cemetery

Żymierski died in Warsaw on 15 October 1989, at the age of 99, and his funeral was held five days later with full military honours. He was buried on 20 October 1989 in the Avenue of the Meritorious at the Powązki Military Cemetery. Unknown perpetrators twice poured red paint on his grave. The Institute of National Remembrance published a biography of him by Jarosław Pałka and Jerzy Poksiński in 2015. In his review, Eisler described Żymierski as a brave officer early in life who later became a hedonist, a criminal and a foreign agent.

== Personal life ==
Żymierski was married to Zofia Żymierska, née Cybulska (1903–1991). Their daughter Zofia (1934–2020) became a physician. His brothers Józef (1902–1982), a colonel in the Polish Army, Stanisław, a major in the Polish Armed Forces in the West, and Jan were also persecuted after the war.

== In popular culture ==
In 1947, the Polish Film Chronicle devoted a newsreel report to him under the title Nasz marszałek (Our Marshal). In the 1974 television play Sprawa Polska 1944, he was played by Zygmunt Kęstowicz.

== Honorary citizenship ==
Żymierski was made an honorary citizen of several Polish cities. The Toruń city council granted him the title on 29 November 1945, and he received the diploma on 16 May 1947. He also received the title from Kłodzko in 1945, Łęczyca on 30 March 1947, Włocławek on 25 September 1947, Bielsko-Biała in 1948, Chełm on 27 April 1982 and Sosnowiec in 1985.

After the fall of communism, several cities withdrew the title. Bielsko-Biała did so in 1991 and Kraków in the early 1990s. On 5 June 2006, the Włocławek council withdrew the title, citing among other things his responsibility for death sentences on soldiers of the Home Army, his conviction for embezzlement, his work as a Soviet agent and his proposal to hold arrested underground soldiers in isolation camps. Sosnowiec followed on 19 June 2008, Płock on 29 June 2011 and Chełm on 22 July 2019, the anniversary of the proclamation of the Polish Committee of National Liberation. On 19 March 2021, the council of Bydgoszcz also withdrew the title.

== Promotions ==
- Fähnrich – September 1912
- Hauptmann (captain) – 9 October 1914
- Major – by the summer of 1915
- Oberstleutnant (lieutenant colonel) – 1 November 1916
- Colonel – 1918, confirmed in the Polish Army with seniority from 1 June 1919
- Generał brygady (Brigadier general) – 1 December 1924, with seniority from 15 August 1924
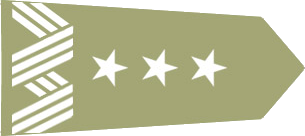
- Generał broni (Lieutenant general) – 21 July 1944
- Marszałek Polski (Marshal of Poland) – 3 May 1945

== Honours ==
According to a 2001 review in the Biuletyn Numizmatyczny, Żymierski was the only Pole to receive the first classes of all the orders awarded in communist Poland, the Soviet Order of Victory and the highest class of the American Legion of Merit, and he received 23 foreign military decorations in all. His prewar decorations were forfeited when he was expelled from the army in 1927.

=== Domestic ===
- Second Polish Republic
  - Silver Cross of the Virtuti Militari (1921)
  - Cross of Valour, four times (1921–1922)
  - Commander's Cross of the Order of Polonia Restituta (1925)
- Polish People's Republic
  - Grand Cross of the Virtuti Militari with Star (1945)
  - Grand Cross of the Order of Polonia Restituta (1946)
  - Order of the Builders of People's Poland (1970)
  - Order of the Cross of Grunwald, first class (1945)
  - Order of the Banner of Labour, first class (1964)
  - Partisan Cross (1946)
  - Silesian Uprising Cross (1947)
  - Medal for Warsaw 1939–1945 (1946)
  - Medal for Oder, Neisse and the Baltic
  - Medal of Victory and Freedom 1945
  - Medal of the 40th Anniversary of People's Poland (1984)
  - Medal of Rodło (1987)
  - Medal of Ludwik Waryński (1986)
  - Gold Medal for Merit to the League for National Defence (1979)
  - Gold Badge "Distinguished Activist of the League for National Defence" (1967)
  - Gold Medal "To Poles, Former Soldiers of the Red Army" (1983)
  - Commemorative Medal of the 40th Anniversary of the State National Council (1983)
  - Badge "For Merit to ZBoWiD" (1982)
  - Scouting Badge "For Merit" (1946)

=== Foreign ===
- Austria-Hungary
  - Order of the Iron Crown (1914)
- Belgium
  - Commander of the Order of the Crown
- People's Republic of Bulgaria
  - Order of 9 September 1944, first class with swords (1948)
- France
  - Knight of the Legion of Honour (1922)
  - Officer of the Legion of Honour (1925)
  - Grand Cross of the Legion of Honour (1967)
- Hungary
  - Grand Cross of the Order of Merit of the Hungarian Republic (1948)
- Kingdom of Italy
  - Grand Officer of the Order of the Crown of Italy (1926)
- Soviet Union
  - Order of Victory (No. 17, 1945)
  - Badge "25 Years of Victory in the Great Patriotic War 1941–1945" (1970)
- United States
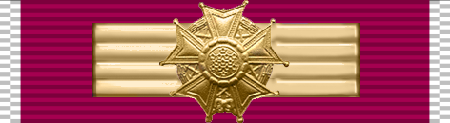
  - Chief Commander of the Legion of Merit (1945)
- Czechoslovakia
  - Grand Cross of the Order of the White Lion (1947)
  - Military Order of the White Lion "For Victory", first class (1947)
- Yugoslavia
  - Order of the People's Hero
  - Order of the Partisan Star, first class (1946)
