= Tadeusz Pietrzak =

Polish Brigadier general

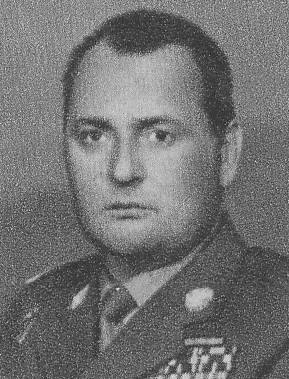
- Tadeusz Pietrzak in 1960s

Commanders-in-Chief of the Citizens' Militia
- In office July 1965 – August 1971
- Preceded by: Ryszard Dobieszak
- Succeeded by: Kazimierz Chojnacki

Deputy Minister of the Interior
- In office 15 May 1968 – 15 February 1978

Ambassador of the Polish People's Republic in Hungary
- In office 17 March 1978 – 20 May 1983
- Preceded by: Stefan Jędrychowski
- Succeeded by: Jerzy Zieliński

Personal details
- Born: 27 August 1926 Pacyna, Second Polish Republic
- Died: 10 March 2014 (aged 87) Warsaw, Poland
- Party: Polish United Workers' Party
- Other political affiliations: Polish Workers' Party
- Awards

Military service
- Allegiance: Polish People's Republic
- Branch/service: People's Guard; People's Army; Milicja Obywatelska; Polish People's Army
- Years of service: 1941–1978
- Rank: Major General
- Battles/wars: Second World War

Tadeusz Pietrzak (27 August 1926 – 10 March 2014) was a brigadier general of the Polish People's Army who served as commander of the Citizens' Militia, the principle police force in the Polish People's Republic and as Deputy Minister of Internal Affairs.

== Biography ==
He was born in the village of Pacyn as the son of Szymon and Józefa. During the Second World War he fought in the ranks of the People's Guard and then the People's Army. From 1945 he served in the Citizens' Militia. He took part in battles with National Armed Forces. In the years 1951-1953 he was deputy commander and from 1953 to 1954 provincial commander of the Citizens' Militia in Warsaw. In the years 1954-1956 he was provincial commander of the Militia in Poznań. After 1956 he served as deputy head of the Main Directorate of Information of the Polish Army (1956–1957), and then deputy head of the Internal Military Service (1957–1961). In the following years he was deputy head of the Operational Directorate of the General Staff of the Polish Army (1961–1963). In 1963 he became commander of the Internal Troops subordinate to the Ministry of Internal Affairs (Border Protection Forces and Internal Security Corps). He held this position until 1965, and in the meantime he graduated from the Academy of the General Staff of the Polish Army. In 1963 he was promoted to the rank of brigadier general and the nomination was presented to him in the Belweder Palace by the chairman of the State Council of the Polish People's Republic Aleksander Zawadzki.

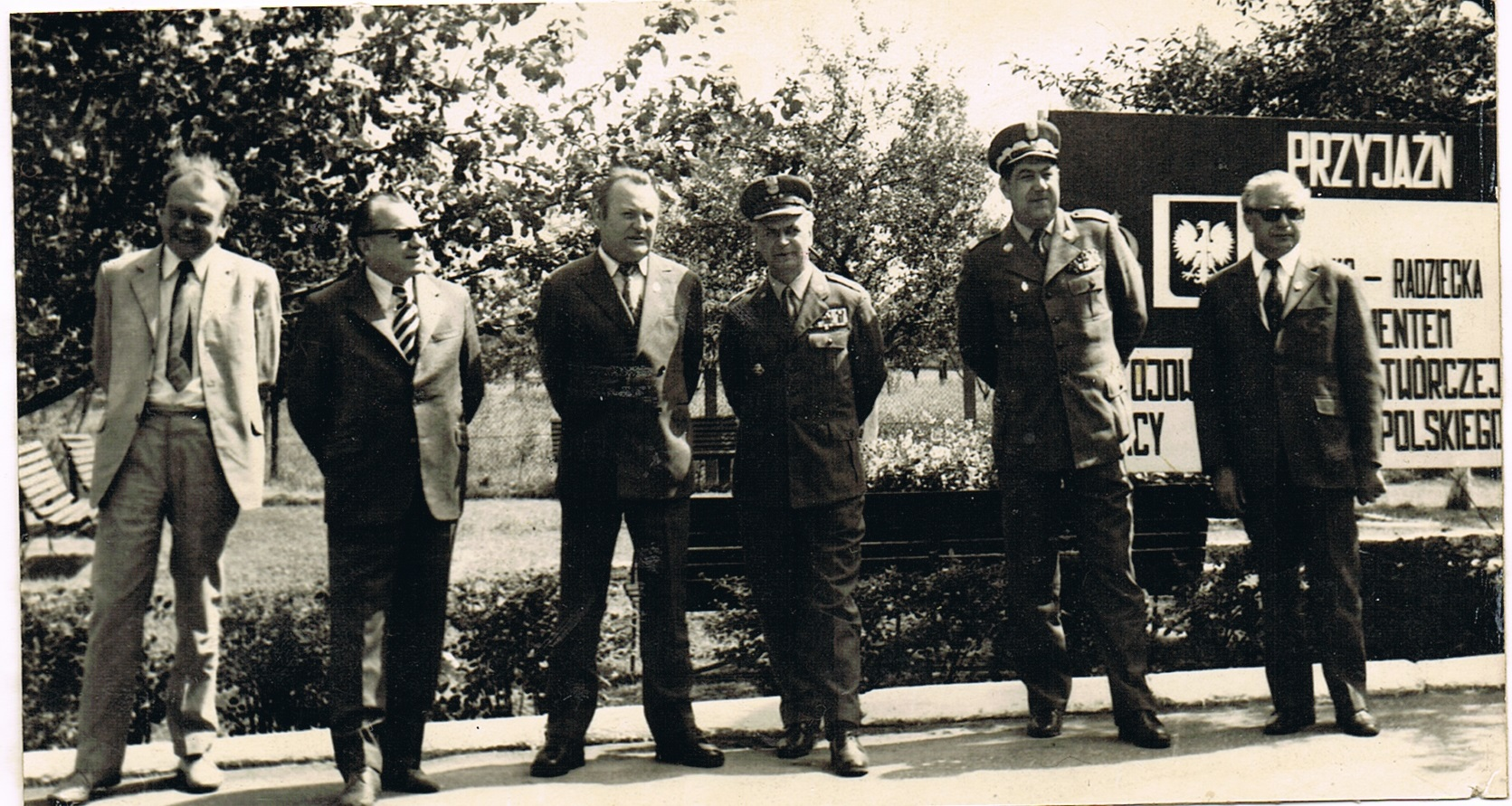
General Tadeusz Pietrzak visiting Zebrzydowice (third from the left).

From 20 July 1965 to August 1971 he was the commander-in-chief of the Citizens' Militia. From 15 May 1968 to 15 February 1978 he was the deputy minister of internal affairs of the Polish People's Republic. In December 1970 he participated in a conference in the office of the first secretary of the Central Committee of the Polish United Workers' Party Władysław Gomułka, during which a decision was made to use weapons against protesters on the Coast.

Member of the Polish Workers' Party (1942–1948) and the Polish United Workers' Party (1948–1990). In the years 1968–1975 he was a deputy member of the Central Committee of the Polish United Workers' Party, and in the years 1975–1980 a member of the Central Audit Commission of the Polish United Workers' Party.

In the years 1978–1983 he was the ambassador of the Polish People's Republic to Hungary. In the years 1969–1977 and in the years 1983–1990 he was the president of the Supreme Hunting Council of the Polish Hunting Association. He was also a member of the International Hunting Council, within which he was the vice-president of the Migratory Birds Commission. In September 1976 he received the title of honorary member of the Polish Hunting Association.

Doctor of Political Science at the Institute of Social and Economic Sciences of the Warsaw University of Technology and vice-chairman of the Scientific Council of the Institute of Crime Prevention. Since 1971 he was a member of the Citizens' Committee for the Reconstruction of the Royal Castle in Warsaw.

A long-time member of the Main Board, and in the years 1969–1979 a member of the Presidium of the Main Board of the Society of Fighters for Freedom and Democracy. He was also a long-time chairman of the Historical Commission of the Youth Movement at the Main Board of the Polish Socialist Youth Union.

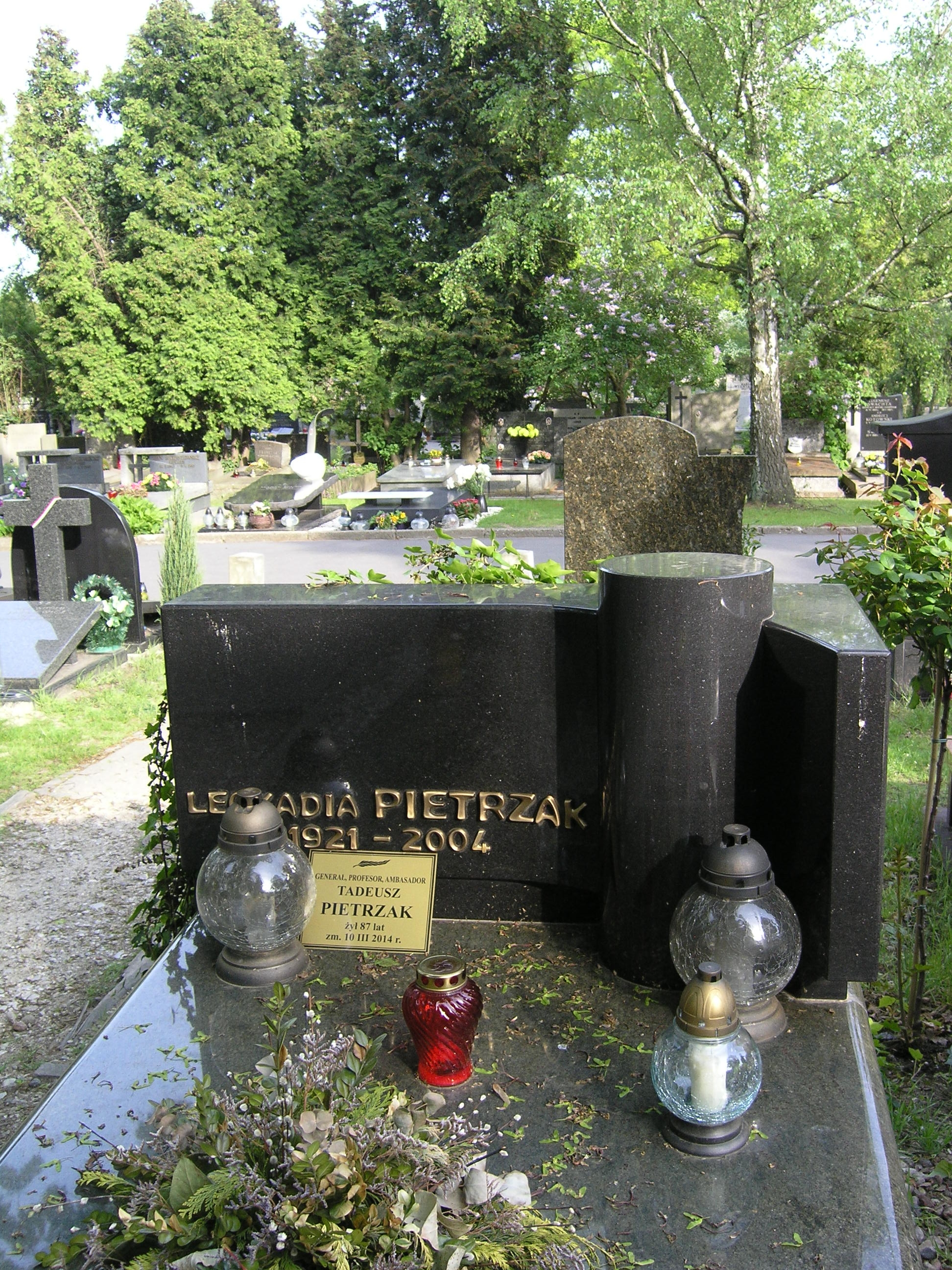
Grave of Tadeusz Pietrzak grave at the Powązki Military Cemetery.

He died on 10 March 2014 and was buried at the Powązki Military Cemetery, without a military honorary escort, although he was entitled to one as a former general. The Ministry of National Defence refused to provide a military guard of honour at his funeral due to protests from veterans' organisations, which argued that as a participant in the fights against the anti-communist resistance and one of those responsible for the massacre of workers on the coast in 1970, he should not be entitled to such a guard.

== Awards and decorations ==
- Order of the Banner of Labour, 1st Class (1964)
- Order of the Banner of Labour, 2nd Class
- Order of the Cross of Grunwald, 3rd Class
- Commander's Cross of the Order of Polonia Restituta
- Knight's Cross of the Order of Polonia Restituta
- Silver Cross of Virtuti Militari
- Cross of Valour (twice)
- Medal of the 30th Anniversary of People's Poland
- Medal of the 40th Anniversary of People's Poland
- Gold Medal of the Armed Forces in the Service of the Fatherland
- Silver Medal of the Armed Forces in the Service of the Fatherland
- Bronze Medal of the Armed Forces in the Service of the Fatherland
- Medal of the 10th Anniversary of People's Poland
- Gold Medal of Merit for National Defence
- Silver Medal of Merit for National Defence
- Bronze Medal of Merit for National Defence
- Medal of Ludwik Waryński (1986)
- Order of the Red Banner

== Bibliography ==
- H. P. Kosk: Generalicja Polska. T. II. Pruszków: Oficyna Wydawnicza „Ajaks”, 2010, s. 747. (In Polish).
- Zasłużeni dla polskiego łowiectwa. pod redakcją Jerzego Krupki. Agencja Wydawnicza „Agar”, 2003. (In Polish).
- Janusz Królikowski: Generałowie i admirałowie Wojska Polskiego 1943–1990. T. III: M-S. Toruń: 2010, s. 174–176. (In Polish).
- Lech Kowalski, Krótsze ramię Moskwy. Historia kontrwywiadu wojskowego PRL, Wydawnictwo Fronda, 2017 (In Polish)
