= Franciszek Jóźwiak =

Polish politician and military commander

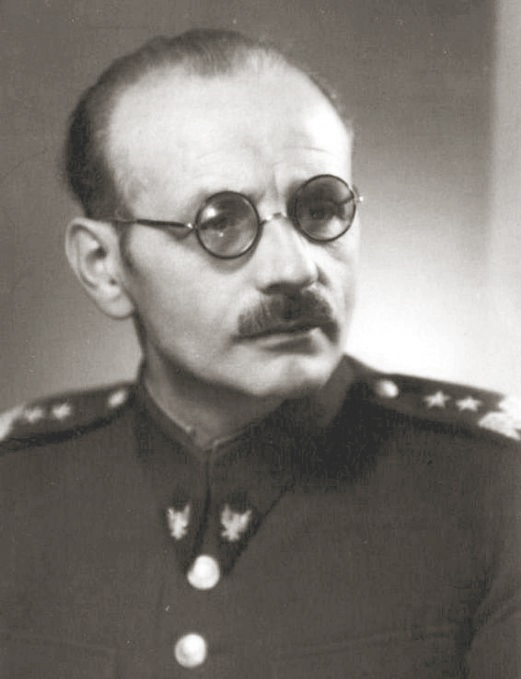

Deputy Prime Minister of the Republic of Poland
- In office 16 April 1955 – 16 October 1956
- Prime Minister: Bolesław Bierut

Minister of State Control
- In office 12 December 1952 – 16 April 1955
- Preceded by: Position established after the liquidation of the Supreme Audit Office
- Succeeded by: Roman Zambrowski

Member of the Polish State Council
- In office 9 March 1949 – 20 November 1952

Personal details
- Born: 20 October 1895 Huta, Congress Poland
- Died: 23 October 1966 (aged 71) Warsaw, Polish People's Republic
- Party: Communist Party of Poland; Polish Workers' Party; Polish United Workers' Party
- Awards: Order of the Builders of People's Poland; Order of the Banner of Labour; Order of Polonia Restituta; Partisan Cross

Military service
- Branch/service: Gwardia Ludowa; Armia Ludowa; Polish People's Army; Milicja Obywatelska
- Battles/wars: World War I Polish-Soviet War; World War II

Franciszek Jóźwiak (20 October 1895 – 23 October 1966) was a Polish communist politician and military commander.

Jóźwiak was active in the communist movement of the Second Polish Republic and was often imprisoned for his ties to the Soviet Union. Jóźwiak fled to Soviet-occupied Poland in 1939, joining the Polish Workers' Party, becoming the commander of its paramilitary wings the Gwardia Ludowa and the Armia Ludowa, and participating in the Soviet partisans in Poland. Jóźwiak held a number of high offices in the early Polish People's Republic, including chief of the Citizen's Militia, deputy chairman of the Council of Ministers, and member of the Politburo of the Polish United Workers' Party. Jóźwiak was removed from government after the Polish October in 1956.

== Early life and military service ==
Franciszek Jóźwiak was born on 20 October 1895 in Huta, Congress Poland into a Polish peasant family. He was a member of the Polish Military Organisation and joined the Polish Socialist Party in 1912. Following the outbreak of World War I in 1914, Jóźwiak was drafted into the Imperial Russian Army, but soon defected to Austria-Hungary and joined the Polish Legions. In July 1917, he participated in the Oath crisis led by Józef Piłsudski and refused to take the oath to the Kaiser of the German Empire and the Central Powers. He was interned at a camp in Szczypiorno until the end of the war. Jóźwiak joined the Polish Army of the newly independent Second Republic of Poland and fought in the Polish–Soviet War of 1920, but was later demobilised as a non-commissioned officer.

== Political career ==
=== Early communist activities ===
Jóźwiak joined the Polish Communist Workers' Party (KPP) in 1921. During the Polish-Soviet War, the Communist Party supported the Soviet Union and many of its members were arrested. A year later, he was detained for the first time and arrested for 18 months in Lublin. In December 1924, he was arrested a second time. In December 1926, he was released from prison and managed the work of district committees of the KPP in Lublin, Radom-Kielce and Poznan-Pomerania. From 1928 to 1929, Jóźwiak underwent military training in the Soviet Union, which was illegal in Poland. In 1931, he became the head of the Military Department of the Central Committee of the KPP, dealing with intelligence for the Soviets and communist propaganda in the Polish Army. In April, he was arrested for the third time and sentenced to six years' imprisonment. In January 1937, he was imprisoned in Bereza Kartuska. In the same year, he was sentenced to ten years' imprisonment. Until 1939, he was serving a sentence in a prison in Tarnów.

=== World War II and resistance ===
Jóźwiak was released from prison after Germany invaded Poland in September 1939 and soon relocated to Soviet occupation zone, becoming a Soviet citizen and fighting alongside Soviet partisans. In May 1941, he became a member of the All-Union Communist Party (Bolsheviks). In 1942, Jóźwiak made his way into Poland and became a member of the leadership of the Polish Workers' Party (PPR), the main communist party in Poland sponsored by the Soviet Union. He was the secretary of the Central Committee of the PPR and supervised the power structures in the party. From August 1942, he was the chief of staff of the Gwardia Ludowa, the paramilitary wing of the PPR, and from January 1944 served as the chief of staff of the Armia Ludowa. Under the pseudonym "Witold" he played a prominent role in the communist Polish resistance.

=== Polish People's Republic ===
Jóźwiak's position at the end of the war allowed him to hold a number of prominent offices in the early Polish People's Republic. From 1944 to 1949, Jóźwiak was the first chief commander of the Citizens' Militia (MO), the communist civilian police force, and from March 1945 also served as the deputy Minister of Public Security. In April 1946, he was promoted to the rank of major general. He was President of the Supreme Audit Office, and after its liquidation from 1952 to 1955, became the Minister of State Control. At the same time, from 1949 to 1952, he was a member of the State Council. From 1955 to 1956, he was deputy Prime Minister of Poland. From 1948 to 1956, he was a member of the Politburo of the Central Committee of the Polish United Workers' Party (PZPR) and chairman of the Central Party Control Commission. He was a member of the National Council, the Legislative Sejm, and the Sejm of the People's Republic of Poland of the first term. From 1945 to 1948, he was the president of the Main Board of the Union of Participants in the Armed Struggle for Freedom and Democracy. From 1948 to 1949, he was the president of the Main Board of the Union of Fighters against Fascism and the Hitlerite Invaders for Independence and Democracy, and until 1956 the Union of Fighters for Freedom and Democracy. In November 1949, he became a member of the National Committee for the Celebration of the 70th anniversary of the birth of Joseph Stalin.

== Later career and fall from power ==
Jóźwiak's political position was undermined by the Polish October events that occurred in October 1956. Mass protests against Stalinism and Soviet influence in Poland had threatened communist rule and pressured the PZPR for anti-Stalinist reforms. Jóźwiak had strong ties to the Soviets and belonged to the Stalinist faction of the PZPR. On 24 October, the day of Władysław Gomułka's speech with the so called "thaw" program of liberalisation, he was removed from the post of deputy chairman of the government and removed from the Politburo of the PZPR. He headed a group of Natolinians that protested against the liberalisation of the regime. In the last decade of his life, Jóźwiak did not hold government posts and did not enjoy the same influence in the party leadership.

Jóźwiak died on 23 October 1966, three days after his 71st birthday. He is buried at the Powązki Military Cemetery in Warsaw.

== Personal life ==
Jóźwiak was married twice: he was married to Helena Wolińska, a military prosecutor in political trials, from 1942 until she left him during the Polish October (de-Stalinisation period) and returned to her first husband Włodzimierz Brus in 1956. His brother, Józef Jóźwiak, was a soldier of the 2nd Polish Corps who fought at the Battle of Monte Cassino.

== Awards and decorations ==
- Order of the Builders of People's Poland
- Order of the Cross of Grunwald, 1st Class
- Order of the Banner of Labour, 1st Class
- Commander's Cross with Star of Order of Polonia Restituta
- Commander's Cross of Order of Polonia Restituta
- Partisan Cross
- Medal for Warsaw 1939–1945
- Commander's Cross with Star of Hungarian Order of Merit (Hungary)
- Gold Star of Military Order of the White Lion, 1st Class (Czechoslovak Socialist Republic)
