= Józef Beim =

Polish Major general of the Milicja Obywatelska

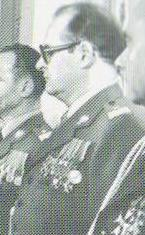

Commanders-in-Chief of the Citizens' Militia
- In office April 1987 – October 1981
- Preceded by: Stanisław Zaczkowski
- Succeeded by: Zenon Trzciński

Personal details
- Born: 13 April 1937 Klaniny, Second Polish Republic
- Died: 30 April 1987 (aged 50) Warsaw, Polish People's Republic
- Party: Polish United Workers' Party
- Awards

Military service
- Allegiance: Polish People's Republic
- Branch/service: Milicja Obywatelska
- Years of service: 1956–1987
- Rank: Major General

Józef Beim (April 13, 1937 - April 30, 1987) was a Polish major general of the Milicja Obywatelska and a PhD in economics at the Kraków University of Economics.

== Biography ==
He was born in the village of Klaniny as the son of Edmund and Eleonora. From 1956 he was an officer of the Citizens' Militia. In the years 1956-1957 he studied at the Officers' School of the Citizens' Militia in Szczytno. From 1957 he was an officer of the Criminal Department of the Provincial Headquarters of the Citizens' Militia in Gdańsk. From 1960 he was deputy district commander in Puck, from 1962 district commander of the MO in Tczew, from 1966 city and district commander in Elbląg. From 1970 city commander in Gdynia, from 1973 city commander in Kraków, and from 1975 deputy provincial commander in Kraków. From 1978 he was deputy commander-in-chief, and from October 1981 he was commander-in-chief of the Citizens' Militia. Graduate of the Faculty of Industrial Economics at the University of Gdańsk. Brigadier general of the MO since 1979, and Major general of the MO since 1984. He received both nominations in the Belweder Palace from the hands of the chairman of the Council of State of the Polish People's Republic, Henryk Jabłoński.

Member of the Polish United Workers' Party since 1958. In the years 1973–1975 member of the Committee for Public Security and Order of the Provincial Committee of the Polish United Workers' Party in Kraków. At the 10th Congress of the Polish United Workers' Party in 1986 elected to the Central Control and Audit Commission of the Polish United Workers' Party.

He died on 30 April 1987 and was buried on 4 May 1987 at the Powązki Military Cemetery in Warsaw.

== Awards and decorations ==
- Order of the Banner of Labour, 2nd Class (1986)
- Commander's Cross of the Order of Polonia Restituta (1979)
- Knight's cross of the Order of Polonia Restituta (1974)
- Gold Cross of Merit (1969)
- Medal "For Strengthening of Brotherhood in Arms" (USSR, 1983)

== Bibliography ==
- H.P. Kosk: Generalicja Polska, tom I, Oficyna Wydawnicza „Ajaks” Pruszków 1999 (In Polish)
- Leksykon Historii Polski, Wydawnictwo Wiedza Powszechna Warszawa 1996 (In Polish)
- T. Mołdawa: Ludzie władzy 1944–1991, Wydawnictwo Naukowe PWN Warszawa 1991 (In Polish)
- Catalogue of IPN
- J. Stroynowski (red.): Who is who in the Socialist countries of Europe : a biographical encyclopedia of more than 12,600 leading personalities in Albania, Bulgaria, Czechoslovakia, German Democratic Republic, Hungary, Poland, Romania, Yugoslavia 1989, tom 3, K.G. Saur Pub. Munich 1989
- P. Brzeziński, R. Chrzanowski, A. Nadarzyńska-Piszczewiat: Zbrodnia bez kary. Grudzień 1970 w Gdyni, Oficyna Verbi Causa Gdynia 2010 (In Polish)
