= Marsz Gwardii Ludowej =

"Marsz Gwardii Ludowej" ("March of the People's Guard"), also known as "Pieśń Partyzantów" ("Partisans' Song") and "My ze spalonych wsi" ("We're From the Burned Down Villages"), is a Polish partisan song, anthem of GL and AL. The song was written by Wanda Zieleńczyk, a Polish communist poet and member of GL, in 1942.

== Lyrics ==
My ze spalonych wsi,
My z głodujących miast.
Za głód, za krew, za lata łez,
Już zemsty nadszedł czas!

Więc zarepetuj broń
I w serce wroga mierz!
Dudni już krok, milionów krok,
Brzmi partyzancki śpiew.

Więc naprzód, Gwardio, marsz!
Świat płonie wokół nas.
I zadrży wróg, i zginie wróg
Z ręki ludowych mas.

We, from burned-down villages,
We, from starving cities.
For hunger, for blood, for years of tears,
The time of vengeance has come!

So chamber your weapon,
And aim at the enemy's heart!
Footsteps are thundering, the footsteps of millions,
The partisan song resounds.

So forward, Guard, march!
The world is burning all around us.
And the foe shall tremble, and the foe shall perish
By the hand of the people’s masses.

== See also ==
- Role of music in World War II
- Polish underground culture during World War II
