= Milicja Obywatelska =

National police agency of the Polish People's Republic

Citizens' Militia Milicja Obywatelska
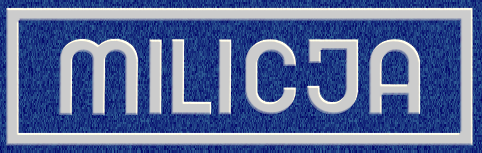
- Militia patch

- Collar patch known as palemka
- Common name: Milicja
- Abbreviation: MO

Agency overview
- Formed: 7 October 1944
- Preceding agency: State Police
- Dissolved: 10 May 1990
- Superseding agency: Police
- Employees: 80,000 (1980s)

Jurisdictional structure
- National agency: Polish People's Republic
- Operations jurisdiction: Polish People's Republic
- General nature: Civilian police

Operational structure
- Headquarters: Warsaw
- Agency executive: Franciszek Jóźwiak, First Director
- Parent agency: Ministry of Public Security; Ministry of Internal Affairs
- Child agency: ZOMO; ORMO

The Milicja Obywatelska (Polish pronunciation: [miˈlit͡sja ɔbɨvaˈtɛlska]; MO), known as the Citizens' Militia in English, was the national police organization of the Polish People's Republic.

The MO was established on 7 October 1944 by the Polish Committee of National Liberation under Chief Commander Franciszek Jóźwiak to police Red Army controlled areas of Poland during World War II. It became the official police force with the founding of the Polish People's Republic in 1947, effectively replacing the pre-war State Police as the main uniformed civilian police of Poland during the communist era. The MO was headquartered in Warsaw while training for the force was conducted in the town of Legionowo.

The MO was supported by two paramilitary formations: the elite Motorized Reserves of the Citizens' Militia (ZOMO) and the reservist Volunteer Reserve of the Citizens' Militia (ORMO). In most cases it represented a state-controlled force used to exert political repression, especially with its elite ZOMO squads. The MO continued to exist after the fall of communism in Poland in 1989 until it was transformed back into Policja on 10 May 1990.

== History ==
The Citizens' Militia (MO) was created on the basis of provisions of the July Manifesto of the Soviet-backed Polish National Liberation Committee (PKWN), State National Council. It was formally established by decree on 7 October 1944 during the later stages of the Eastern Front of World War II. Milicja had been adapted from the cognate term militsiya used in the Soviet Union, itself derived from militia with its etymology from the concept of a military force composed of ordinary citizens.

The MO was used to establish the authority of the PKWN in areas of Poland that came under control of the Red Army as it pushed through the country into Nazi Germany. The first generation officers and agents were drawn from the following groups and sectors of society:

- Servicemen from the Polish People's Army on secondment.
- Partisans from the People's Army militia.
- Civilians with far-left party affiliation: the Polish Workers' Party, the Polish People's Party and the Polish Socialist Party.

Poland came under the domination of the Soviet Union at the end of World War II and, following the rigged 1947 Polish parliamentary election, the PKWN-derived Provisional Government of National Unity was able to legitimise itself enough to supplant the London-based Polish government-in-exile recognized by the Western allies. The MO effectively became the official civilian police force of Poland replacing the Policja. Former members of the anti-communist underground such as the Home Army, who tried to ensure an influence on everyday life, joined the new force, to the point that the entire outposts were Home Army members. The MO was supplemented by about a thousand former policemen employed in 1945, mainly in positions requiring special qualifications.

In 1948, Poland's strengthened turn toward Stalinism brought the beginning of formalised totalitarian rule, "in which one Party ruled autonomously over all sections of society". Officers of the MO took the same solemn oath as the officers of the Security Service. Its main fragment read as follows:

I solemnly vow ...- to faithfully serve the Fatherland, the Party and People's Authority and to protect the law, order and public safety.

— Sławomir Cenckiewicz, Through the eyes of the security. Sketches and materials from the history of the security apparatus of the People's Republic of Poland, Kraków 2006, p. 509

The first chief commander of MO was Franciszek Jóźwiak. The militia was then subordinated to Ministry of Public Security, and from 1955 to Ministry of Internal Affairs. From March 1946 to the end of the 1940s, local MO units with units of the Polish People's Army, Internal Security Corps, Ministry of Public Security and Border Protection were subordinated to provincial security committees subordinate to State Security Commission. In the years 1944–1948, the Citizens' Militia was used to fight "cursed soldiers", as well as servicemen of the Ukrainian Insurgent Army and German Werwolf elements.

=== The decrees and the first organizational structure ===
When on July 27, 1944, the Civic Militia was established by one of the two decrees of the Polish Committee of National Liberation (PKWN's decree was approved on August 15, 1944, by the National National Council), in Rzeczpospolita - "press organ of the Polish Committee of National Liberation" - August 16, 1944 was provided with:

We are creating the Citizens' Militia. The name is not accidental. The militia must be truly a civic militia and all its efforts to ensure public safety will find support from the public.

Given the fact that the first generation officers and men of the MO were drawn partly from the armed force the MO sported military ranks, a tradition shared with the other Warsaw Pact police forces.

=== Rise of terrorism ===
Due to increasing terrorist threats, the MO created the Wydział Zabezpieczenia (Security Department) (Note: Leigh Neville identified the unit as the Faculty of Security.) on February 22, 1976. This consisted of 47 officers assigned to five sections.

In 1982, the WZ had a unit that is on standby to conduct anti-hijacking operations and provide security on LOT Polish Airlines airplanes. The WZ would later be known as the Biuro Operacji Antyterrorystycznych (BOA) after being reorganized.

== Directors ==
Portrait	Rank	Name	Term
		Franciszek Jóźwiak	October 1944 - March 1949
		Józef Konarzewski	March 1949 - December 1953
		Stanisław Wolański	December 1953 - June 1956
		Ryszard Dobieszak	June 1956 - July 1965
		Tadeusz Pietrzak	July 1965 - August 1971
		Kazimierz Chojnacki	September 1971 - May 1973
		Marian Janicki	May 1973 - February 1978
		Stanisław Zaczkowski	February 1978 - October 1981
		Józef Beim	October 1981 - April 1987
		Zenon Trzciński	May 1987 - May 1990

== Organisation ==
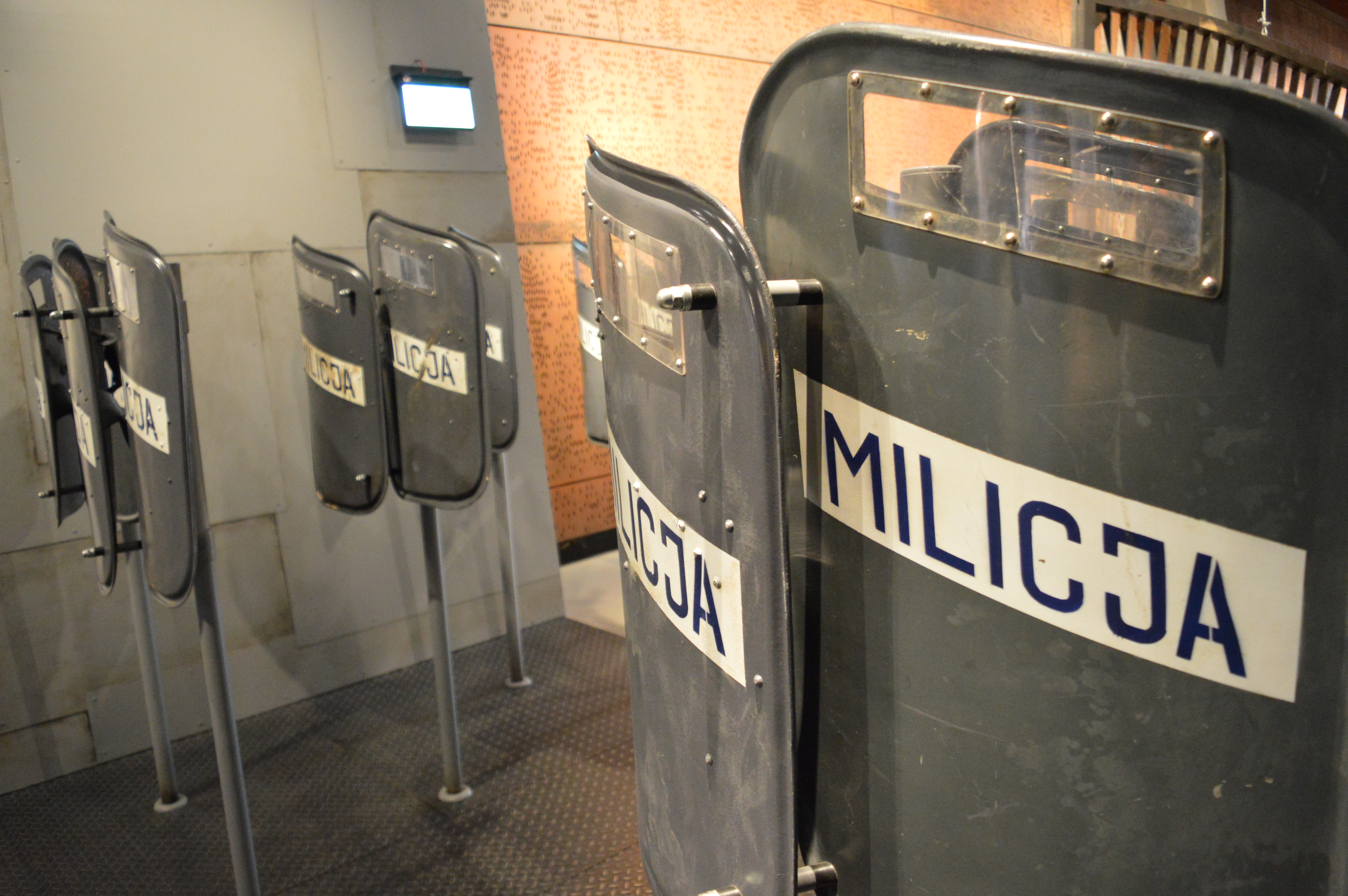
Militia shields from 1980s, display at the European Solidarity Centre

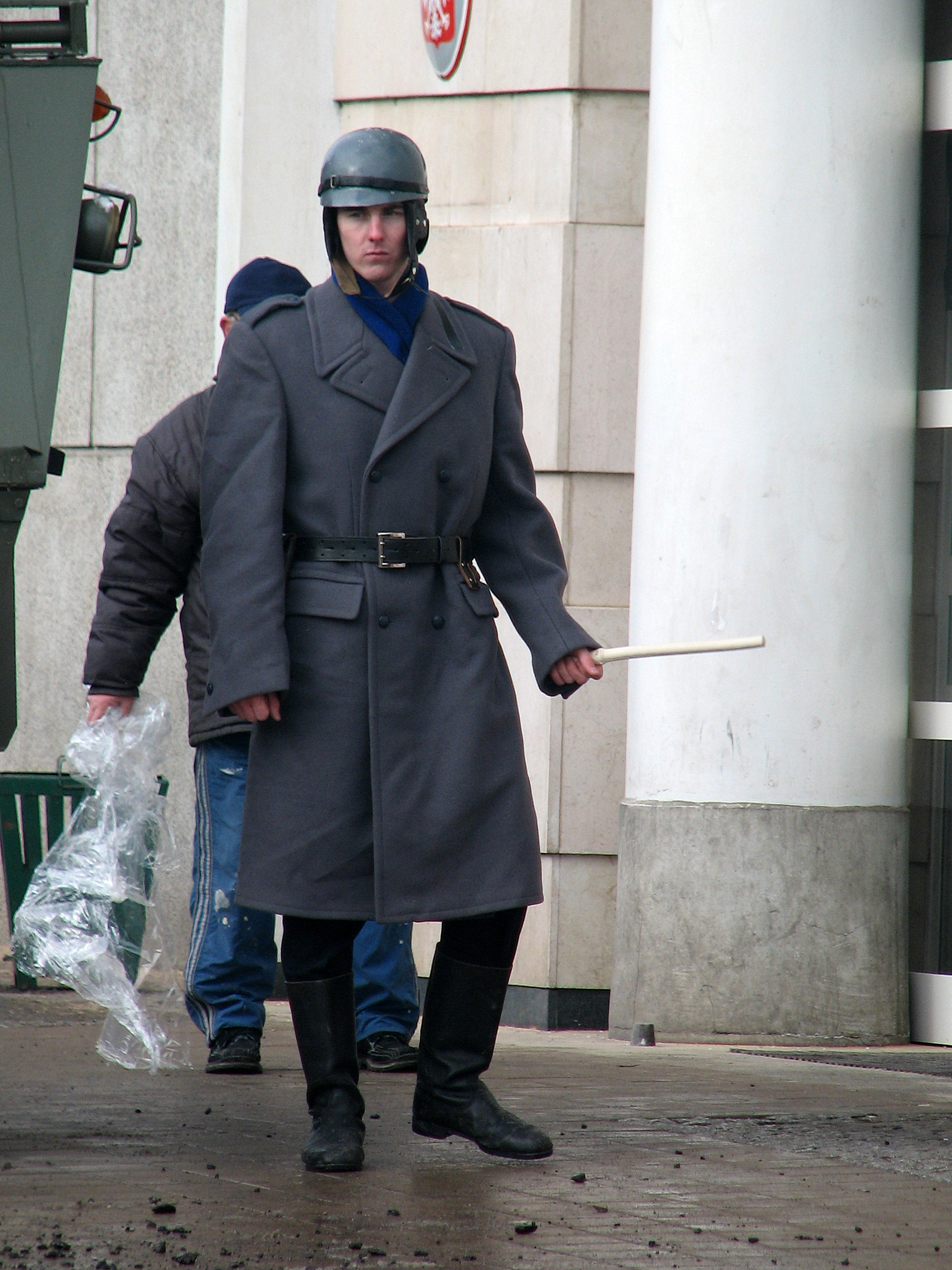
An actor dressed in a militiaman's uniform

When the MO was first organized in 1945, it comprised the following:

- Main Office (Kancelaria główna)
- Political and Educational Board (Zarząd polityczno-wychowawczy)
- Investigation Service Board (Oddział służby śledczej)
- External Service Branch (Oddział służby zewnętrznej)
- Operational Battalion (Battalion operacyjny)
- Personnel Department (Wydział personalny)
- Finance and Economic Department (Wydział Finansowy i gospodarczy)

Until 1950, Poland was divided to 16 provinces. It was only from 1950 to 1975 when the country was divided to 17 provinces and five cities with voivodeship rights.

The MO had 20 municipal headquarters.

The Citizens' Militia was divided into a Public Order Department, Traffic Militia (Highway patrol), Criminal Investigations (Major crimes, forensics), Investigations Militia and an Infrastructure Security Section (Security of government buildings, airports, installations).

The ZOMO motorized riot troops, which played the most visible role in quelling demonstrations in 1980 and 1981, were reduced in size somewhat by the early 1990s and renamed Preventive Units of the Citizens' Militia (Oddziały Prewencji Milicji Obywatelskiej—OPMO). OPMO forces are restricted to roles such as crowd control at sporting events, ensuring safety in natural disasters, and assisting the regular police. In theory, higher government authority would be required for large OPMO contingents to be used.

From the 1960s through the 1980s, ORMO forces, which at one time numbered as many as 600,000 civilian volunteers, were used to augment regular police personnel at key trouble spots. In the early 1980s, ORMO harassed Solidarity members and prevented independent groups from organizing. Largely staffed by industrial workers who gained substantial privileges by monitoring their peers in the workplace, ORMO was the object of extreme resentment throughout the 1980s. Kiszczak attempted to promote ORMO as a valuable auxiliary police force, but the organization was abolished by the Sejm in 1990.

== Ranks and uniform ==
As a general rule, the MO wore grey and sky blue uniforms. The full dress variant of this was worn with the peaked cap, service dress was the same but the riot police wore combat helmets.

Rank Category	Commissioned Officers (1945–1957)	Commissioned Officers (1958–1990 with changes made in 1975 and 1986)	English translation (military/police rank)
General officers	No equivalent	General armii	General; Director General
General officers	No equivalent	General broni	Lieutenant General; Commissioner General
General officers	No equivalent	Generał dywizji	Major General; Inspector General
General officers	Generał brygady MO (formerly General MO)	Generał brygady MO	Police Brigadier; Commissioner
Field grade officers	Pułkownik	Pułkownik	Police Colonel; Commander; Detective Commander
Field grade officers	Podpułkownik	Podpułkownik	Police Lieutenant Colonel; Chief Superintendent; Detective Chief Superintendent
Field grade officers	Major	Major	Police Major; Superintendent; Detective Superintendent
Subaltern grade officers	Kapitan	Kapitan	Police Captain; Chief Inspector; Detective Chief Inspector
Subaltern grade officers	Porucznik	Porucznik	Police Lieutenant; Senior Inspector; Detective Senior Inspector
Subaltern grade officers	Podporucznik	Podporucznik	Police Second Lieutenant; Inspector; Detective Inspector
Subaltern grade officers	Chorąży (abolished as officer rank 1956–57)	No equivalent	Police Ensign; Divisional Inspector; Detective Divisional Inspector

Rank Category	Non-Commissioned Officers and basic agents	English translation (military/police rank)
Station inspectors and senior NCOs (created 1974–75)	Starszy chorąży sztabowy	Senior Station Inspector; Chief Warrant Officer(ZOMO)
Station inspectors and senior NCOs (created 1974–75)	Chorąży sztabowy	Station Inspector; Senior Warrant Officer(ZOMO)
Station inspectors and senior NCOs (created 1974–75)	Starszy chorąży	Sub-inspector first class Master Warrant Officer(ZOMO)
Station inspectors and senior NCOs (created 1974–75)	Chorąży	Sub-inspector; First Warrant Officer(ZOMO)
Station inspectors and senior NCOs (created 1974–75)	Młodszy chorąży	Assistant sub-inspector Second Warrant Officer(ZOMO)
Police NCOs	Starszy sierżant sztabowy	Sergeant Major
Police NCOs	Sierżant sztabowy	Head Constable; Master Sergeant (ZOMO)
Police NCOs	Starszy sierżant	Sergeant First Class
Police NCOs	Sierżant	Staff Sergeant
Police NCOs	Plutonowy	Sergeant
Police NCOs	Starszy kapral	Lance Corporal
Police NCOs	Kapral	Corporal
Constables	Starszy szeregowy	Senior Constable; Private First Class (ZOMO)
Constables	Szeregowy	Constable; Private (ZOMO)

== Transportation ==
The most common types were:

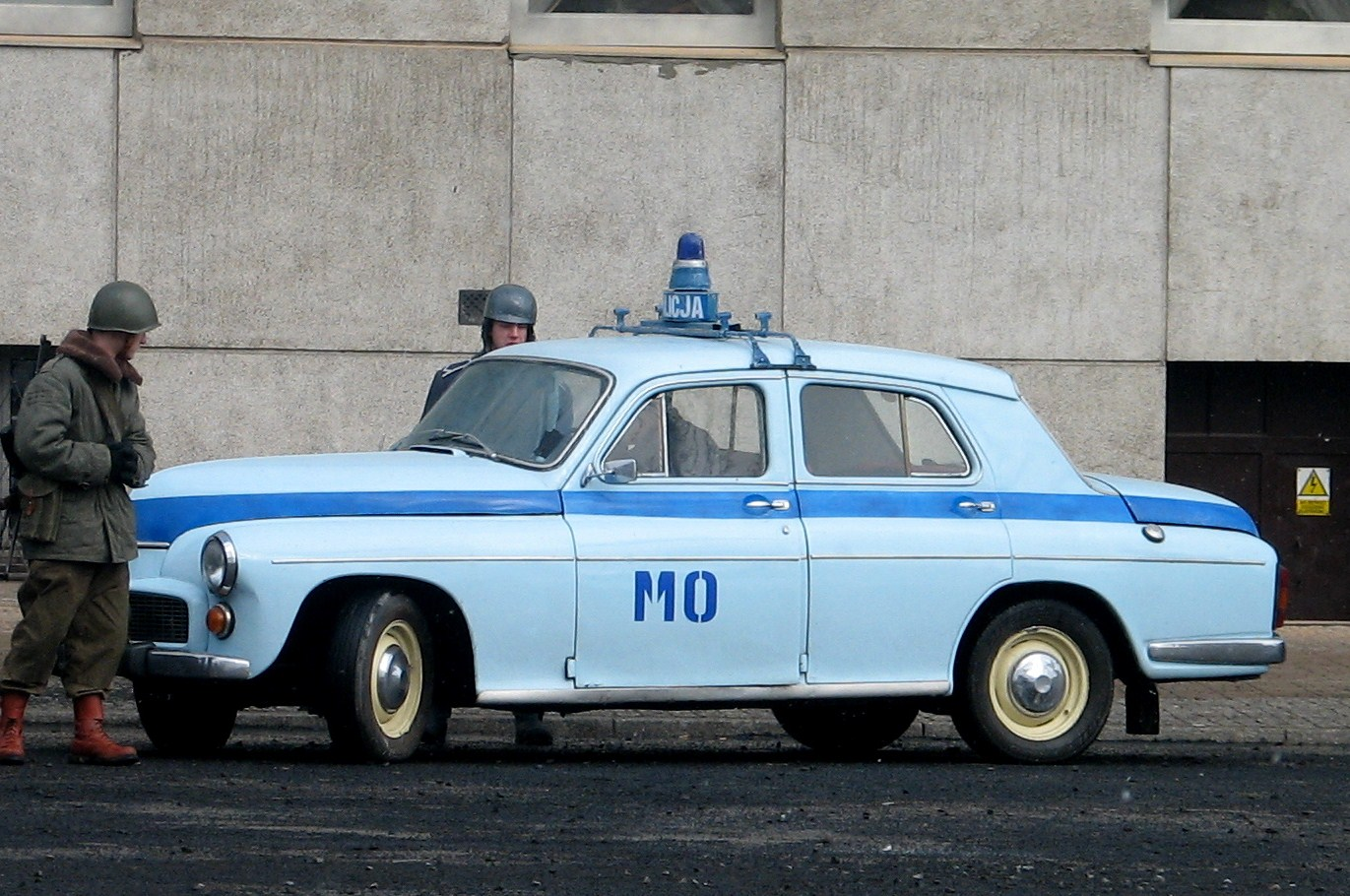
FSO Warszawa MO car

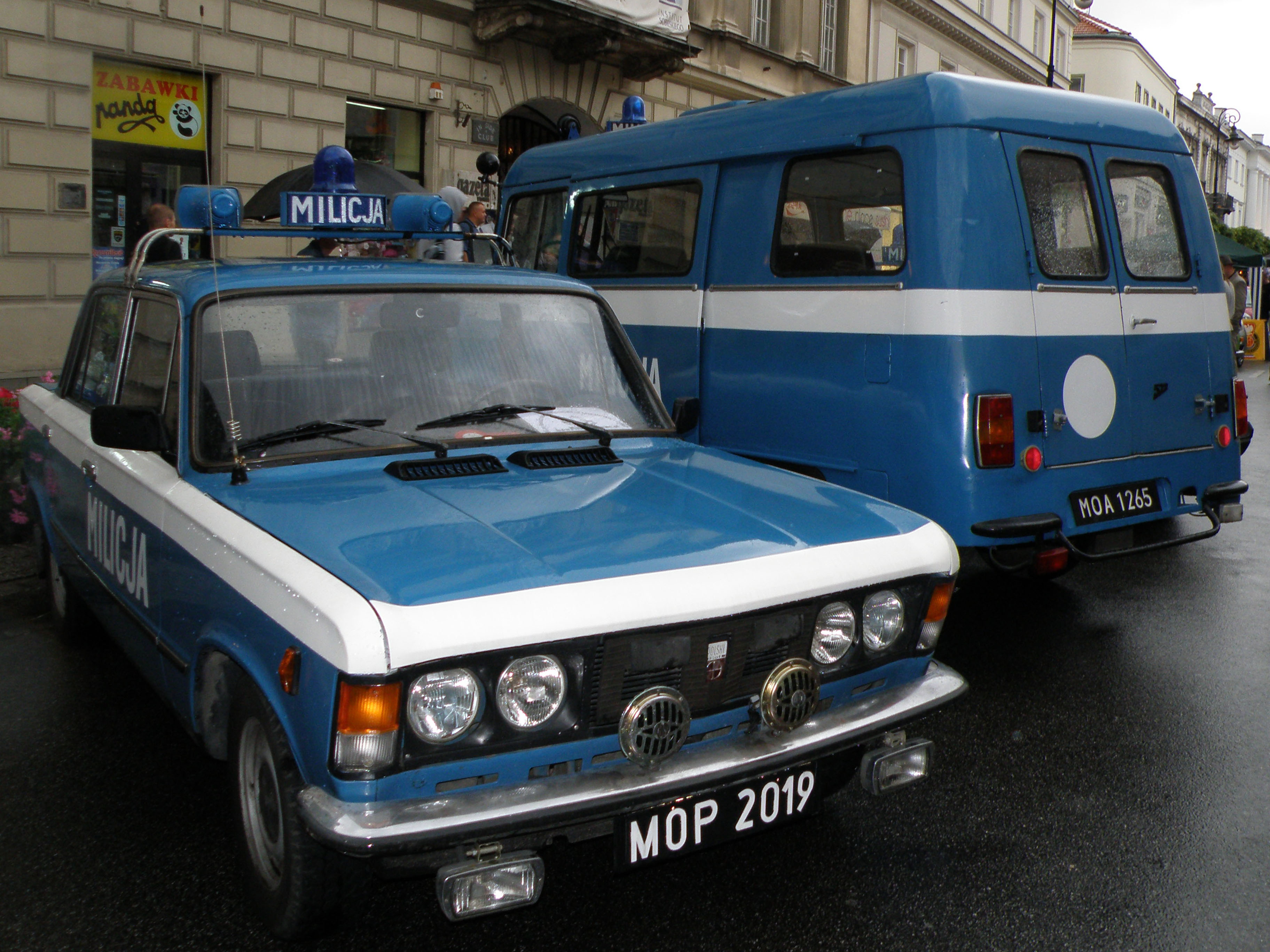
Restored Polski Fiat 125p and Nysa 522 RSD Milicja Obywatelska vehicles

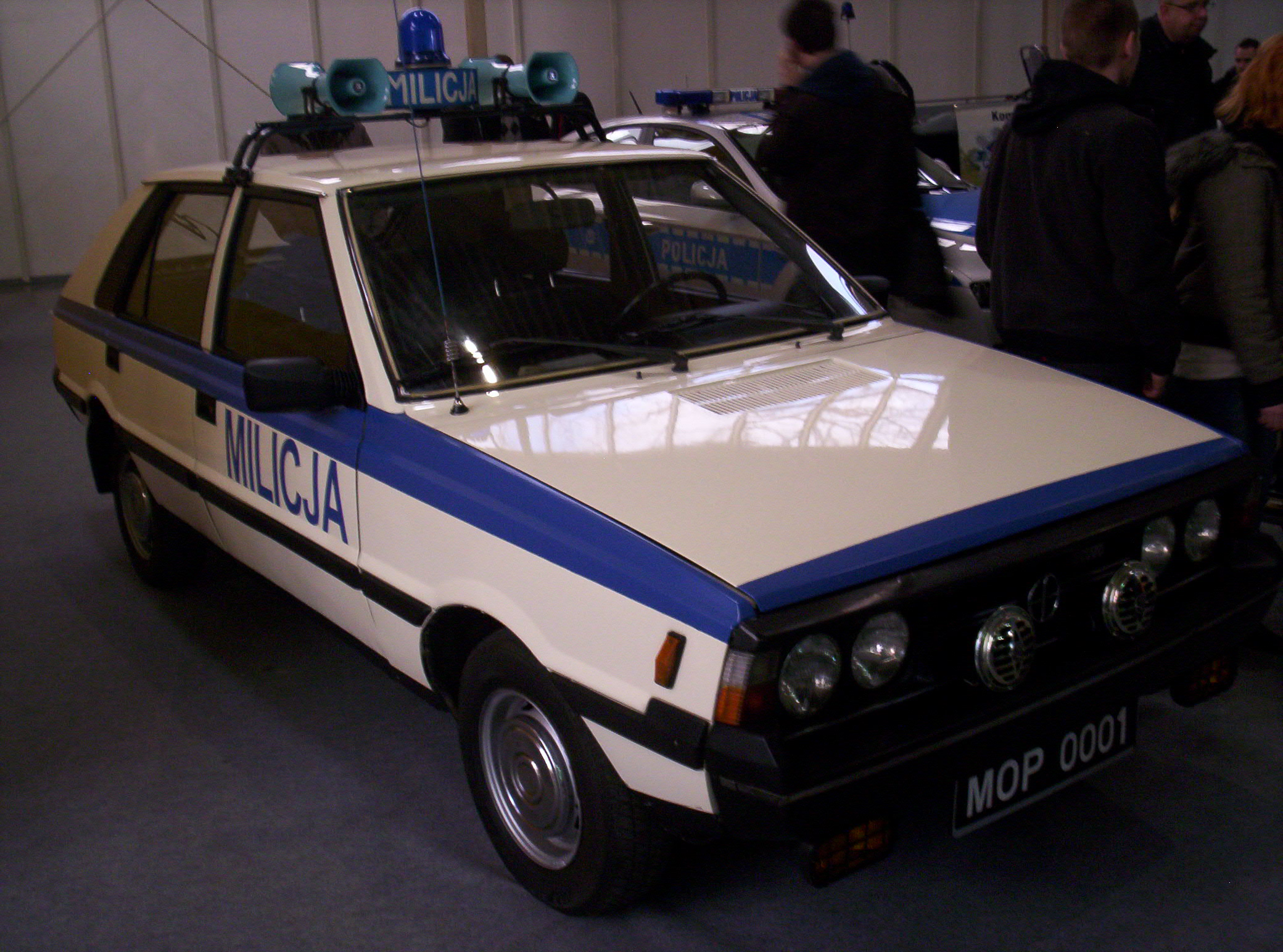
FSO Polonez MR'78 militia car in Poznan 2011

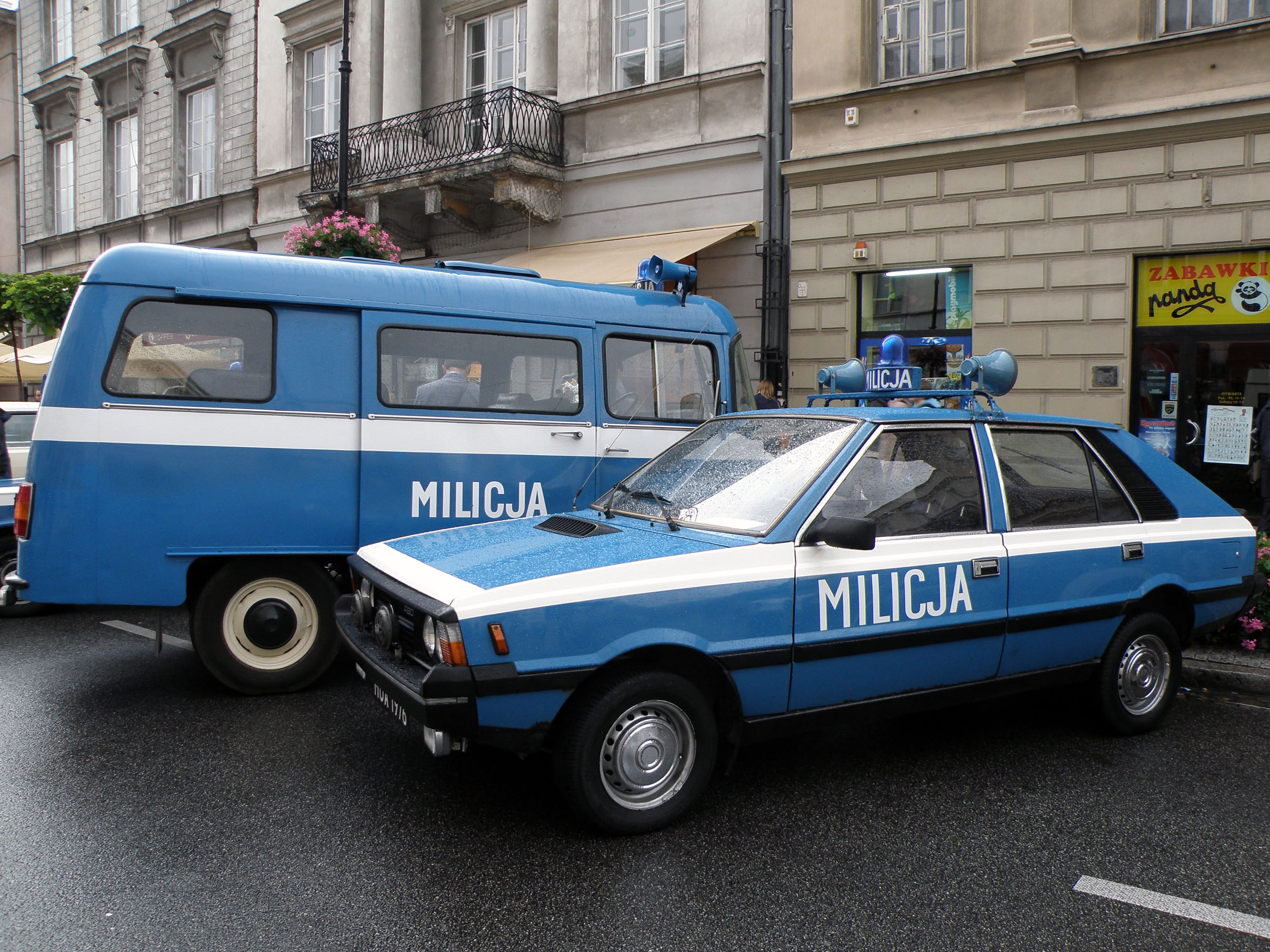
Restored FSO Polonez MR'83 and Nysa 522 RSD of Citizens' Militia of Polish People's Republic (from the reenactment group milicja.waw.pl)

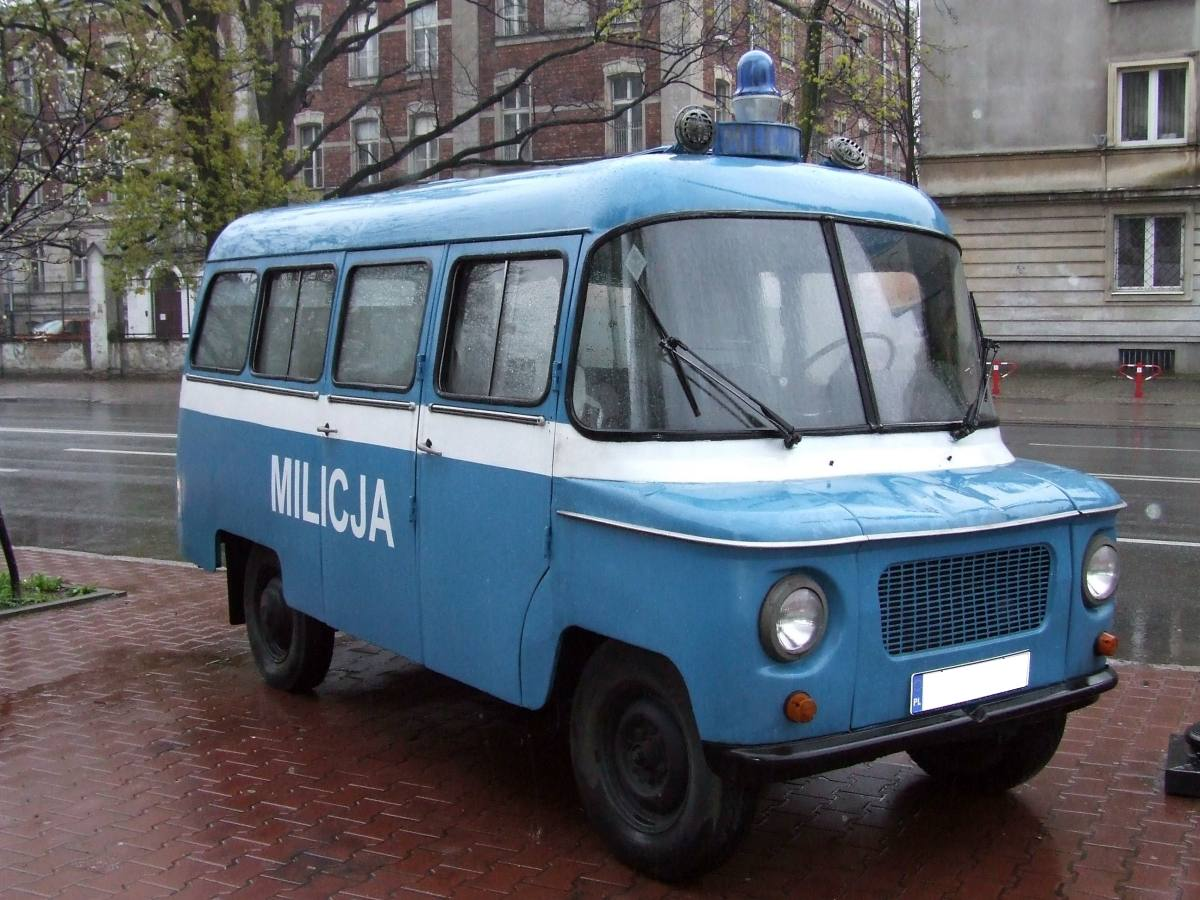
Nysa 522 RSD

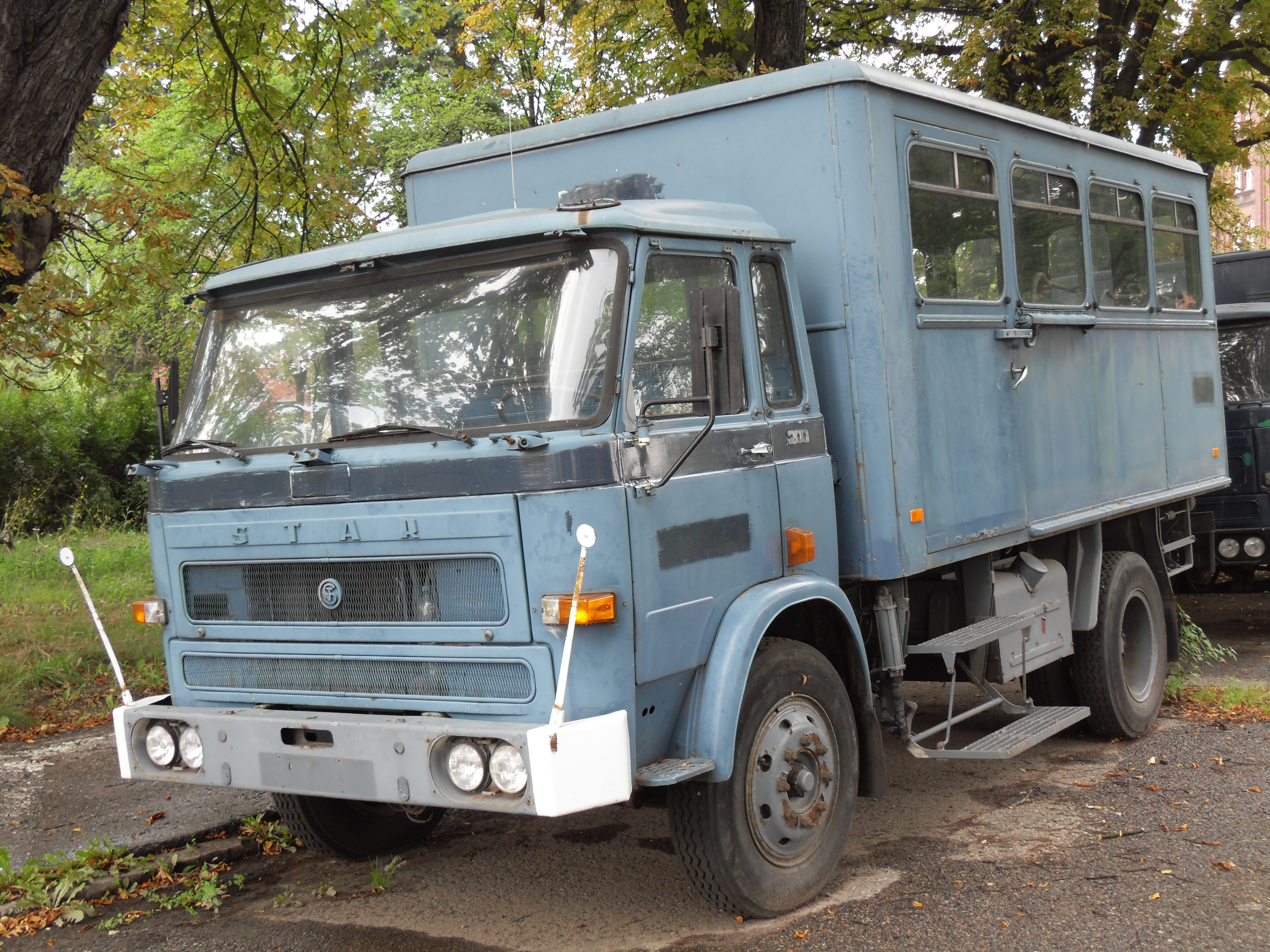
Star 200 truckbus

== See also ==
- Ministry of Public Security (UB)

== Bibliography ==
- Neville, Rolf (2017). European Counter-Terrorist Units: 1972–2017. Osprey Publishing. ISBN 978-1472825292.
