= People's Army (Poland) =

Pro-Soviet resistance militia in Nazi-occupied Poland near the end of WWII

- Armia Ludowa
- People's Army eagle insignia
- Active: 1 January 1944 – 29 July 1944 (transformed into Polish People's Army)
- Country: Poland
- Allegiance: Polish Workers' Party
- Role: Armed forces of the Polish Workers' Party
- March: Marsz Gwardii Ludowej
- Engagements: World War II; Battle of Porytowe Wzgórze; Republic of Pińczów; Warsaw Uprising; Sandomierz bridgehead

Commanders
- Notable commanders: Michał Rola-Żymierski; Franciszek Jóźwiak

The People's Army (AL; Polish: Armia Ludowa; [ˈar.mʲja luˈdɔ.va]) was a communist partisan force of the Polish Workers' Party (PPR) active in Occupied Poland during World War II from January to July 1944. It was created on the order of the Soviet-backed State National Council to fight against Nazi Germany and support the Red Army against the German forces in Poland.

The Armia Ludowa was formed from the Gwardia Ludowa ("People's Guard") to aid the creation of a pro-Soviet communist government in Poland and, along with the National Armed Forces, refused to join the structures of the Polish Underground State and Home Army. It participated in a number of uprisings and supported Red Army offensives through Poland. The Armia Ludowa became part of the new Polish People's Army of the Soviet Polish Armed Forces in the East after seven months of existence.

The Armia Ludowa was heroized in the Polish People's Republic with its size and actions being exaggerated in propaganda in communist Poland. Since the fall of communism in Poland, the Armia Ludowa has been classified as more of a Soviet partisan movement by modern-day Poland rather than part of the Polish resistance due to their close affiliation with the Soviet Union which de facto controlled it and its predecessors.

== Background ==
In September 1939, the Second Polish Republic was invaded by both Nazi Germany and the Soviet Union, one month after the signing of the Molotov-Ribbentrop Pact. On 1 September, the Germans launched their invasion of Poland from the west, considered the beginning of World War II. On 17 September, the Soviets launched their own invasion of Poland from the east. There was no formal declaration of war by either side, but Polish forces were defeated within a month and forced the Polish state to operate in exile and underground. Poland itself was divided into spheres of influence and annexed by the two powers roughly along the Curzon Line. The Polish government-in-exile established in London maintained contacts with the Polish Underground State, its representatives in Occupied Poland.

Following the German invasion of the Soviet Union in 1941, communist supporters in Poland, aided by Soviet advisers, had formed partisan units and created their own independent underground organization, whose aims were to support the Red Army against German forces. In 1943, following revelations about the Katyn massacre and the Polish government-in-exile's insistence on investigation, the Soviet Union broke off diplomatic relations and intended to establish a competing government for Poland. Communist Polish partisans became increasingly involved in the creation of a pro-Soviet communist government in Poland. In 1942, the communist Polish Workers' Party (PPR) created the Gwardia Ludowa (GL, "People's Guard") as a paramilitary force. The PPR was the favoured party of the Soviets in Poland and received the bulk of its aid. Along with a portion of the National Armed Forces, this communist-led underground was one of the military resistance organizations in Poland that refused to join the structures of the Polish Underground State, and its military arm, the Home Army (Armia Krajowa).

== History ==
=== Creation ===
On 1 January 1944, the State National Council (Krajowa Rada Narodowa, KRN) replaced the Gwardia Ludowa with the People's Army (Armia Ludowa). The KRN intended to gain volunteers from other groups. Upon its establishment, the organization comprised some 10,000 members. By the end of July 1944, when much of Poland had been occupied by the Red Army, there were some 20,000–30,000 members, with 5,000 of them being Soviet nationals. Lower estimates quote about 14,000 as its peak strength, whereas high estimates double the middle number, up to 50,000–60,000. About 6,000 of them were active full-time partisans while the remainder were reservists. Whatever its exact size, the Armia Ludowa was much smaller than the Home Army, though it much better armed as a result of Soviet air drops; it might have even had a surplus of weaponry. It also had less strict discipline.

The commander of the Armia Ludowa was General Michał Rola-Żymierski, and the chief of staff was a member of the Central Committee of the Polish Workers' Party, Colonel Franciszek Jóźwiak.

=== Operations, propaganda and criticism ===
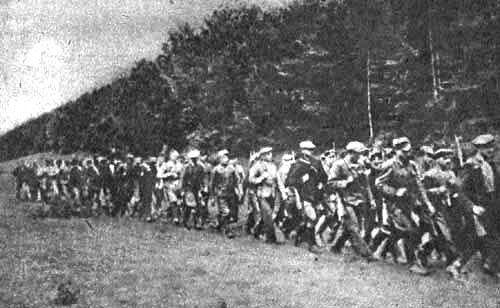
Armia Ludowa at a forest near Lublin

According to Armia Ludowa's claims, it carried out about 900 operations, killing 20,000 Germans, derailing 350 trains, and destroying 79 bridges. However, these exploits were significantly exaggerated by communist propaganda in the People's Republic of Poland. Historian Piotr Gontarczyk estimates that only about 5–10% of the officially-recorded actions really took place, and that most instances of fighting the German military were defending from German anti-partisan operations, with instances of attacking Germans on its own initiative being very rare. Rather than engaging military targets, it preferred softer targets such as German administration offices. That changed in 1944, when the GL/AL grew stronger and began engaging the German military more actively. According to the historian Mieczysław B. Biskupski, the Armia Ludowa was less concerned with fighting the Germans than with fighting the Home Army.

The Armia Ludowa took part in the Warsaw Uprising, with official claims holding that some 1,800 of its soldiers fought there, but modern research suggests the actual number to have been about 500. Although well armed, it struggled with a much poorer support network than the Home Army, which was supported by the Polish Underground State. Soviet air drops did not supply foodstuffs, often leading partisans to resort to forced requisitions, which is described by modern historians as "banditry". It often targeted mansions and churches, and there were also incidents of its soldiers murdering Jews or fighting among themselves. In one of its most secret and controversial actions, agents of the Armia Ludowa on 17 February 1944 seized an important document archive of the Polish Underground State. Documents of importance to the communist activists were taken, and the remainder was turned over to a Gestapo agent, who had been duped into participating in the operation. Seven members of the Polish Underground State were taken prisoner by the Germans in a cleanup operation and likely executed soon afterward.

=== Polish People's Army ===
On 21 July 1944, seven months after it came into existence, the Armia Ludowa was integrated into the Polish Military in the USSR and formed the new People's Army of Poland (Ludowe Wojsko Polskie, LWP). After the Red Army and the Soviet-organized 1st Polish Army entered Poland late in 1944 and early 1945, most People's Army members joined the communist 1st Polish Army. After the war, many of its members joined the ranks of the Ministry of Public Security of the Polish People's Republic, or the Milicja Obywatelska.

The Armia Ludowa were hailed as heroes in the Polish People's Republic and often the subject of early communist propaganda in Poland. State media exaggerated its size and role during the war, typically at the expense of the Home Army, who involvement was minimised and criticised. Although its size and actions were much smaller in number than the Home Army, propaganda espoused the myth that the reverse was the case. Since the fall of communism in Poland in 1989, the legacy of the Armia Ludowa has been reconsidered, mainly as its leadership took orders from the Soviet Union and represented Soviet, not Polish, interests. The Polish Institute of National Remembrance, in its official description of the Gwardia Ludowa/Armia Ludowa, goes so far as to declare the organisation as part of the Soviet partisans, rather than the Polish resistance.

== See also ==
- Soviet partisans in Poland

== Notes ==
References

- Gontarczyk, Piotr; Krzystofiński, Mariusz; Marszalec, Janusz; Polak, Barbara (March–April 2006). "O Podziemiu Komunistycznym Z Piotrem Gontarczykiem, Mariuszem Krzysztofińskim I Januszem Marszalcem Rozmawia Barbara Polak" (PDF). Biuletyn Instytutu Pamięci Narodowej (in Polish). 3–4 (62–63) (Spod czerwonej gwiazdy). ISSN 1641-9561. OCLC 51104599.
