= Klaniny =

Village in Pomeranian Voivodeship, Poland

- Village
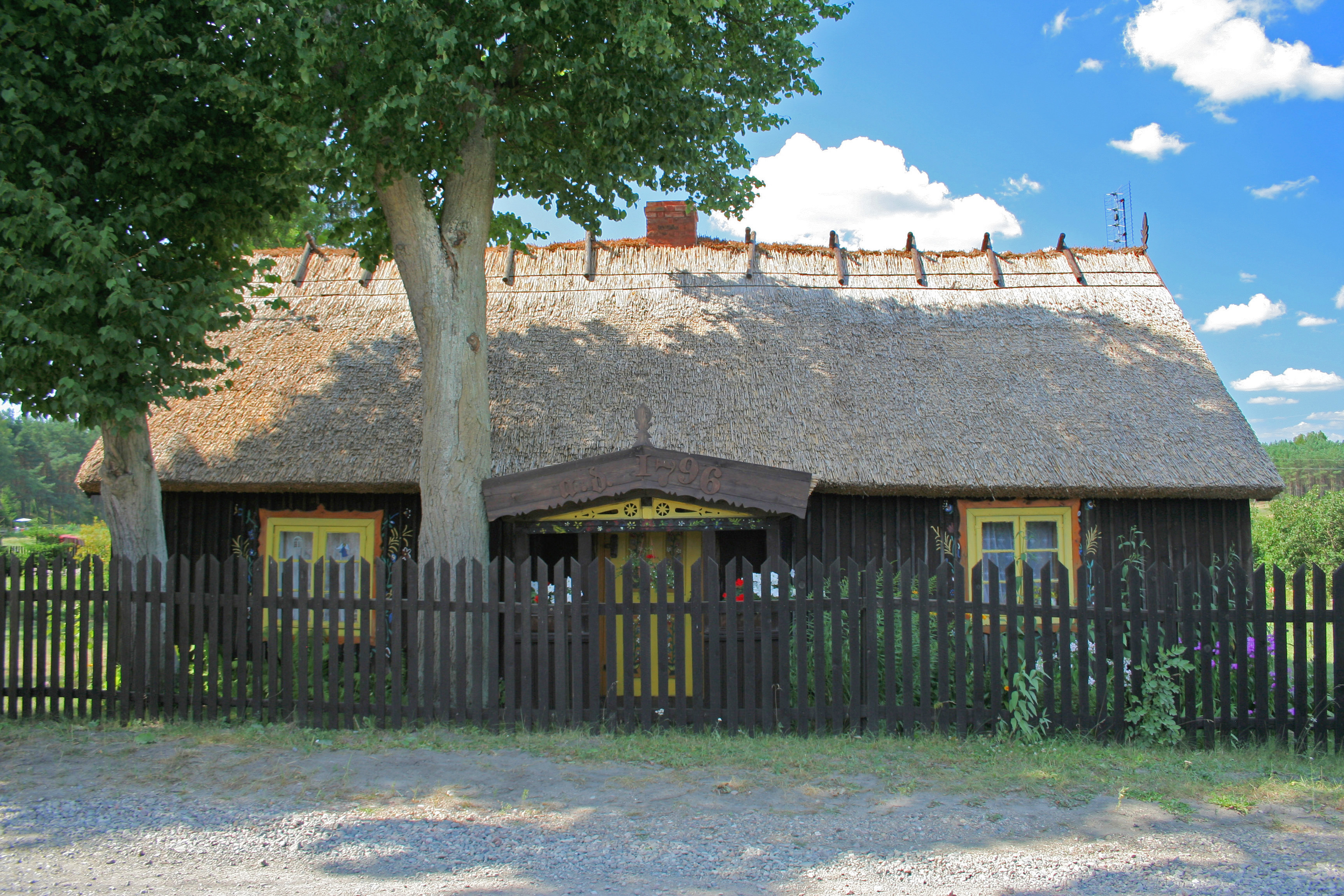
- A timber framed building from 1796 in the village

- Location within Poland
- Coordinates: 53°49′43″N 18°12′16″E
- Country: Poland
- Voivodeship: Pomeranian
- County: Starogard
- Gmina: Osieczna
- Population (2022): 156
- Time zone: UTC+1 (CET)
  - Summer (DST): UTC+2 (CEST)
- Vehicle registration: GST

Klaniny [klaˈninɨ] is a village in the administrative district of Gmina Osieczna, within Starogard County, Pomeranian Voivodeship, in northern Poland. It is located within the ethnocultural region of Kociewie in the historic region of Pomerania.
