= Legislative Sejm =

Legislative Sejm can refer to the two Polish Sejms known in Polish as Sejm Ustawodawczy:

- Legislative Sejm (Second Polish Republic), 1919–1922
- Legislative Sejm (1947–1952)
