= Taiheiyō Kōshinkyoku =

Song
- Language: Japanese
- English title: Pacific Ocean March
- Released: May 10, 1939
- Genre: March
- Composer: Hajime Fuse
- Lyricist: Masanori Yokoyama

"Taiheiyō Kōshinkyoku" (太平洋行進曲; Pacific Ocean March) is a Japanese march for Imperial Japanese Navy composed by Hajime Fuse with lyrics by Masanori Yokoyama. It was released on 10 May 1939.

== History ==
A contest for "Taiheiyō Kōshinkyoku" was held on 9 February 1939. 28,105 entries for lyrics were received, with Yokoyama's entry being declared the winner. Ryū Amaguchi, Issaku Honma and Yutaka Itō placed second, third and fourth, respectively.
