= Huta, Gmina Baranów =

Huta
- Village
- Location within Poland
- Coordinates: 51°31′43″N 22°12′22″E
- Country: Poland
- Voivodeship: Lublin
- County: Puławy
- Gmina: Baranów

Huta [ˈxuta] is a village in the administrative district of Gmina Baranów, within Puławy County, Lublin Voivodeship, in eastern Poland.
