= People's Guard (1942–1944) =

- Gwardia Ludowa
- Eagle of GL
- Active: 6 January 1942 – 1 January 1944 (transformed into People's Army)
- Country: Poland
- Allegiance: Polish Workers' Party
- Type: Partisan
- Role: Guerrilla warfare HUMINT; Patrolling; PSYWAR; Raiding; Reconnaissance
- March: Marsz Gwardii Ludowej
- Engagements: World War II; Zamość Uprising; Warsaw Ghetto Uprising

Commanders
- Notable commanders: Bolesław Mołojec; Marian Spychalski; Franciszek Jóźwiak

Insignia
- Identification symbol

The People's Guard (GL; Polish: Gwardia Ludowa; Polish pronunciation: [ˈɡvardja luˈdɔva]) was a communist partisan force of the Polish Workers' Party (PPR) active in Occupied Poland during World War II from 1942 to 1944.

The Gwardia Ludowa was established with sponsorship from the Soviet Union to support the Red Army and Polish communists against Nazi Germany. It became the largest partisan force in Poland which refused to join the structures of the Polish Underground State loyal to the London-based Polish government-in-exile. The Gwardia Ludowa was incorporated into the larger Armia Ludowa in January 1944.

== Background ==
The Gwardia Ludowa was created on 6 January 1942 with military aid from the Red Army, with the availability of firearms led to it swiftly reaching a strength of 3,000 fighters. It was connected to the NKVD, the intelligence services of the Soviet Union, to the point that some of its military actions were commanded by NKVD colonels. It was tasked with fighting against Nazi Germany by means of partisan warfare, sabotage, and reprisal actions. The full size partisan detachments were formed in May 1942 although foray groups were organized earlier. They operated near Piotrków and Radom. By the end of the year, the organisation was divided onto seven administrative districts including Warsaw, Lublin, Radom-Kielce, Kraków, Łódź, Silesia and Lwów.

== Partisan actions ==
First major operations of GL consisted of disassembling train tracks. Until December 1942 some 50 railway lines were damaged resulting in 30 German supply trains being disabled. Some 30 insurgents were caught and hanged, but the number of units grew to over 30 in the same time. The most prominent sabotage action took place on 16 November 1942 along the railway line Radom – Łuków – Terespol, where five trains and a bridge were destroyed with the use of Soviet explosives. Another five trains were derailed around Oświęcim on 25 February 1943. Throughout the year, trains were damaged around Warsaw in Olszynka Grochowska, Elsnerów, Legionowo, Żyrardów and Żywczyn. In total, Gwardia Ludowa caused damage to 169 trains in 1943, as well as 113 train stations, resulting in 55 temporary line shut-downs.

GL retaliation actions included throwing grenades into buildings frequented by the Germans. The Apollo movie theatre in Radom was attacked on 22 November 1942; the Deutsches Haus in April 1943. In Kraków and Kielce the Nur für Deutsche coffee houses were bombed in December 1942 and February 1943 respectively. The German administration building in Rzeszów was bombed also in February. Most of GL operations resulted in great number of Polish and Jewish hostages being shot by the Germans in reprisal.

=== Field organization ===
GL was divided into partisan units and garrison units assembled for quick ambushes, after which the garrison members returned to their homes. By the end of 1942 GL had approximately 5,000 men, including, at least nominally, every member of the Polish Workers' Party. By late 1943 the number rose to about 10,000. Among them approximately 1,700 were partisans, and the rest were part-time combatants. For the most part, the GL carried out acts of sabotage, including the sabotage of German rail transport.

=== Zamość Uprising ===
GL took part in the Zamość uprising - a series of partisan actions against the forced Expulsion of Poles by Nazi Germany from the Zamość region.

=== Warsaw Ghetto Uprising ===
Since the formation of GL, its soldiers worked together with Jewish partisans. In Warsaw, Polish communists like Józef Lewartowski were ones of the first organizers of the Jewish resistance in Warsaw Ghetto. During the Warsaw Ghetto Uprising People's Guard attacked German units near the Ghetto walls and attempted to smuggle weapons, ammunition, supplies, and instructions into the Ghetto. After the uprising was over, GL helped Jews to escape Ghetto and some Jewish militants joined the units of GL.

=== Attitudes to Jews ===
The leader of the Warsaw Ghetto Uprising, Yitzhak Zuckerman, wrote in his memoirs: "During the Holocaust [...] those who won our loyalty and helped us with their slim forces were the Polish Communists [...] They hated the Poland of the fascistic Sanacja and sought someone to lean on. [...] They were first of all Polish patriots who wanted to see a new Poland; and they were the only force we could rely on because of their attitude toward us, toward our Jewish group". Polish-Israeli historians Israel Gutman and Shmuel Krakowski report that in many regions of Poland, the People's Guard was the only allied force the Jewish partisans could rely on, and list ten Jewish partisan units that joined the People's Guard, alongside thirteen ethnically mixed partisan units of the People's Guard. According to Dariusz Libionka, "the fundamental difference between the AK [Armia Krajowa] and GL-AL [Gwardia Ludowa-Armia Ludowa] with regard to their attitude towards Jews was that Jews could function in GL while retaining their identity, while in the AK they could not".

According to Shmuel Krakowski, the People's Guard's attitude towards the Jewish families hiding in the forests was not uniform. In the northern part of the Lublin region, local People's Guard units helped Jewish partisans to protect a large camp of Jewish families in the Parczew forests. In the southern part of this region, however, Jews hiding in the forests were killed by a People's Guard unit.

=== Transformation ===
On 1 January 1944, by a decree of the Krajowa Rada Narodowa, the communist government installed by Stalin, the Gwardia Ludowa became a part of the newly formed Armia Ludowa.

== Commanders ==
The prominent commanders and GL chiefs of staff were Marian Spychalski, Franciszek Jóźwiak, Franciszek Zubrzycki, and Mieczysław Moczar who played a prominent role in the history of the Polish People's Republic after the war's end and was known for his ultra-nationalist and antisemitic attitude.

== Notes and references ==
=== Sources ===
- Gutman, Israel; Krakowski, Shmuel (1986). Unequal victims: Poles and Jews during World War Two. Mazal Holocaust Collection. New York: Holocaust Library. ISBN 0-89604-055-0. OCLC 16579136.
- Krakowski, Shmuel (2003). "The Attitude of the Polish Underground to the Jewish Question during the Second World War". In Zimmerman, Joshua D. (ed.). Contested memories: Poles and Jews during the Holocaust and its aftermath. Rutgers University Press. pp. 97–106. ISBN 0-8135-3158-6.
- Zuckerman, Yitzhak; Harshav, Barbara (1993). A surplus of memory : chronicle of the Warsaw Ghetto uprising. Berkeley: University of California Press. ISBN 978-0-520-91259-5. OCLC 44962295.
