= Stefan Hanka-Kulesza =

Polish independence activist and cavalry colonel

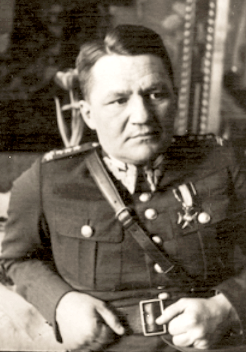
- Stefan Hanka-Kulesza in 1934
- Born: August 30, 1892; Holendernia, Congress Poland
- Died: June 5, 1964 (aged 71); London, United Kingdom
- Spouse: Pelagia Bujalska
- Military career
- Allegiance: Austro-Hungarian Army; Polish Armed Forces
- Branch: Polish Legions
- Service years: 1914–1947
- Rank: Colonel of cavalry
- Units: 3rd Mazovian Chevau-léger Regiment; 17th Cavalry Brigade; Kresowa Cavalry Brigade; Dubno Group
- Commands: Commander of cavalry regiment Commander of cavalry brigade Deputy commander of brigade Commander of Dubno Group
- Conflicts: World War I Polish–Soviet War; World War II; Invasion of Poland
- Awards: Virtuti Militari; Cross of Independence; Order of Polonia Restituta; Cross of Valour; Cross of Merit; Commemorative Medal for the War of 1918–1921; Medal of the 10th Anniversary of Regained Independence; Badge For Faithful Service

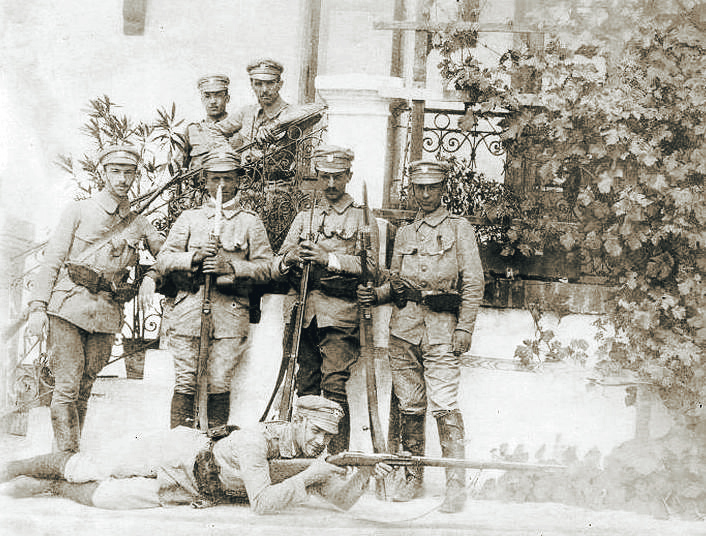
Seven Lancers of Belina in 1914, on the porch of a manor in Goszyce; Stefan Kulesza is lying down. Standing from left: Zygmunt Karwacki, codenamed Bończa, Stanisław Skotnicki, codenamed Grzmot, Janusz Głuchowski, codenamed Janusz, and Antoni Jabłoński, codenamed Zdzisław. Above them: Ludwik Skrzyński, codenamed Kmicic, and the patrol commander, Władysław Prażmowski, codenamed Belina

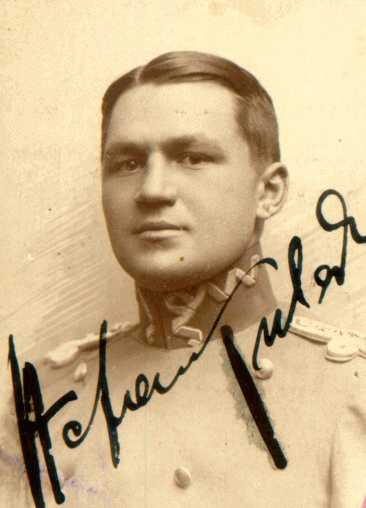
Stefan Hanka-Kulesza in a Polish Legions uniform

Stefan Hanka-Kulesza, also known as Kulesza-Hanka, born Stefan Kulesza until 1937 (30 August 1892, Holendernia, near Włodawa – 5 June 1964, London), was a Polish independence activist, engineer, and colonel in the cavalry of the Polish Armed Forces. He was a recipient of the Order of Virtuti Militari for his service between 1914 and 1921.

While studying engineering at the Ghent University, he joined the Union of Associations of Polish Independence Youth and the Riflemen's Association. At the outbreak of World War I, he was in Kraków attending an officer training course and joined the Seven Lancers of Belina, the first Polish military unit to cross the border from the Austrian Partition into the Russian Partition. He later served in the 1st Uhlans Regiment of Polish Legions, becoming a second lieutenant and deputy squadron commander. Following the Oath crisis in 1917, he was arrested and interned in Beniaminów.

In November 1918, he joined the Polish Army as a major. During the Polish–Soviet War, he commanded the newly formed 3rd Mazovian Chevau-léger Regiment. He distinguished himself in combat, particularly during the Battle of Warsaw, where he was severely wounded leading a bayonet charge on 17 August. In the interwar period, he commanded the 3rd Chevau-léger Regiment but was removed in 1930 due to irregularities. He later led the 17th Cavalry Brigade and, from August 1939, the Kresowa Cavalry Brigade. During the Invasion of Poland, he was relieved of command early in the campaign but later led the improvised Dubno Group, fighting Ukrainian insurgents, the Red Army, and the Wehrmacht. He surrendered on 25 September 1939 and spent the rest of the war in a prisoner-of-war camp. After the war, he lived in exile in London.

== Biography ==
Stefan Hanka-Kulesza was born on 30 August 1892 at the Holendernia estate near Włodawa, in the Russian Partition. His father, Józef Kulesza, was the estate owner, and his mother was Leokadia, née Pytkowska.

He began his education at a real school in Siedlce, but after the 1905 school strikes and the 1905 revolution, he transferred to Płock, where he completed a five-year gymnasium. He continued his studies at the Hipolit Wawelberg and Stanisław Rotwand School of Engineering in Warsaw, earning an engineering degree after a three-year machine construction course. In 1912, he pursued further engineering studies at the Ghent University in Belgium. During his studies, he joined the Union of Associations of Polish Independence Youth, linked to the Polish Socialist Party – Revolutionary Faction, and the Union of Active Struggle. He also joined the Riflemen's Association, personally admitted by its leader, Kazimierz Sosnkowski. In the Riflemen's Association, he adopted the pseudonym "Hanka", which later became part of his surname.

In the summer of 1914, he attended a non-commissioned officer course in Kraków. At the outbreak of World War I, he joined the Seven Lancers of Belina, a patrol led by Władysław Belina-Prażmowski, whom he had met during his studies in Belgium. On the night of 1–2 August, this seven-man unit became the first Polish military group to cross the border from the Austrian Partition into the Russian Partition at Kocmyrzów. The patrol conducted reconnaissance through Goszyce, Działoszyce, Jędrzejów, and Słomniki, returning to the manor in Goszyce. On the evening of 3 August or after 4:00 PM the next day, the patrol returned to Kraków. On 6 August, its members joined the First Cadre Company and marched to Miechów.

Hanka-Kulesza then served in the 1st Uhlans Regiment of Polish Legions under Belina's command. In 1915, he was assigned to lead the 3rd Platoon of the 3rd Squadron. On 1 November 1916, he was promoted to second lieutenant of cavalry. From 6 February to 4 April 1917, he commanded a cavalry non-commissioned officer course for the 1st Uhlans Regiment in Ostrołęka. In April 1917, he became deputy commander of the 5th Squadron, training new recruits. Following the Oath crisis on 15 July 1917, he was arrested and interned in Beniaminów.

In April 1918, he was released from internment and returned to his family estate, where he married Pelagia Bujalska, of the Ślepowron coat of arms.

=== Polish–Soviet War ===
In November 1918, Hanka-Kulesza joined the Polish Armed Forces as a major and was appointed commander of the reserve squadron of the 7th Lublin Uhlan Regiment stationed in Ciechanów. On 15 July 1920, with seniority from 1 April 1920, he was confirmed as a major in the cavalry, among officers of the former Polish Legions.

In July 1920, during the urgent mobilization following the retreat from Ukraine, his squadron formed a heavy machine gun unit for the newly establish 3rd Mazovian Chevau-léger Regiment. The 28-year-old Major Hanka-Kulesza was appointed the regiment's first commander and led it to the front of the Polish–Soviet War.

Historian Władysław Lewandowski notes that Hanka-Kulesza proved himself a brave and capable wartime commander. The regiment was hastily formed with diverse equipment: British rifles, Polish and Russian sabres, German lances, Canadian and American saddles, and Maxim heavy machine guns on tachankas. With no time for training or weapon testing, weapons were issued on 2 August 1920, and the 1st and 3rd Squadrons departed for the front from Kyiv railway station in Warsaw on 3 August, followed by the 2nd Squadron the next day.

Hanka-Kulesza led the 2nd and 3rd Squadrons in delaying actions around Zambrów, then covered the infantry retreat behind the Kosówka river, Liwiec, Osownica, and onto the Warsaw bridgehead near Okuniew. During the Battle of Warsaw, after the loss of Radzymin, the 201st Regiment protected Jabłonna from the east starting 14 August, engaging in heavy fighting with the Red Army near Nieporęt. After recapturing Radzymin, the regiment was rapidly redeployed to Płońsk to join the forming Northern Cavalry Division under Colonel Gustaw Orlicz-Dreszer.

On 17 August, near Baboszewo by Ćwiklin, three dismounted squadrons of the regiment faced an assault by three regiments of the 18th Soviet Rifle Division advancing on Płońsk from Arcelin. After a six-hour battle, despite exhausting their ammunition, Hanka-Kulesza's forces held the line and forced the enemy to retreat. However, he was severely wounded during a bayonet counterattack. Relieved of command – either the same day or on 18 August – he was evacuated, and Captain Rudolf Dreszer assumed temporary command. Hanka-Kulesza returned to his unit on 30 December 1920 in Kupiczów near Kovel, after the armistice.

=== Interwar period ===
After the war and demobilization, Hanka-Kulesza remained commander of his regiment, first in Płock, then in Vawkavysk from autumn 1921, and finally in Suwałki from May 1922. On 3 May 1922, he was verified as a major with seniority from 1 June 1919, ranked 42nd among cavalry officers.

In 1922, his wife, Pelagia Kuleszyna, became the godmother of the 3rd Regiment's banner. During peacetime, the regiment sent units to patrol the borders with the Soviet Union and Lithuania, and Hanka-Kulesza oversaw reservist training. On 31 March 1924, he was promoted to lieutenant colonel with seniority from 1 July 1923, ranked 8th among cavalry officers. On 1 January 1928, President Ignacy Mościcki promoted him to colonel with seniority from 1 January 1928, ranked 13th in the cavalry corps.

However, reports of lax discipline, drunkenness, gambling among officers, and Hanka-Kulesza treating the regiment as a personal estate reached his superiors. On 26 March 1930, he was relieved of command.

On 31 March 1930, he was appointed commander of the 17th Cavalry Brigade in Hrubieszów. In the 1930s, his units were repeatedly disqualified during maneuvers, but he received high evaluations from the Sanation leadership. Colonel Jerzy Grobicki, a fellow legionnaire, later suggested that Hanka-Kulesza's fame from the Seven Lancers of Belina in 1914 made him untouchable.

In April 1937, he became deputy commander of the Kresowa Cavalry Brigade in Brody. On 16 September 1937, the Lublin Voivode permitted him to change his surname from "Kulesza" to "Hanka-Kulesza".

=== World War II ===
In August 1939, Hanka-Kulesza assumed command of the Kresowa Cavalry Brigade. Initially held in reserve by Łódź Army, the brigade was deployed to the Warta river on 2 September. On the morning of 3 September, it disembarked from rail transport near Szadek to reinforce the 10th Infantry Division, forming part of General Franciszek Dindorf-Ankowicz Grupa Operacyjna „Sieradz”|Sieradz Operational Group. That same day, Hanka-Kulesza reported to the Łódź Army headquarters at 10 Julianowska Street in Julianów, Łódź-Bałuty, where General Juliusz Rómmel confirmed orders to strengthen the Warta's right bank and conduct delaying actions. On 4 September, west of Warta, the brigade engaged the German 24th Infantry Division. Soon after, General Rómmel ordered the brigade to retreat to the river's opposite bank and move to reserve positions. The brigade complied, disengaging from the enemy and returning to positions near Szadek, resulting in the loss of Warta and several bridges in the area.

For reasons not fully clear, Hanka-Kulesza was relieved of command on 4 September by the Łódź Army commander and reassigned as deputy commander of the brigade. His position was taken by Colonel Jerzy Grobicki. Some sources suggest his removal was an attempt to blame him for strategic errors by his superior. Historian Paweł Wieczorkiewicz argues that Hanka-Kulesza abandoned his brigade without authorization. Regardless, after 6 September, he left his unit and traveled to Warsaw, possibly to clarify the situation, following General Rómmel. In Warsaw, he was not reinstated as brigade commander but was sent to Dubno to organize the city's defense.

In Dubno, Hanka-Kulesza initially served as deputy commander of the garrison under General Stefan Strzemieński, later becoming commander of the improvised Dubno Group. Formed on 12 September, this operational group was tasked with defending the city and the Ikva river line against a potential Wehrmacht advance into Volhynia. After the Soviet invasion on 17 September, the group abandoned Dubno without a fight and moved south, aiming to join General Kazimierz Sosnkowski's Southern Front forces operating near Lviv. Along the way, it absorbed rear units and scattered soldiers from broken formations, engaging in skirmishes with Ukrainian insurgents and Soviet advance patrols.

On 21 September, the Dubno Group won a skirmish at Kamianka-Buzka against the German 4th Light Division. Due to changing front conditions, Hanka-Kulesza ordered his forces to break through to Hungary. He then decided to attack Rava-Ruska with all available forces, expecting a strong German garrison. Due to the overextension of his units, the Dubno Group joined the battle of Rava-Ruska throughout 24 September. After a day-long, exhausting fight against the 2nd Panzer Division, his forces inflicted significant losses but failed to break through, with some units panicking and disintegrating. At a nighttime commanders' meeting, Hanka-Kulesza deemed further breakthrough attempts impossible and ordered surrender. Terms were agreed upon on the morning of 25 September 1939 with the 2nd Panzer Division's staff, and by 10:30 AM, Polish soldiers began laying down arms. Over 2,000 soldiers and officers were taken into German captivity. The Bellona Publishing House's guide Boje polskie describes his command in this battle as "inept". However, Paweł Wieczorkiewicz notes that Hanka-Kulesza "wrote a fine page in the final stage of the campaign" and "recorded a notable episode in the fight against the Soviets".

He was captured by the Germans and spent the remainder of the war in Oflag VII-A Murnau. After the war, he settled in Paris, then moved to London, where he established a business and lived until his death on 5 June 1964. He is buried at North Sheen Cemetery in southwest London.

== Bibliography ==
- Lewandowski, Władysław (1986). "Zarys historii 201 Pułku Szwoleżerów – 3 Pułku Szwoleżerów Mazowieckich im. płk. Jana Kozietulskiego (lipiec 1920 – 23 sierpnia 1939)" [Outline of the History of the 201st Chevau-léger Regiment – 3rd Mazovian Chevau-léger Regiment Named After Col. Jan Kozietulski (July 1920 – 23 August 1939)]. Acta Universitatis Nicolai Copernici (in Polish). 167. Toruń: Nicolaus Copernicus University in Toruń. ISSN 0860-1232. Archived from the original on 9 May 2017.
