= Janusz Głuchowski =

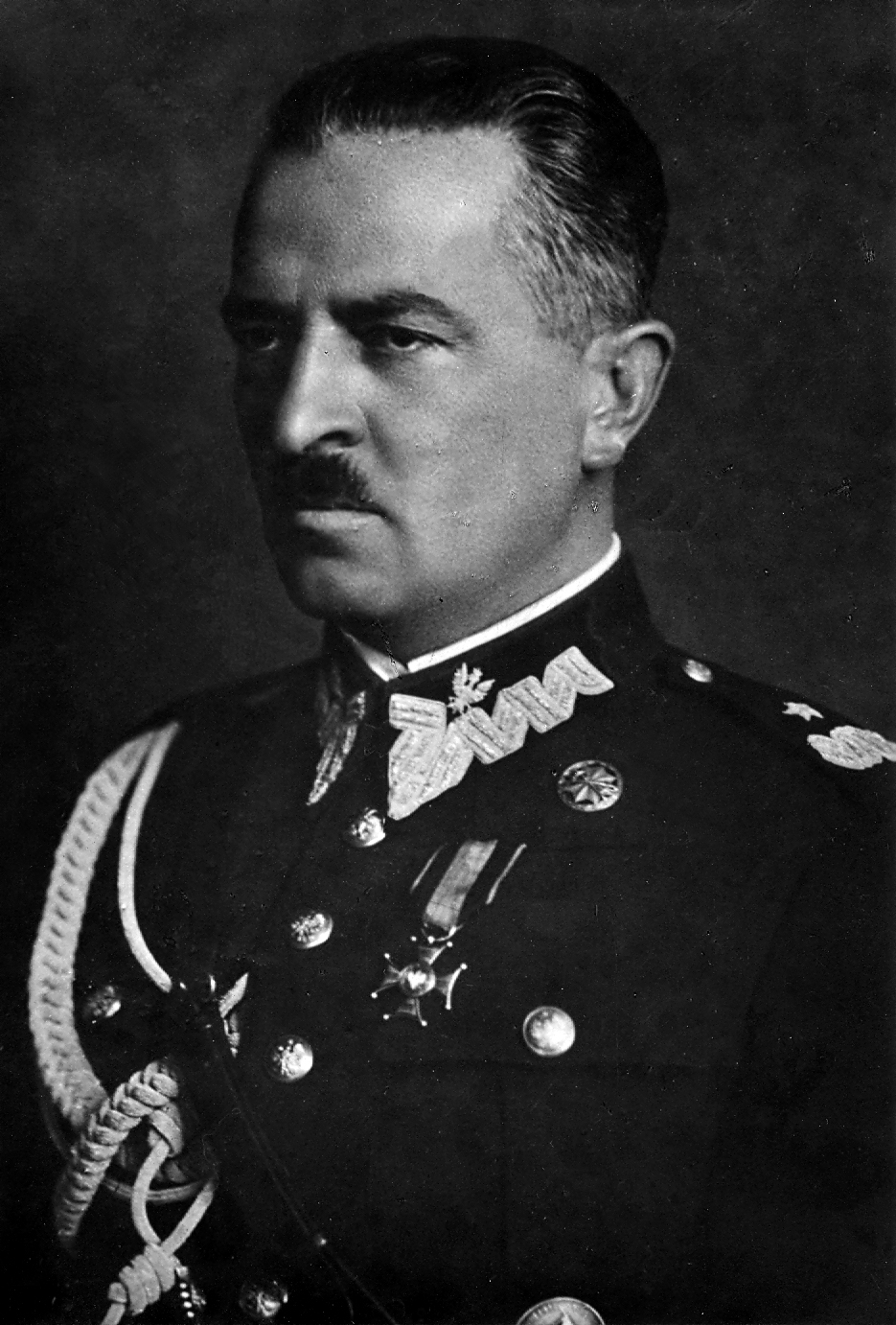
- Głuchowski in 1938
- Born: 6 August 1888; Bukowa, Congress Poland
- Died: 11 June 1964 (aged 75); London, England
- Military career
- Allegiance: Second Polish Republic (1918–1939)
- Branch: Austro-Hungarian Army; Polish Legions; Polish Armed Forces
- Service years: 1919-1947
- Rank: Generał dywizji (divisional general)
- Commands: Division commander
- Conflicts: World War I Polish–Soviet War; World War II

Janusz Julian Głuchowski (nom de guerre Janusz) was a divisional general of the Polish Army in the Second Polish Republic. Born on August 6, 1888, in Bukowa (Congress Poland), he fought in Polish Legions in World War I, Polish–Ukrainian War, Polish–Soviet War and the Invasion of Poland. Głuchowski died on June 11, 1964, in London.

As a teenager, Głuchowski attended a high school in Częstochowa, where he joined a secret Polish organization and took part in a school strike action. In 1905, he became a member of Combat Organization of the Polish Socialist Party, and was wounded in one hand during a raid near Częstochowa. To avoid arrest by Russian authorities, Głuchowski left for Belgium, where he studied at the University of Liège. In 1909, he founded Belgian branch of Union of Active Struggle.

Głuchowski returned to partitioned Poland in ca. 1910, and settled in Austrian Galicia. In 1912, he graduated from officer school of the Riflemen's Association in Stroza near Kraków. In August 1914, he commanded a platoon in Oleandry, and was deputy of Władysław Belina-Prażmowski during the legendary raid of the so-called Seven Lancers of Belina. On August 6, together with First Cadre Company, Głuchowski left Kraków and marched to Miechów.

In October 1914 he was promoted to lieutenant (Poruchik), and in November 1916 to Rittmeister. Until 1917, he served in 1st Polish Legions Uhlan Regiment, and was its last commandant. After the Oath crisis, Głuchowski was interned first in Fort Beniaminów, later in Werl.

Released in October 1918, Głuchowski came to Lublin, where in early November he formed 3rd Uhlan Regiment (later renamed into 7th Lublin Uhlan Regiment). Together with his unit, Głuchowski fought in the Polish–Soviet War. On May 29, 1920, he was promoted to Polkovnik. In July 1920, Głuchowski was transferred to Eastern Galicia, where he took command of 1st Cavalry Brigade, and fought against the Soviets in both Galicia and Volhynia.

After the war, he remained in his post until 1925, when he was transferred to 4th Cavalry Brigade. On March 16, 1927, Głuchowski was promoted to General brygady. On June 4, 1930, he was appointed commandant of Center of Higher Military Studies, and three years later, after death of General Stanislaw Tessaro, he was named commandant of Military District X in Przemyśl. In October 1935, he became deputy Minister of Military Affairs.

In the early days of the Invasion of Poland, Głuchowski ordered General Walerian Czuma to prepare the defence of Warsaw. In mid-September 1939 he fled to Romania, and was interned in a camp. After the escape, Głuchowski managed to travel to the Middle East, and in January 1941 he was ordered to come to London. In October 1941 he was appointed commandant of Training Brigade, stationed in Scotland. On September 23, 1943, Głuchowski was named commandant of all units of the Polish Army stationed in Great Britain, except for the 1st Independent Parachute Brigade, which remained under authority of Commander in Chief. On June 1, 1945, Głuchowski was promoted to divisional general.

In 1945, Głuchowski decided not to return to Soviet-occupied Poland, and remained in Great Britain. He frequently criticized Soviet regime and Soviet occupational authorities in postwar Poland. Furthermore, he was one of founders and chairman of Jozef Pilsudski Institute in London. Głuchowski was an active member of Polish community of Great Britain: he was chairman and honorary member of several organizations of Polish veterans. He died on June 11, 1964, in London.

== See also ==
- List of Polish generals
- Polish government-in-exile

== Awards ==
- Silver Cross of the Virtuti Militari,
- Cross of Independence with Swords,
- Commander's Cross of Order of Polonia Restituta,
- Cross of Valour (four times),
- Golden Cross of Merit,
- Order of the Cross of the Eagle,
- Commander of the Legion of Honour,
- Chevalier of the Legion of Honour,
- Order of Lāčplēsis,
- Commander of the Order of the Star of Romania,
- Companion of the Order of the Bath.
