= Ludwik Kmicic-Skrzyński =

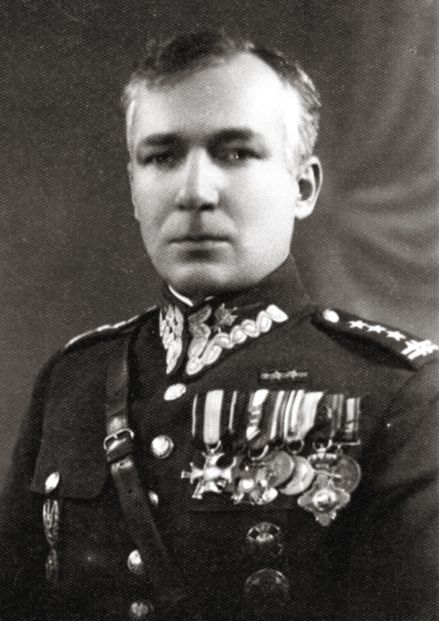
- Born: 26 August 1893; Odessa, Russian Empire
- Died: 14 February 1972 (aged 78); Manchester, England
- Burial place: Municipal Cemetery, Białystok
- Military career
- Branch: Polish Legions; Polish Army
- Rank: Brigadier general
- Units: 2nd Polish Corps; Podlaska Cavalry Brigade
- Conflicts: World War I Polish–Soviet War; World War II
- Awards: Virtuti Militari, Cross of Independence, Order of Polonia Restituta, Cross of Valour, Cross of Merit, Order of the Star of Romania

Ludwik Kmicic-Skrzyński (August 26, 1893 – February 14, 1972) was a brigadier general of the Polish Army during the existence of the Second Polish Republic.

== Biography ==
After graduating from high school in Tiflis in Georgia, he went to France, where he studied at the chemistry department of the polytechnic in Nancy. In 1911, he studied at the Polytechnic in Liège, Belgium. In 1912, he joined the Riflemen's Association, organized a platoon of the Riflemen's Association in Nancy and became its commander.

In 1914, he moved to Kraków, where he attended the officer course of the Riflemen's Association. In August 1914, he joined the Polish Legions.

He was a member of the so-called "Uhlan Seven" - the patrol of Władysław Prażmowski "Belina", which on the night of 1 to 2 August was the first to cross the border of the Austrian partition with the Russian partition in Kocmyrzów and returned to Kraków on 3 August in the evening, and on 6 August set off with the 1st Cadre Company to Miechów.

He then held the following positions: platoon commander in the 1st Uhlans Regiment of Polish Legions (1914-1915), commander of the 7th company in the 5th Infantry Regiment (from May 1915 to February 1916) and again served in the 1st Uhlan Regiment of Władysław Belina-Prażmowski. From 6 February to 1 April 1917 he taught the subject "fortification" at the cavalry non-commissioned officer course at the 1st Uhlan Regiment in Ostrołęka. In July of that year, after the oath crisis, he was interned in the camp in Beniaminów, where he stayed until August 1918.

In October 1918, he was accepted into the Polish Army and appointed squadron commander, and later deputy commander of the 1st Light Cavalry Regiment in Chełm. Together with this regiment, he participated in the capture of Vilnius and the Kiev offensive. In July 1920, he became commander of the 16th Greater Poland Uhlan Regiment, at the head of which he fought in the Battle of Warsaw, in the battles of Sejny, Niemen River and in the last offensive on Krzywicze ending the Polish-Bolshevik War. In March 1921, he was sent to a training course at the Central Cavalry School in Grudziądz.

From October 1921 to October 1924, he was the deputy commander of the 11th Legions Uhlan Regiment in Ciechanów. From October 1924 to October 1925, he studied at the Higher Military School in Warsaw. In May 1926, during the coup d'état, he sided with Józef Piłsudski. After completing the course, he was appointed chief of staff of the 2nd Cavalry Division in Warsaw. In September 1926, he was transferred to the Ministry of Military Affairs and appointed to the position of head of the General Department of the 2nd Cavalry Department. On June 25, 1927, he was transferred to the Border Protection Corps and assigned to the command of the 5th KOP Brigade as an instructor officer. On 21–24 March 1928 in Brest on the Bug River he took part in a war game as commander of the 4th Cavalry Regiment and at the same time commander of a separate unit of the 44th Rifle Division (red side). The game director, Major General Józef Rybak, gave him the following opinion: "a very good, very energetic officer of the General Staff. A cavalryman with great temperament and work ambition. Suitable for an independent position in tactical and operational terms".

On 31 May 1927, the voivode of Polesie Voivodeship allowed him to change his family name "Skrzyński" to "Skrzyński-Kmicic".

On 12 March 1929 he was appointed commander of the "Białystok" Cavalry Brigade, which on 1 April 1937 was renamed the Podlaska Cavalry Brigade. He commanded the brigade for ten years and six months. In the meantime, from 10 November 1931 to 15 July 1932, he was a student of the 6th Course of the Centre for Higher Military Studies.

Together with the Podlasie Cavalry Brigade, he took part in the September campaign, initially as part of the Independent Operational Group "Narew", and then the Independent Operational Group Polesie. He took part in the Battle of Kock and was captured on 6 October 1939. He was held in German captivity in Opava, and from 24 January 1942 in Oflag II B Arnswalde in today's Choszczno. Then from mid-May 1942 to April 1945 in Oflag II-D Gross-Born. After leaving the camp, he went to Italy and joined the 2nd Polish Corps.

After the Corps was disbanded, he left for England and settled in Manchester, where he worked as a manual laborer in local factories and then as a clerk. Regardless of his job, he was active in the cavalry community. He was also involved in journalism on the history of cavalry in the Second Polish Republic. He published a number of articles in the "Przegląd Kawalerii i Broni Pancernej" in London, as well as his memoirs and accounts of World War I and II. He died on February 14, 1972 in Manchester and was buried in the Southern Cemetery. A symbolic burial took place at the Powązki Military Cemetery. In 2023, Kmicic-Skrzyński's remains were exhumed. The coffin with his body was then transported to Poland. On the general's 130th birthday, August 26, 2023, a funeral was held at the Municipal Cemetery in Białystok, where Ludwik Kmicic-Skrzyński was laid to rest next to his soldiers from 1939. The entire undertaking was carried out by the Jan Olszewski Foundation "Help for Poles in the East" on behalf of the Chancellery of the Prime Minister, as part of the program "Renovation works of Polish graves in Great Britain and exhumations, repatriation and burials in the country of people distinguished for Poland, including members of the Polish government in exile."
