= Wacław Lipiński =

Polish lieutenant colonel, resistance member, and historian (1896–1949)

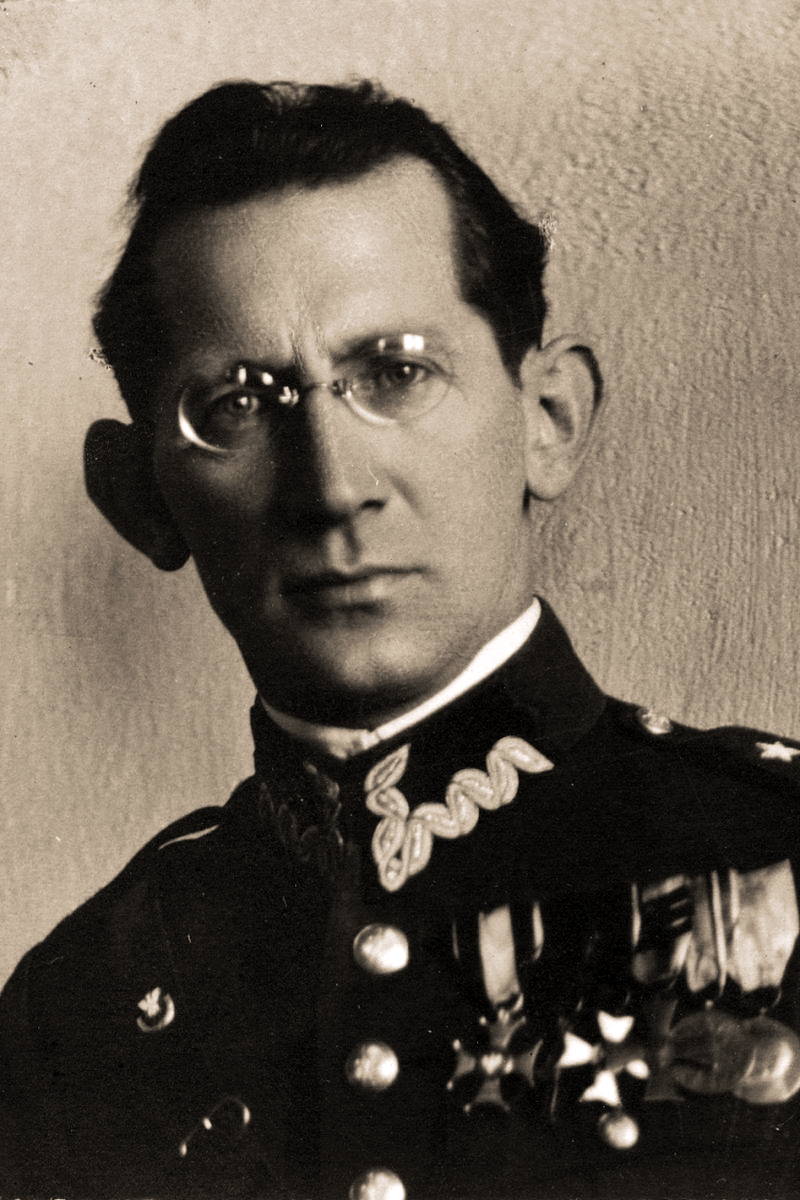

Personal details
- Born: 28 September 1896 Łódź, Kingdom of Poland, Russia (modern-day Łódź, Poland)
- Died: 4 April 1949 (aged 52) Wronki, Poland
- Education: Jagiellonian University
- Profession: Historian, writer

Military service
- Allegiance: Second Polish Republic
- Branch/service: Polish Legions Polish Armed Forces
- Years of service: 1914–1947
- Rank: Podpułkownik (Lieutenant colonel)
- Battles/wars: First World War; Polish–Ukrainian War; Polish–Soviet War; Invasion of Poland; Second World War

Wacław Lipiński (1896–1949) was a Polish historian, military officer and resistance fighter, lieutenant colonel in the Polish Army of the Second Polish Republic, recipient of Polish highest military decoration, the Order of Virtuti Militari.

Lipiński fought in World War I, the Polish-Ukrainian War and the Polish-Soviet War and became involved with the intelligence service. After the war, he worked as a historian. Lipiński retired from the army 9 months before the joint German-Soviet invasions of Poland. He was attached to the propaganda department during the siege of Warsaw, escaping with his family when the city fell.

In 1942 he returned to Poland as a resistance leader and was arrested by the Nazis in 1944. After the Russians overran Poland he led the anti-Soviet resistance. Arrested by the communists in 1947 he died in prison 2 years later.

== World War I ==
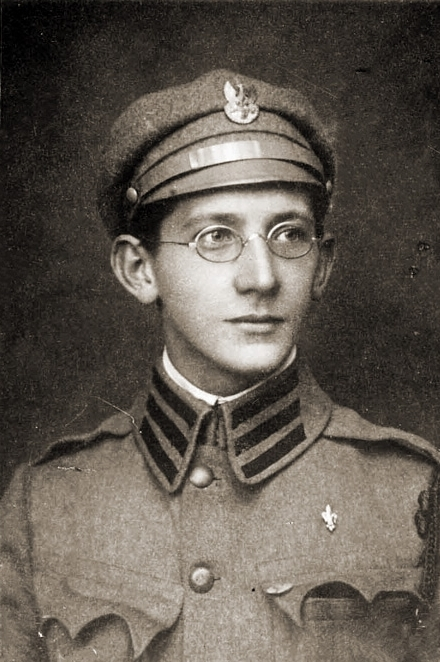
Lipiński in 1915 as a soldier in the Polish Legions

Born on 28 September 1896 in Łódź, Lipiński was involved in the scouting movement from 1911 and joined the paramilitary Polish Rifle Squads in 1912. He was a member of the Polish Legions in World War I, where he fought in the battles of Łowczówek, Konary and battle of Kostiuchnówk. He then joined the precursor of the Polish intelligence service, the Polish Military Organisation. In 1918 he joined the regular Polish Army and fought in the battle of Lwów of the Polish-Ukrainian War and then in the Polish-Soviet War (1919-1921), taking part in the Vilna offensive.

== Inter-war years ==
In 1927 he was promoted to major and joined the newly founded Military Bureau of History (Wojskowe Biuro Historyczne). In 1932 he become chief editor of the Niepodległość (Independence) publication of the Józef Piłsudski Institute for Research in Modern History of Poland, and in 1936 director of the institute. From 1937 he lectured on the modern history of Poland at the University of Lwów.

== Invasions ==
Promoted to lieutenant colonel he retired in January 1939. After the German and Soviet invasions in September 1939, he was first attached to the Bureau of Propaganda at the Polish headquarters, and then to the Propaganda Department in Warsaw, during the siege of Warsaw. He was one of the top Polish commanders during that siege, working closely with Walerian Czuma and Stefan Starzyński and his brother Mieczysław. He issued daily radio speeches to the citizens of Warsaw. After the capitulation of the capital, he secured the rich collection of the Piłsudski Institute, transferring them to the Belweder Museum. Avoiding arrest after the Germans captured Warsaw, he and his family escaped first to Zakopane, and in 1940 to Hungary.

== Resistance activities ==
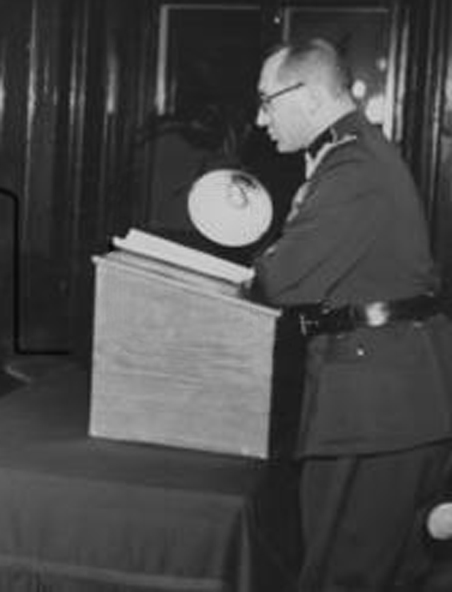
Major Wacław Lipiński in November 1938 at a lecture given at the Polish Academy of Sciences entitled "Józef Piłsudski as a writer".

Due to conflict between former followers of Józef Piłsudski (such as Lipiński) and followers of Władysław Sikorski, he was unable to join the Polish Army in the West. Instead, he became active in the Polish resistance. In 1942 he returned to occupied Poland, founding the Konwent Organizacji Niepodległościowych.

In 1944 he was arrested by the Nazis. After German forces were pushed back by the Soviets, he joined the anti-Soviet resistance. He founded the Stronnictwo Niezawisłości Narodowej and Komitet Porozumiewawczy Organizacji Demokratycznych Polski Podziemnej anti-communist movements. He was arrested by the communist secret police (Urząd Bezpieczeństwa) on 7 January 1947. Sentenced to death in a staged trial in 1948, the sentence was changed to a life sentence. He died in Wronki prison on 4 April 1949.

== Awards and decorations ==
- Silver Cross of Virtuti Militari
- Commander's Cross with Star of Polonia Restituta (posthumously, 10 November 2010)
- Cross of Independence (20 January 1931)
- Knight's Cross of Polonia Restituta
- Cross of Valour
- Golden Cross of Merit (twice 19 March 1937, 18 February 1939)
- Commemorative Medal for the War of 1918-1921
- Silver Academic Laurel
- Medal of the 10th Anniversary of Regaining Independence
- Wound Decoration

== Works ==
- Bajończycy i armja polska we Francji (Bayonians and the Polish army in France) (1929)
- Polityka zagraniczna Piłsudskiego i Becka (Foreign policy of Piłsudski and Beck) (1943)
- Walka zbrojna o niepodległość Polski w latach 1905-1918 (The armed struggle for the independence of Poland in 1905–1918) (1931)
- Wśród lwowskich orląt (Among Lwów eaglets)
- Dziennik: wrześniowa obrona Warszawy 1939 r. (Diary: September defense of Warsaw of 1939) (1989)
- Wielki Marszalek (The Great Marshal)

== See also ==
- List of Poles
