= Tadeusz Żuliński =

Tadeusz Żuliński may refer to:

- Tadeusz Żuliński (veterinarian) (1910–1967), Polish veterinarian, anatomicopathologist
- Tadeusz Żuliński (activist) (1889–1915), Polish activist
