= Mieczysław Ryś-Trojanowski =

Polish military commander

Mieczysław Ryś-Trojanowski (October 21, 1881 in Krośniewice – April 4, 1945 in Mauthausen-Gusen concentration camp) was a brigadier general (generał brygady) of Polish Army in the Second Polish Republic.

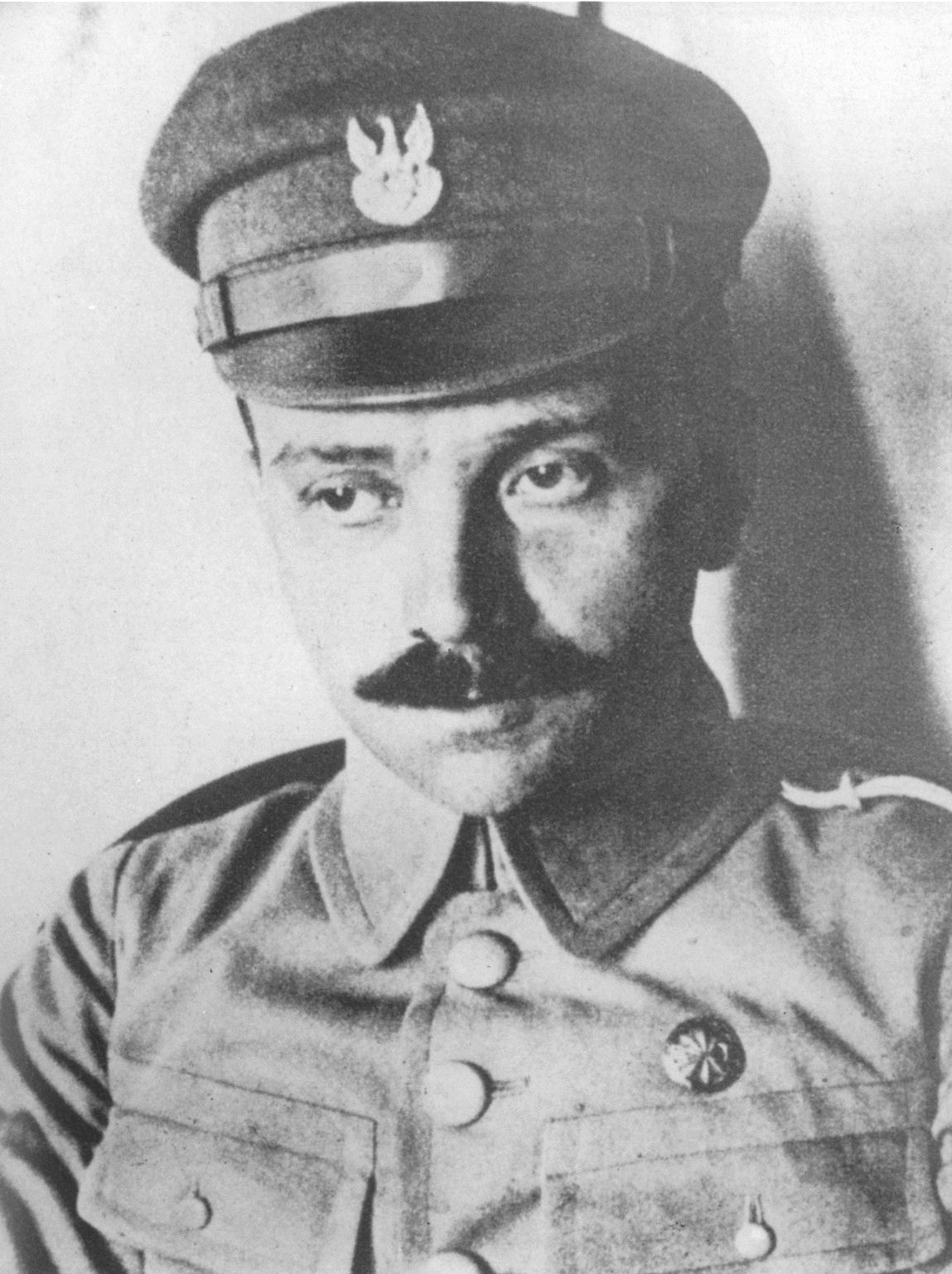
Mieczyslaw Ryś-Trojanowski

Ryś-Trojanowski was born on October 21, 1881, in Krośniewice, Kutno County. His was a patriotic Polish family: his father Szymon fought in the January Uprising. After graduating high school in Warsaw in 1902, Mieczyslaw went to Kraków, to study at Jagiellonian University. There he got in touch with patriotic organizations, which fought for the independence of the nation (see Partitions of Poland). In 1904 he joined the Polish Socialist Party.

Rys-Trojanowski participated in the Revolution of 1905, during which he was arrested on suspicion of attempting to kill Russian governor of Warsaw (see Congress Poland). In 1908 he moved to Austrian Galicia, where he became one of key members of the Union of Active Struggle, and organizer of local branches of the Riflemen's Association.

Promoted to the rank of officer, Ryś-Trojanowski fought in the Polish Legions in World War I, participating in all major battles of the unit, including the Battle of Kostiuchnowka. On November 1, 1916, he was named commandant of the 5th Legions' Infantry Regiment. In July 1917, after the so-called Oath Crisis, Rys-Trojanowski was imprisoned in Beniaminow. Later, he was kept in German camps at Rastatt, Holzminden and Werl.

In early November 1918, Ryś-Trojanowski became commandant of Chełm Military District and Chełm Infantry Regiment (later renamed into 35th Infantry Regiment), with which he fought in the Polish–Soviet War. On May 20, 1920, Ryś-Trojanowski was transferred to the 17th Infantry Brigade, and on September 2 of that year he was named commandant of the 9th Infantry Division, remaining in this post until late July 1926.

On December 1, 1924, President Stanislaw Wojciechowski upon request of Minister of Military Affairs Władysław Sikorski, promoted Rys-Trojanowski to the rank of General brygady. On July 31, 1926, President Ignacy Mościcki named Rys-Trojanowski commandant of Military District Nr 9 in Brzesc nad Bugiem. In 1935, he was transferred to Warsaw, becoming commandant of Military District Nr 1.

Rys-Trojanowski remained in this post until the Invasion of Poland (September 1, 1939). On September 4 he left Polish capital, tasked with creation of Prusy Army. Due to rapid German advance, this army was not created: Rys-Trojanowski involved himself with creation of Warszawa Army. He personally visited checkpoints on roads east of Warsaw, controlling the evacuation of civil servants, police officers and army personnel.

In mid-September, he helped with creation of Lublin Army, gathering soldiers scattered in northern Lesser Poland, Podlasie and eastern Mazovia. On September 20, after Soviet invasion of Poland, Rys-Trojanowski fled to Hungary, where he remained until March 1944. He was a very active member of Polish organizations in Hungary, cooperating both with Home Army and Hungarian headquarters.

On March 19, 1944, upon the invasion and occupation of Hungary by Nazi Germany, Rys-Trojanowski was arrested and sent to Mauthausen-Gusen concentration camp. He was murdered there on April 4, 1945.

== Promotions ==
- Captain: September 29, 1914,
- Major: June 15, 1915,
- Lieutenant colonel: 1918,
- Colonel: May 22, 1920,
- brigadier general (Generał brygady): December 1, 1924.

== Awards ==
- Silver Cross of the Virtuti Militari
- Commander's Cross with Star of the Order of Polonia Restituta,
- Cross of Independence with Swords.
- Golden Cross of Merit.
