= Józef Piłsudski Institute for Research in Modern History of Poland =

Institution in Warsaw, Poland

The Józef Piłsudski Institute for Research in Modern History of Poland (Polish: Instytut Józefa Piłsudskiego Poświęcony Badaniu Najnowszej Historii Polski) is an institution founded in Warsaw in 1923 to preserve and study the recent history of Poland.

== Early years ==
The origins of the Piłsudski Institute date back to March 1923, when colleagues and supporters of Józef Piłsudski (led by Col. Walery Sławek, Aleksander Dębski, Aleksander Prystor, Wacław Sieroszewski, Adam Skwarczyński, Michal Sokolnicki, Artur Śliwinski, Kazimierz Świtalski, Leon Wasilewski) collaborated on establishing the Institute for Research into the Modern Polish History (Instytut Badan Najnowszej Historii Polskiej). Formally registered with Poland's Ministry of the Interior on May 27, 1923, the institute's purpose (as described in its bylaws) was to collect and preserve historical records and accounts covering the period from the 1863 January Uprising through restoration of Poland's independence in 1918. The institute was tasked with historical research into collected materials, their publication, and cooperation with Polish authorities and interested associations (in Poland and abroad). Funding for the institute was to be provided by membership subscriptions, donations, legacies and private gifts, book sales and paid speeches.

Leon Wasilewski was the institute's first chairman. Activities focused on the creation of an archive of historic records and accounts that would be as complete and comprehensive as possible. To this end, on November 15, 1924, Col. Walery Sławek requested all Piłsudski "legionnaires" to protect and donate documents, memoirs, prints, appeals, proclamations, photographs, letters and hand-written notes from their time in service. Sławek's appeal made it clear that all records were deemed valuable in demonstrating legionnaires’ individual contributions and the broader challenges posed by opposition from foreign governments and within their own society. The response was swift and widespread, but ultimately hampered by the institute's lack of a home and post-World War I inflation.

== 1926 to 1936 ==
The autumn of 1926 saw a formal agreement between the Institute and the Polish army's Bureau of Military History (Wojskowe Biuro Historyczne, or WBH), represented by Brig. Gen. Julian Stachiewicz. Under the new agreement, the WBH provided the institute with office space, collected documents for safekeeping and promised the assistance of its archivists. In return, Stachiewicz was named to the institute's board as secretary-general. After his death in 1934, Stachiewicz was succeeded by Dr. Wacław Lipiński. The period between 1926 and 1936 proved to be one of dynamic growth for the institute; it developed its archive of materials and activities in the fields of publishing and scientific presentation.

Under the guidance of Józef Piłsudski the Institute published two volumes of his wartime memoirs, entitled Wspomnienia Legionowe; both volumes were edited by Janusz Jędrzejewicz. The publication (in 1927) of the second edition of Piłsudski's memoir, Rok 1920, was a commercial success; the revenue generated from the sales of the book enabled further (and expanded) publishing.

A classification of the archives proceeded after the Institute acquired office space from the WBH in 1926. The institute's index for 1927 includes the following subcollections:

- the Belvedere Archives (Archiwum Belwederskie), covering the period 1910–1918 and featuring papers pertaining to various aspects of Józef Piłsudski's life and activities; the PPS (Polish Socialist Party); Zwiazek Strzelecki (a pre-1914 paramilitary organization); the Polish National Organization and the Polish Legions
- Personal collection of Col. Walery Sławek
- Collections of Leon Wasilewski, Michał Sokolnicki and Franciszek Studziński
- Archives of the Polska Organizacja Wojskowa, or POW (Polish Military Organisation)

In 1929 the institute (chaired by Wasilewski) began publication of a quarterly magazine, Niepodległość (Independence), which later became a bimonthly. Coverage was devoted to recording all efforts and movements leading to Poland's independence, from the failed January 1863 Uprising to the restoration of the Polish state after World War I.

Between 1930 and 1933 the Institute issued eight volumes of Piłsudski's writings under the common title Pisma – Mowy – Rozkazy; the topical Polska Organizacja Wojskowa POW – Szkice i wspomnienia; Wojna 1920 roku by Gen. Lucjan Żeligowski and several works by Dr Felicjan Sławoj Składkowski (a military surgeon and early participant in Piłsudski's field campaigns).

== Reorganization following Piłsudski's death ==
After Marshal Piłsudski's death in 1935, the Institute decided to concentrate on documenting his life, emphasizing his political and military careers. With support from Marchall Smigły-Rydz (the new commander-in-chief of the Polish forces) and Gen. Tadeusz Kasprzycki, the Institute relocated to larger, new premises adjoining the army headquarters on Aleje Ujazdowskie in Warsaw. At that time (on 15 November 1935), it was also renamed The Józef Piłsudski Institute for Research in Modern History of Poland. On 17 December 1936, a government decree granted the Institute tax-exempt and educational status, measures of significant benefit in providing added impetus to the institute's mission and activities. Walery Sławek became the new president of the institute's board of directors, with Leon Wasilewski and Artur Śliwiński vice-presidents.

Between 1929 and 1939, several prominent members of the institute (Hipolit Śliwinski, Teodor Furgalski, Boguslaw Miedzinski, Roman Górecki and Wacław Jędrzejewicz) were instrumental in securing crucial historical records and documentation. Over the time the institute's collection grew to 40,000 volumes, prints, appeals, posters, newspapers and magazines, photographs and period memorabilia. In the final years before World War II, the institute also embarked on supplementing its archives by conducting extensive personal interviews with former legionnaires.

From 1932 to 1939 the Institute Archives were led by Wanda Kiedrzynska, Waclaw Gasiorowski and Adam Englert. The pressing need to secure historic records over this period and time dedicated to the institute's publishing ventures, however, cut into time dedicated to archival management. As a result, at the dawn of World War II on 1 September 1939 the institute's archives were not fully indexed.

== See also ==
- Józef Piłsudski Institute of America
- Polish Legions in world War I
