= Józef Piłsudski Institute =

Józef Piłsudski Institute can refer to:

- Józef Piłsudski Institute of America, New York
- Józef Piłsudski Institute for Research in Modern History of Poland, Warsaw (1923-1939)
- Józef Piłsudski Institute in London
