= Tadeusz Kasprzycki =

Polish general (1891–1978)

Major general Tadeusz Kasprzycki
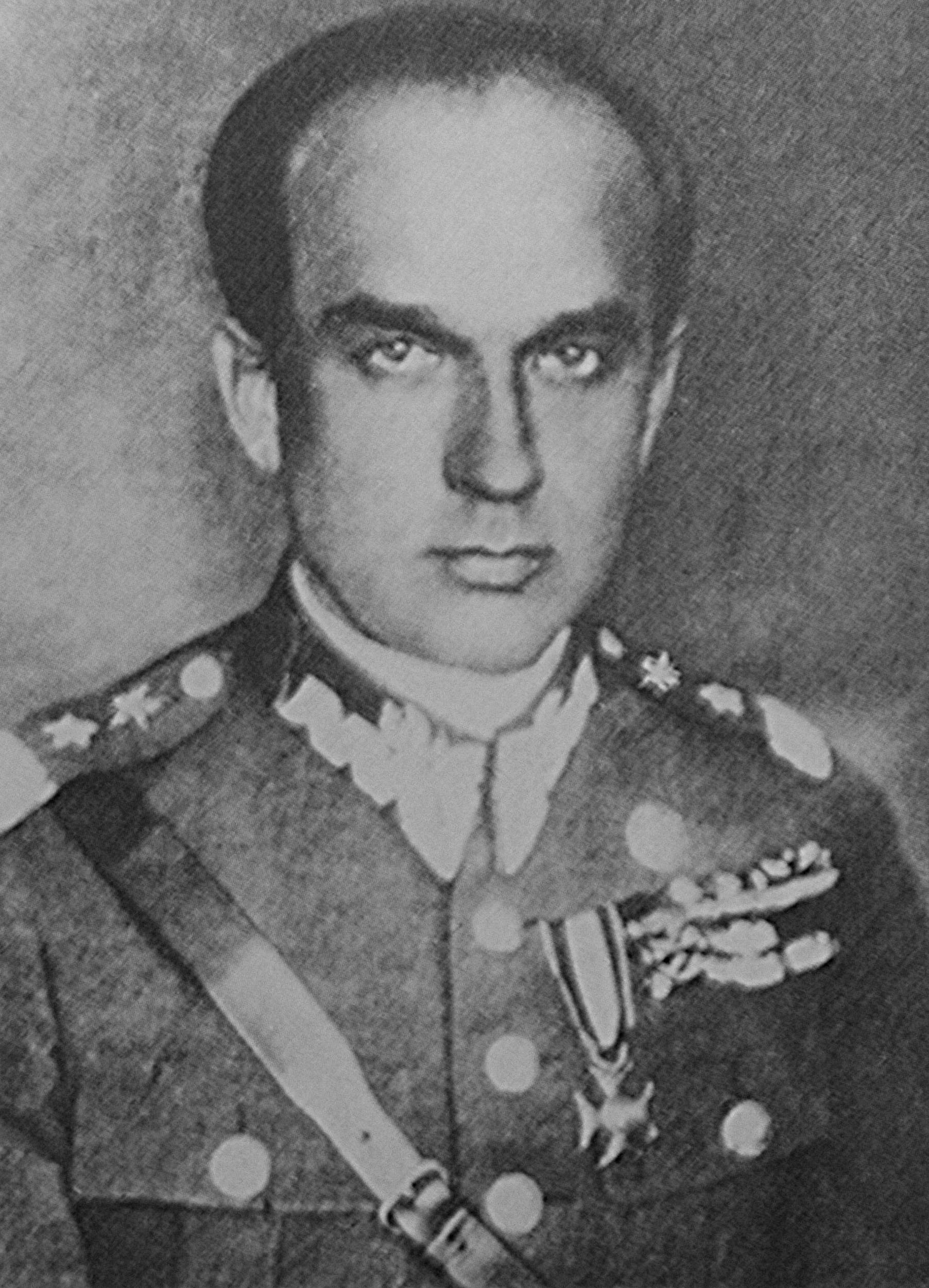

Minister of Military Affairs
- In office 12 May 1935 – 7 November 1939
- President: Ignacy Mościcki
- Preceded by: Józef Piłsudski
- Succeeded by: Władysław Sikorski

Personal details
- Born: 16 January 1891 Warsaw, Congress Poland
- Died: 4 December 1978 (aged 87) Montreal, Quebec, Canada
- Education: École Militaire

Military service
- Allegiance: Austria-Hungary (1914–1917); Second Polish Republic (1918–1939)
- Branch/service: Polish Legions; Polish Armed Forces
- Years of service: 1914–1939
- Rank: Major general
- Commands: 19th Infantry Division
- Battles/wars: First World War; Polish-Soviet War; Second World War: Invasion of Poland

Tadeusz Adam Kasprzycki (16 January 1891 – 4 December 1978) was a member of the Polish Legions in First World War, major general of the Polish Armed Forces from 1929 and Minister of Military Affairs of Poland from 1935 to 1939. He commanded the 12th Infantry Division from 1927 to 1931.

In 1939 he signed the Franco-Polish Military Alliance. Later, he was interned in Romania after the evacuation of the Polish government following Nazi Germany's invasion of Poland and was only released in 1945. After the end of the Second World War, he emigrated to Canada.

== Biography ==
Kasprzycki graduated from General Paweł Chrzanowski High School in Warsaw, after which he studied social studies and law at the Sorbonne and Geneva University. In the early 1910s, he joined the Union of Active Struggle and the Riflemen's Association. Before the outbreak of World War I, he graduated from Riflemen's Officer Academy in Stróże near Limanowa.

In August 1914, Kasprzycki was named commander of the First Cadre Company. Later on, he was transferred to the headquarters of the 1st Brigade, Polish Legions. In the autumn of 1914, he joined Polish Military Organisation, helping to create its structures in the areas of Lublin and Warsaw. In 1917, Kasprzycki created the Association of Polish Military Organizations (Związek Polskich Organizacji Wojskowych).

On 3 December 1918 Kasprzycki became a member of Józef Piłsudski's office. In 1919, he went to Paris, to study at École Militaire in Paris. After returning to Poland (1921) he took several posts in the Polish Armed Forces headquarters. In March 1927, he was appointed the commander of the 19th Infantry Division (Poland), stationed in Wilno. At the same time, he was Polish delegate to the Military Commission of the League of Nations. On 1 January 1929 Kasprzycki was promoted to the rank of Brigadier general, and in July 1931, he became Deputy Minister of Military Affairs.

On 12 May 1935, after the death of Józef Piłsudski, Kasprzycki was named Minister of Military Affairs by the President of Poland and remained in this post until 30 September 1939. On 19 March 1936 he was promoted to Divisional general.

Apart from military activities, Kasprzycki was a member of several civilian organizations. In 1936, he was appointed the chairman of Main Committee of Mountain Congress, which took place in August of that year in Sanok. In December 1937, he was named chairman of Polish Association of Research Expeditions, and due to his efforts, a road along the ridge of Gubałówka was built. Furthermore, he was a member of the Association of Development of Eastern Provinces.

In the spring of 1939, Kasprzycki's wife Maria née Strychalska committed suicide, and his son, who at that time was a high school student, broke all relations with the father. The probable cause of these events was Kasprzycki's affair with actress Zofia Kajzerówna.

During the Polish September Campaign, Kasprzycki, together with the government of Poland, was evacuated to Romania, where he was interned. In 1944 he arrived in Great Britain via Turkey. He wanted to join Polish Armed Forces in the West, but his application was rejected by Władysław Sikorski, who claimed that Kasprzycki was one of the people directly responsible for Polish defeat in September 1939. In 1954 he moved to Canada.

== Honours and awards ==
- Silver Cross of the Order of Virtuti Militari
- Cross of Independence
- Commander's Cross of the Order of Polonia Restituta
- Cross of Valour - three times
- Gold Cross of Merit
- Mark officers "Parasol"
- Order of the Cross of the Eagle, Class I (Estonia, 1938)
- Order of Saint Sava
