= Marian Kukiel =

Polish major general, historian and social and political activist

Marian Włodzimierz Kukiel
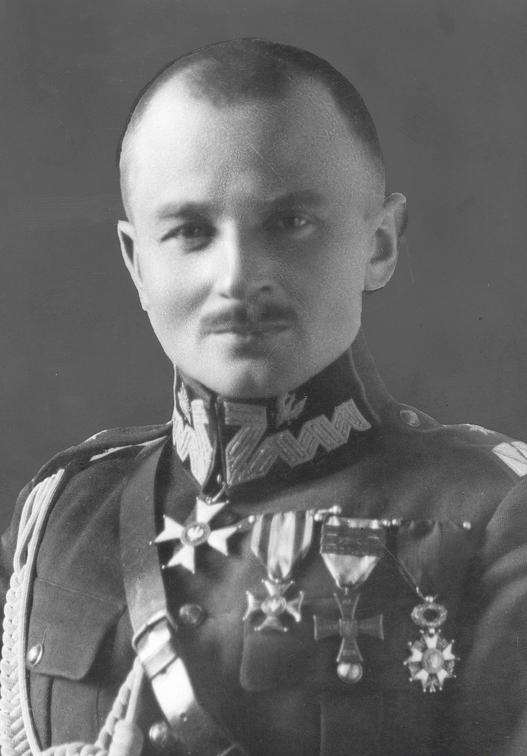
- Marian Kukiel (circa. 1925/1926)
- Born: 15 May 1885; Dąbrowa Tarnowska, Austria-Hungary (now Poland)
- Died: 15 August 1973 (aged 88); London, United Kingdom
- Burial place: Kensal Green Cemetery
- Military career
- Allegiance: Polish government-in-exile
- Branch: Austro-Hungarian Army Polish Legions Polish Army Polish Armed Forces in the West
- Service years: 1914–1973
- Rank: Major general
- Conflicts: World War I Polish–Soviet War; World War II
- Awards: Virtuti Militari (Silver Cross); Polonia Restituta (Commander's Cross); Several others (see below)
- Other work: Minister of National Defence of the Polish government-in-exile (1942-1944); Chairman of the Polish Institute and Sikorski Museum (1951-c.1965)

Marian Włodzimierz Kukiel (pseudonyms: Marek Kąkol, Stach Zawierucha; 15 May 1885 - 15 August 1973) was a Polish major general, historian, social and political activist.

One of the founders of Związek Walki Czynnej in 1908 and prominent member of Związek Strzelecki; he fought in the Polish Legions in First World War. Kukiel served from 1919 until 1920 as Deputy Head of Section III, Polish General Staff and took part in the Polish-Soviet War. Then in 1920 he became the Commanding Officer of the 20th Brigade and Head of Section III. From 1923 until 1925 he served as General Officer Commanding the 13th Infantry Division; after Piłsudski's May Coup he entered the reserves. From 1927 he was a professor of military history at Jagiellonian University. Since 1932 he became a member of PAU. From 1930 until 1939 he was director of the Czartoryski Museum in Kraków.

In 1939 he took part in the defence of Lwów. From 1939 until 1940 he was Vice-Minister of War of the Polish Government in Exile in London. From 1940 until 1942 General Officer Commanding the 1st Polish Corps based in Coatbridge Scotland, and since 1943 Minister of War of the Government in Exile. From 1945 until 1973 professor of the Polish University in Exile. From 1946 until 1973 director of the Polish History Institute in London. From 1951 to 1966 member of the Sikorski Institute in London.

He died in London in 1973 aged eighty-eight after sustaining injuries in a car accident and was buried at Kensal Green Cemetery.

== Awards ==
- Poland:
  - Silver Cross of the Virtuti Militari (1922)
  - Commander's Cross of the Order of Polonia Restituta (1922)
  - Cross of Valour, four times
  - Gold Cross of Merit with Swords
- Belgium:
  - Grand Officer of the Order of the Crown
- France:
  - Knight of the Legion of Honour
  - Knight of the Order of Academic Palms
- United Kingdom:
  - Honorary Knight Commander of the Order of the Bath (1942)
- Kingdom of Yugoslavia:
  - Commander of the Order of the White Eagle

== Works ==
- Dzieje wojska polskiego w dobie napoleońskiej 1795-1815 (t. 1-2 1918-20)
- Zarys historii wojskowości w Polsce (t. 1-2 1921, published in 1949)
- Wojna roku 1812 (t. 1-2 1937)
- Dzieje Polski porozbiorowej 1795-1921 (1961)
