= Tadeusz Żuliński (activist) =

Polish activist

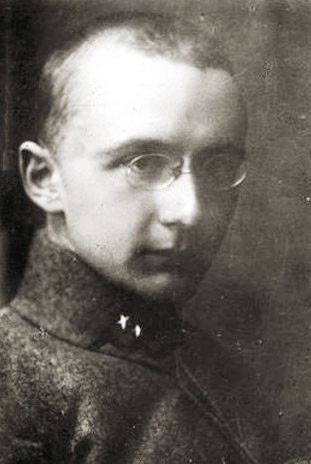
Tadeusz Józef Żuliński

Tadeusz Żuliński (28 May 1889, Lwow – 5 November 1915, Kamieniucha), pseudonym Roman Barski, was an activist, member of Polska Partia Socjalistyczna - Frakcja Rewolucyjna and Związek Walki Czynnej (from 1908), Związek Strzelecki (from 1910). He was an organiser and commander of Polish Military Organisation (1914–1915).
