= 1st Uhlans Regiment of Polish Legions =

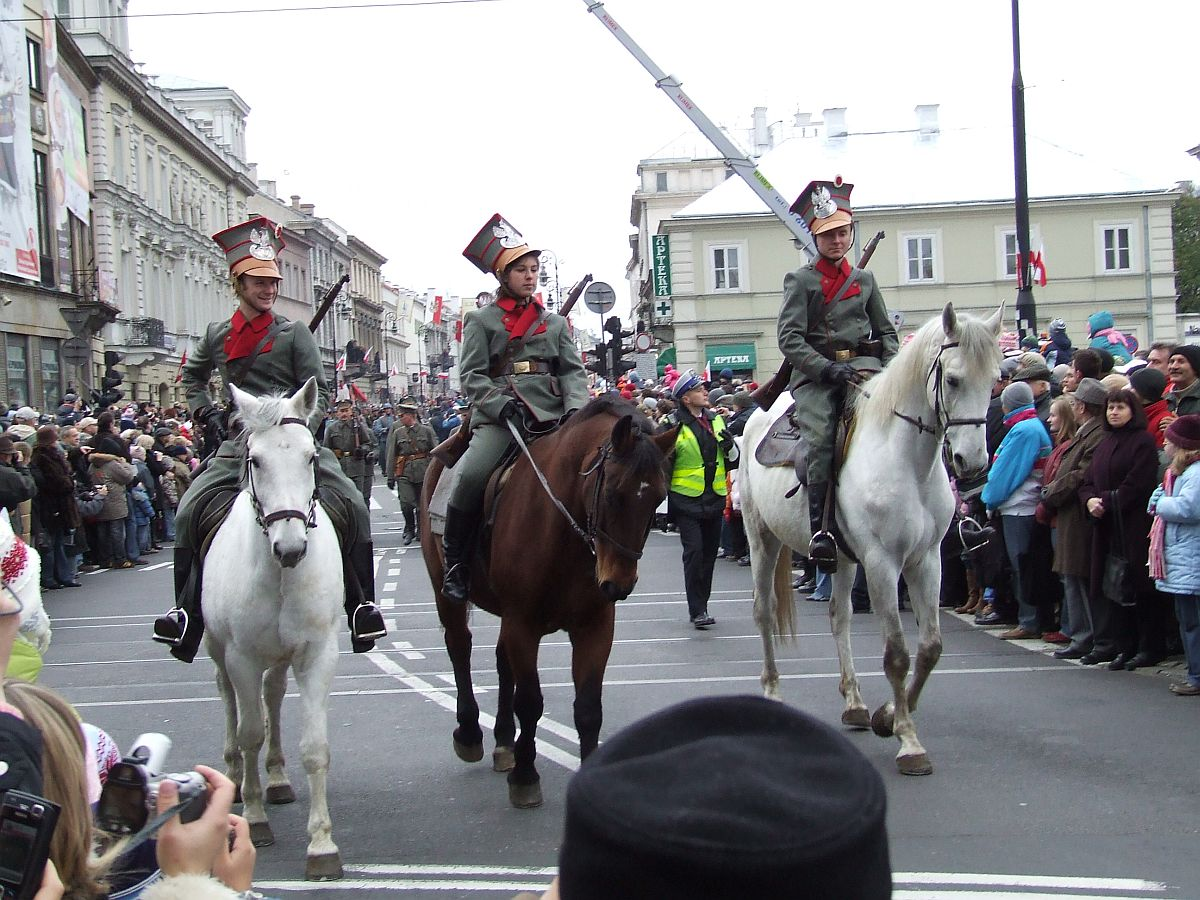
Reconstruction of the Uhlan Regiment of Polish Legions during celebration of Independence Day in Warsaw

The 1st Uhlans Regiment of Polish Legions was a cavalry unit of the Polish Legions during World War I. Members of the unit were named "Beliniaki", after their original leader Władysław Zygmunt Belina-Prażmowski.

The regiment was created on August 13, 1914, from a squadron composed of 140 soldiers formed by Belina-Prażmowski. The unit was based on The Seven Lancers of Belina, the vanguard of the march of the First Cadre Company on August 6, 1914. The cavalry unit was composed of Janusz Głuchowski "Janusz", Antoni Jabłoński "Zdzisław", Zygmunt Karol Karwacki "Stanisław Bończa", Stefan Kulesza "Hanka", Stanisław Skotnicki "Grzmot", and Ludwik Kmicic-Skrzyński "Kmicic" under Prażmowski's command.

In February and March 1917, the regiment organized and implemented officer training (for officers and non-commissioned officers) and administrative courses.

On August 10, 1917, the leader of the Polish Legions handed over the command of the regiment to captain Albert Kordecki of the 2nd Cavalry Regiment.

== Beliniaks ==
Command

- cavalry major Juliusz Ostoja-Zagórski

The commanding staff in 1917 r.

- commander of the regiment– major Władysław Belina-Prażmowski
- squadron commander – cpt. Janusz Głuchowski (since 1 Jan 1915)
- squadron commander – porucznik Jerzy Pytlewski (since 1 June 1915)

COs

- Konstanty Abłamowicz
- Stanisław Bietkowski
- Tadeusz Bietkowski
- Wacław Budzyński
- Bolesław Wieniawa-Długoszowski
- Stanisław Korczak
- Tadeusz Korniłowicz
- Włodzimierz Nieprzewski
- Zygmunt Piasecki
- Zygmunt Młot-Przepałkowski
- Kazimierz Stamirowski
- Leon Strzelecki
- Mariusz Zaruski
- Wacław Calewski
- Eugeniusz Chrościcki
- Wojciech Bucior
- Tadeusz Ścibor-Rylski
- Tadeusz Faliszewski
- Ksawery Święcicki
- Janusz Żuławski
- regiment medic Ksawery Maszadr

NCOs and Ułans

- Marian Józef Czerkawski
- corp. Stanisław Gąssowski
- Franciszek Koziej
- sr. ułan Jan Władysław Lemański
- wachtmeister Emil Franciszek Mecnarowski
- Jan Maria Romański
- plutonowy Leon Trojanowski

== Legacy ==
From this regiment, three further were formed, namely:

- 1 Pułk Szwoleżerów Józefa Piłsudskiego.
- 7 Pułk Ułanów Lubelskich im. gen. Kazimierza Sosnkowskiego.
- 11 Pułk Ułanów Legionowych im. marszałka Edwarda Śmigłego-Rydza.

== Medal ==
The medal, designed by corporal Kajetan Stanowicz, was instated on 5 November 1916. It has a round shield of a 41 to 45mm diameter with a twisted-rope-like edge. On it is engraved the monogram "1PU" against the background of an Uhlan hat and two dates: "II VII 1914", the date on which Belina's patrol left Galicia for the kingdom; and "V XI 1916", the day the medal was instituted. The medal was approved by the Minister of Military Affairs on 5 May 1920. Bearing it required being part of the regiment for at least a year. All in all, 800 medals were issued.

== Bibliography ==
- "Księga jazdy polskiej”: pod protektoratem marsz. Edwarda Śmigłego–Rydza. Warszawa 1936. Reprint: Wydawnictwo Bellona Warszawa 1993
