= Władysław Belina-Prażmowski =

Polish politician & colonel (1888–1938)

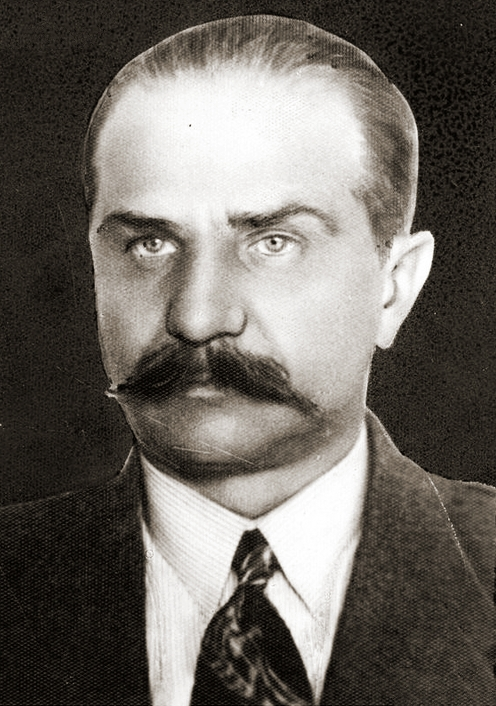
- Władysław Belina-Prażmowski in 1936

Mayor of Kraków
- In office 16 July 1931 – 11 February 1933
- Preceded by: Karol Rolle
- Succeeded by: Mieczysław Kaplicki

Voivode of Lwów
- In office 31 January 1933 – 14 April 1937
- Preceded by: Józef Rożniecki
- Succeeded by: Alfred Biłyk

Personal details
- Born: 13 May 1888 Ruszkowiec, Congress Poland, Russian Empire (today Poland)
- Died: 13 October 1938 (aged 50) Venice, Kingdom of Italy
- Awards

Military service
- Allegiance: Austro-Hungary; Second Polish Republic
- Branch/service: Polish Legions; Polish Army
- Years of service: 1914–1938
- Rank: Pułkownik (Colonel)
- Battles/wars: First World War; Polish–Ukrainian War; Polish–Soviet War

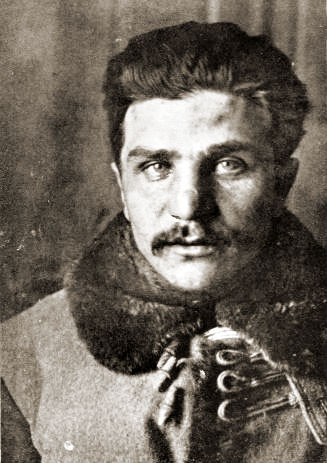
Władysław Belina-Prażmowski

Władysław Zygmunt Belina-Prażmowski (3 May 1888 in Ruszkowiec – 13 October 1938 in Venice), was a Polish cavalryman, colonel and politician.

== Biography ==
He was a member of Związek Walki Czynnej since 1909, later Związek Strzelecki. Student of Lwów Politechnic in 1919–1913.

Serving under Józef Piłsudski, he became one of the first Polish soldiers - formally under Austrian command - who entered Russian-held Polish territory during the First World War. Member of Polish Legions, organizer and commander of 1st Regiment of Polish Uhlans and later 1st Brigade of Polish Uhlans.
Later he fought in the Polish-Ukrainian War (1918–1919) and Polish-Soviet War (1919–1921). In April 1919 his troops were instrumental in taking Wilno. Piłsudski would declare Belina's cavalry action a most exquisite military action carried out by Polish cavalry in this war.

From 1929 he lived in Kraków and retired from the military. In 1931-1933 he was a mayor of Kraków and from 1933 to 1937, voivode of Lwów. In 1938 he retired from public work due to worsening health; he died later that year, aged fifty.

== Honours and awards ==
- Gold Cross of the Order of Virtuti Militari
- Commander's Cross of the Order of Polonia Restituta
- Cross of Valour - five times
- Officers' badge "Parasol"
- Order of the Cross of the Eagle, Class II (Estonia, 1935)

== See also ==
- The Seven Lancers of Belina : a mounted reconnaissance group of the Riflemen's Association.
