= First Cadre Company =

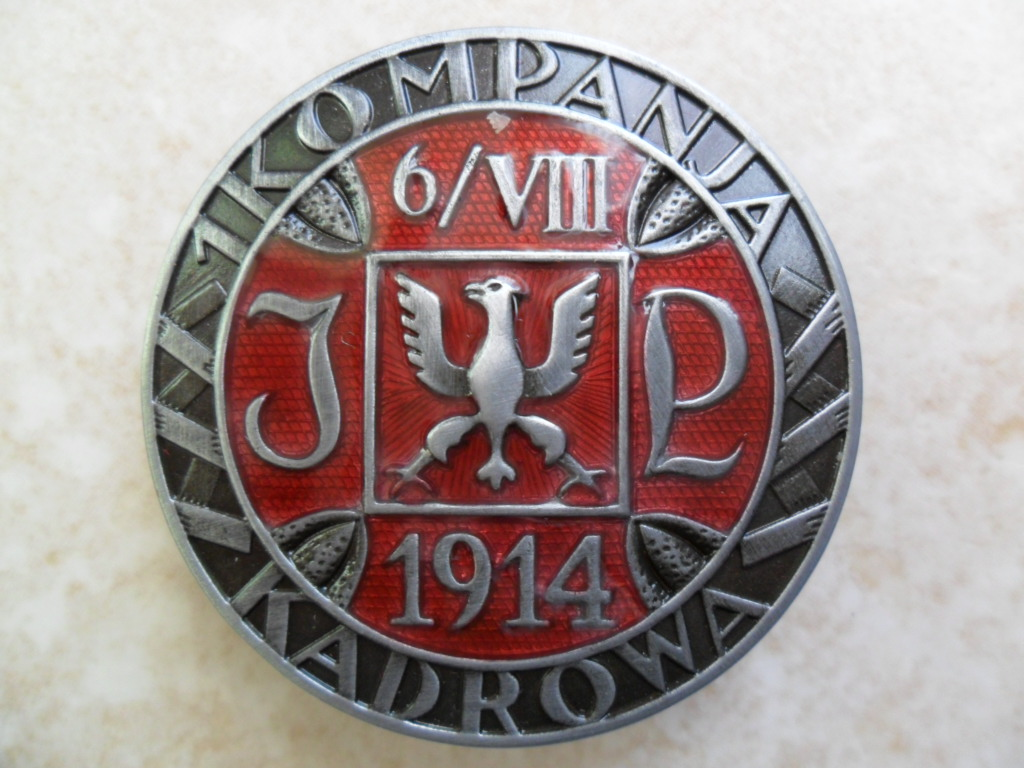
- Active: August 1914
- Disbanded: 16–27 August 1914
- Country: Austro-Hungarian Empire
- Branch: Austro-Hungarian Army
- Type: Infantry & Cavalry
- Size: 145-168
- Garrison/HQ: Garnizon Kraków
- March: Kadrówka
- Engagements: World War I

Commanders
- Founder: Józef Piłsudski
- Initial Commander: Tadeusz Kasprzycki
- Final Commander: Kazimierz Jan Piątek

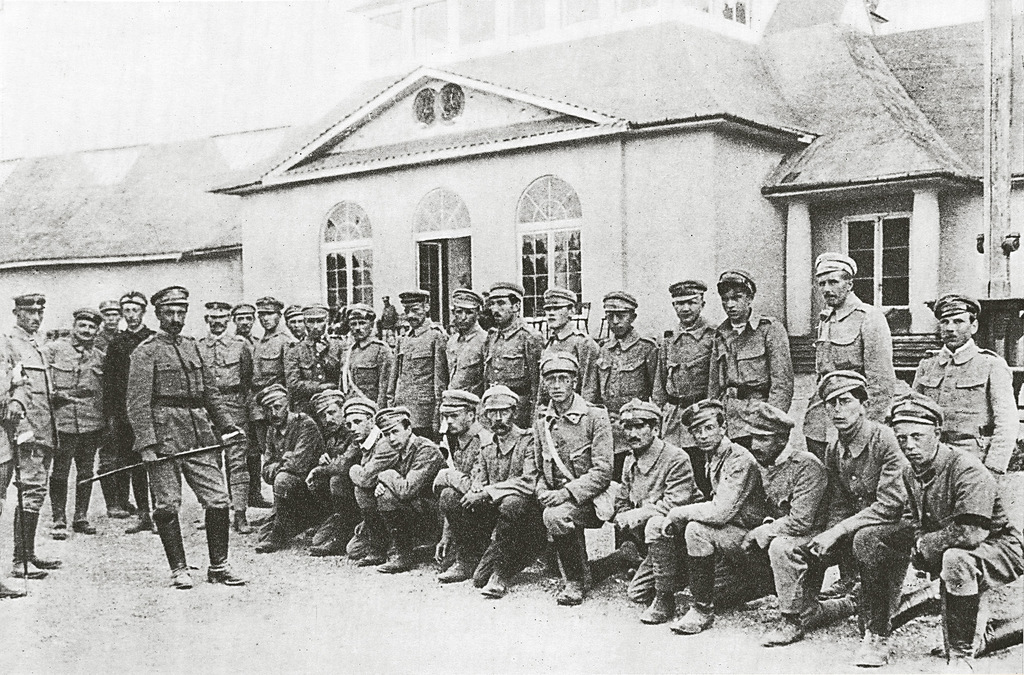
The First Cadre in Oleandry, Kraków. 1914.

The First Cadre Company (Polish: Pierwsza Kompania Kadrowa) was a Polish military formation created in the Austro-Hungarian Army at the outbreak of World War I. The company was founded by Józef Piłsudski on 3 August 1914 in Kraków. It was the predecessor of the Polish Legions, and formed the core of the Polish Legions' First Brigade during World War I.

== History ==
The First Cadre Company came into formation when the Riflemen's Association and the Polish Rifle Squads were mobilized between 29 July and 2 August 1914 by Józef Piłsudski. At 6 p.m. on 3 August the First Cadre was formally created in the Oleandry district of Kraków (just east of Jordan Park). On 4 and 5 August the Cadre underwent re-organization while the soldiers received short yet extensive training. Tadeusz Kasprzycki was appointed commander. The Cadre consisted of four platoons, each consisting of four groups of 10 soldiers each. The exact number of soldiers varies according to the source, but estimates generally put it at somewhere between 145 and 168 soldiers, which included the notable The Seven Lancers of Belina.

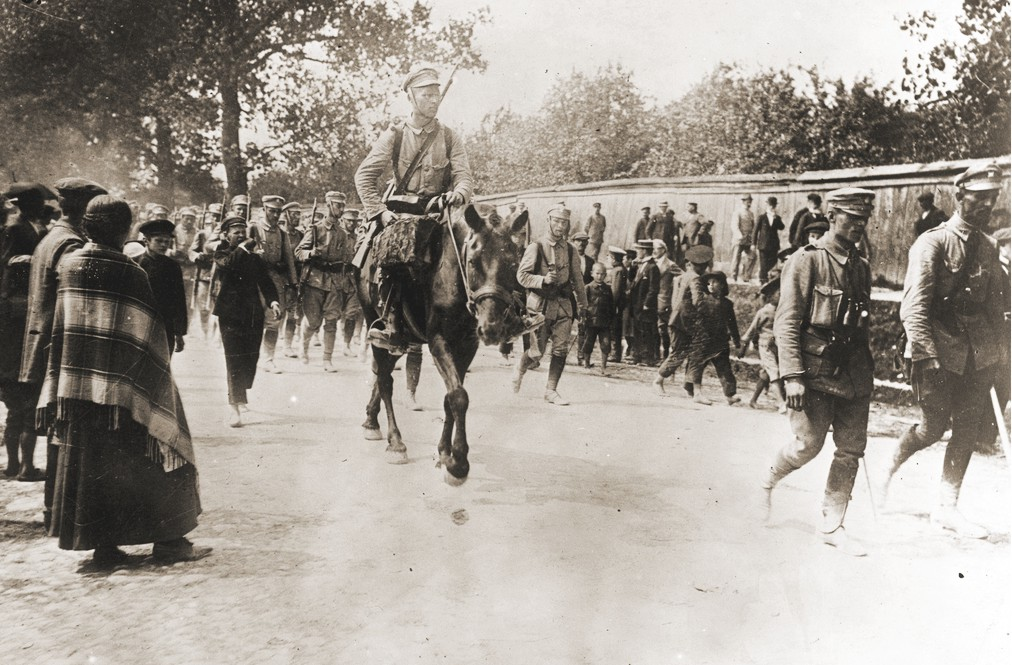
The First Cadre after having occupied Kielce. Kielce, August 1914.

On 6 August 1914 the Austro-Hungarian Empire declared war on the Russian Empire. At a quarter to three on the morning of that day, the First Cadre set out for the Austro-Hungarian — Russian border. It crossed into Tsarist Poland at the border village of Michałowice. On 8 August commander Kasprzycki was transferred to the General Command and replaced by Kazimierz Jan Piątek. The first eight volunteers were accepted into the Cadre's ranks on the same day. On 12 August the First Cadre participated in the capture of Kielce in full battalion strength alongside the Second Company, led by Stanisław Tessaro, and the Third Company, led by Wacław Scaevola-Wieczorkiewicz. The First Cadre then attempted to break through the Russian lines and continue north. The objective was to capture Warsaw in hope of setting off an uprising in Tsarist Poland against the Russian authorities. However, the Russians checked the First Cadre just outside Kielce on 13 August, which resulted in the Cadre's retreat from Kielce to Kraków.

Between 16 and 27 August, the First Cadre was reorganized and transformed into the Polish Legions. It is difficult to set an exact date for the transformation — the Supreme National Committee called for the formation of the Polish Legions on 16 August, Józef Piłsudski called for its formation on 22 August, and the Austrian government officially agreed to its formation on 27 August. All three dates can be found simultaneously representing both the disbandment of the First Cadre and the formation of the Polish Legions, depending on the source. However the First Cadre Company formed the core of the First Brigade of the Polish Legions by mid-December 1914.

== See also ==
- Polish Legions
- 1st Brigade, Polish Legions
- Seven Lancers of Belina

== Bibliography ==
- Majchrowski, Jacek M. (2014). Pierwsza Kompania Kadrowa. Portret oddziału (in Polish). Kraków: Księgarnia Akademicka. ISBN 9788376384627.
- Judym-Englert, Adam, ed. (1934). "Pierwsza Kompania Kadrowa". 6 sierpień: 1914 - 1934 (in Polish). Warsaw: Zarząd Główny Związku Legjonistów Polskich.
- Majchrowski, Jacek M. (1994). "Wojskowe kariery kadrowiaków". Wojskowy Przegląd Historyczny (in Polish). 3 (149). Wojskowy Instytut Historyczny: 78–108.
- Misiewicz, Michał (1992). "Belina i 1 kompania kadrowa". Wojskowy Przegląd Historyczny (in Polish). 3 (141). Wojskowy Instytut Historyczny: 128–137.
