= Polish Military Organisation =

- Polska Organizacja Wojskowa (POW)
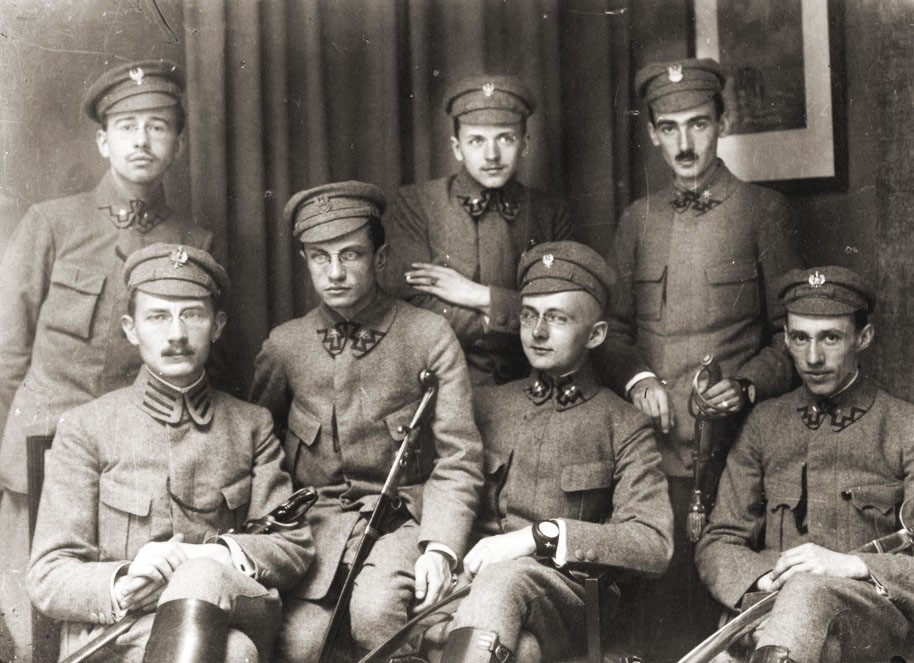
- Supreme command of the PMO in 1914
- Active: 1914–1921
- Country: Congress Poland; Poland
- Allegiance: Polish Independence Movement
- Type: Paramilitary
- Role: Armed struggle against the Imperial Russian Army
- Size: c. 30,000 (1918)

Commanders
- Chief Commandant: Józef Piłsudski (1914–1917); Edward Śmigły-Rydz (1917–1918)
- Notable commanders: Tadeusz Żuliński Michał Żymierski; Tadeusz Kasprzycki

Insignia
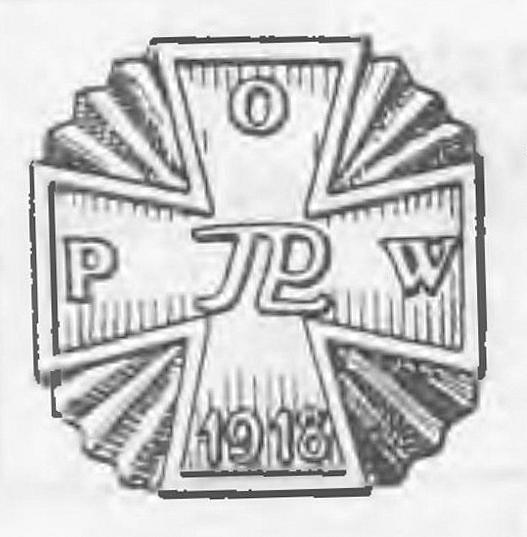
- Emblem of the Polish Military Organisation

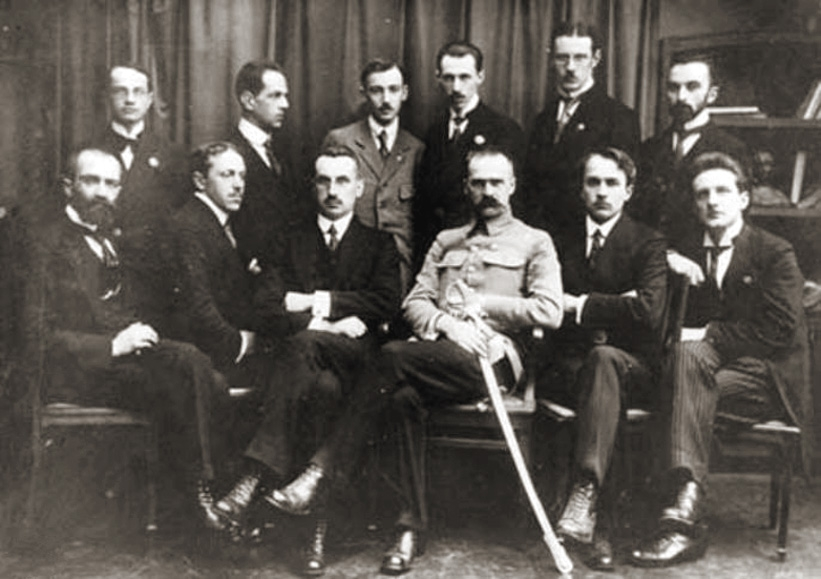
The Supreme Command of Polish Military Organisation, 1917

The Polish Military Organisation, PMO (Polish: Polska Organizacja Wojskowa, POW) was a secret military organization that was formed during World War I (1914–1918). Józef Piłsudski founded the group in August 1914. It adopted the name POW in November 1914 and aimed to gather intelligence and to sabotage the enemies of the Polish people. Piłsudski used it to act independently from his cautious Austro-Hungarian supporters, and it became an important, if somewhat lesser known, counterpart to the Polish Legions. Its targets included the Russian Empire in the early phase of the war and the German Empire later. Its membership rose from a few hundred in 1914 to over 30,000 in 1918.

== History ==
=== Intelligence and training ===
The Polish Military Organization (PMO) can be traced to formations of August 1914 or even earlier, but it was officially founded in November 1914 as a merger of two previously existing youth para-military organisations: the Polish Rifle Squads and the Riflemen's Association. Active in the Russian-held Kingdom of Poland, the PMO served as the intelligence and sabotage arm of Piłsudski's Polish Legions. In fact, many members of the illegal and secret PMO were at the same time soldiers of the Austro-Hungarian-backed Polish Legions. The PMO was commanded militarily by Piłsudski himself, and the political command was a secret "A" Convent, headed by Jędrzej Moraczewski.

Initially active only in Central Poland, the PMO units in time were formed in all parts of the former Polish–Lithuanian Commonwealth, including what is now Lithuania, Belarus, Ukraine and Russia. It was mainly preoccupied with intelligence and sabotage, as well as military training of its members and the acquisition of arms from various armies fighting on Polish soil. The PMO members were seen as the core of the future Polish Army after Poland had regained its independence.

After most of Poland was occupied by the Central Powers in 1915, the PMO became semilegal and unofficially supported by the German army, which saw it as a useful source of information on Russia and a useful reservoir of skilled officers. However, in July 1917, after the Oath Crisis in the Polish Legions and the arrest of Piłsudski, the PMO returned to the underground and started covert operations against German and Austrian garrisons and supply lines. In place of Piłsudski, who was sent to a German prison in the fortress in Magdeburg, the commander of the PMO became his friend Edward Rydz-Śmigły, who was also a future Marshal of Poland.

=== Sabotage and open fight ===
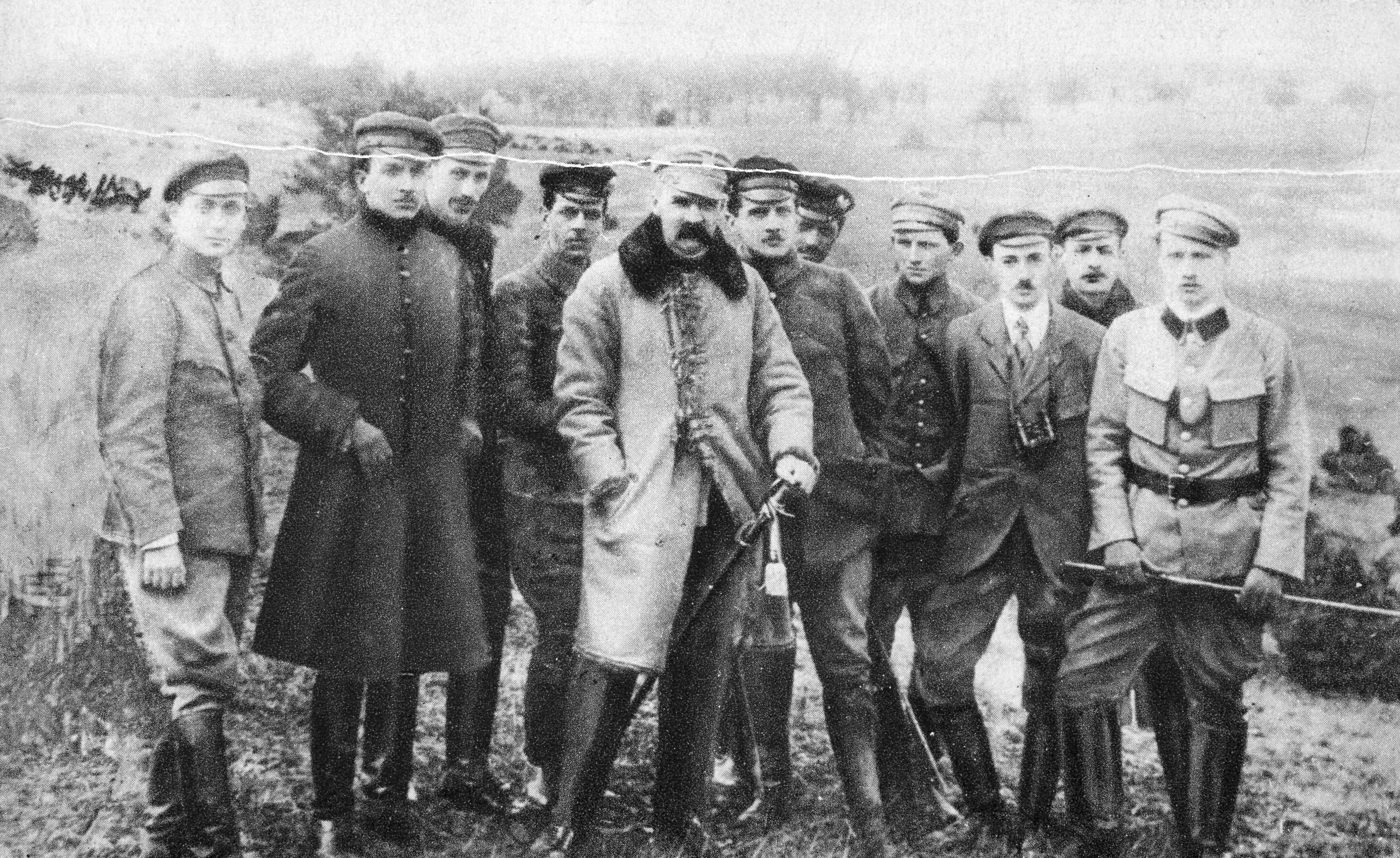
Józef Piłsudski with the Supreme Command of Polish Military Organisation in 1917

With the collapse of the Central Powers during the final stages of the war, the PMO command decided to take an active part in the war and went out into the open. In October and November 1918, the revolutions in Germany and Austria-Hungary made the Ober Ost army collapse. The German units were struck by mass desertions of soldiers, who simply left their posts and headed for their homes.

The main tasks of the PMO was then to disarm the withdrawing soldiers and to escort them to Germany. The campaign was successful and gave the newly born Polish state a large quantity of arms and military equipment. By mid-November, most of garrisons in Galicia surrendered to the PMO members, and the region became controlled by Poland. The PMO members continued the disarming actions in the former Congress Kingdom as well. Finally, the PMO was the core of Polish defences of the city of Lwów in the Battle of Lwów against the attacking forces of the West Ukrainian People's Republic (roughly 400 members in the initial phase of the struggle). In December 1918, all members of the PMO were conscripted into the newly reborn Polish Army.

=== Later struggles ===
Contrary to the rest of units, the PMO in Ukraine (most notably, the areas controlled by the Western Ukrainian government and or the Kiev-based Directorate and Hetmanate) remained active after the Polish withdrawal from Kiev in July 1920.

In February 1918, a similar organisation was formed in the German-held Greater Poland. It was modelled after the original PMO and maintained contacts with its predecessor. It assumed the name of Polish Military Organisation of the Prussian Partition, and its main aims were to liberate the region and to attach it to Poland. The members of the PMO became the core of the Greater Polish Army during the Greater Poland Uprising of 1918–1919. After the uprising had succeeded, the PMO members were also drafted into the Polish Army, together with other military units fighting in the uprising.

In February 1919, the Polish Military Organization of Upper Silesia was also formed. It had similar tasks to its Greater Polish counterpart and became the core of the Silesian Uprisings of 1919–1921. The members of the PMO members were then demobilised or integrated into the Polish Army or the Polish Intelligence Services.

=== In Lithuania ===
In Lithuania, the PMO was organizing a secret plot to overthrow the legal government of Lithuania and to replace it with one more friendly towards Poland. The coup was planned for August 1919, but it was uncovered by the State Security Department of Lithuania. Mass arrests followed and eliminated the possibility of a coup d'état.

From the documents that were stolen in its headquarters safe in Vilnius and given to Prime Minister of Lithuania Augustinas Voldemaras, it is clear that the plot had been directed by Piłsudski himself. A PMO-led uprising occurred in the Sejny region, which was controlled by Lithuanian forces, and led to Polish forces gaining control of that disputed territory.

=== Influence in Soviet Union ===
Although the PMO was disbanded in 1921, Soviet authorities claimed that it continued to exist. During the Great Purge from 1936 to 1938 and as early as 1933, many people of Polish nationality were charged with membership in it, which was illegal. See Polish Operation of the NKVD for the circumstances and NKVD Order No. 00485 in particular.

== Commanders ==
- from August 1914 K. Rybasiewicz,
- from October 1914 ppor. Tadeusz Żuliński,
- from August 1915 mjr Michał Żymierski,
- from October 1915 mjr Tadeusz Kasprzycki
