= Tadeusz Żuliński (veterinarian) =

Polish doctor

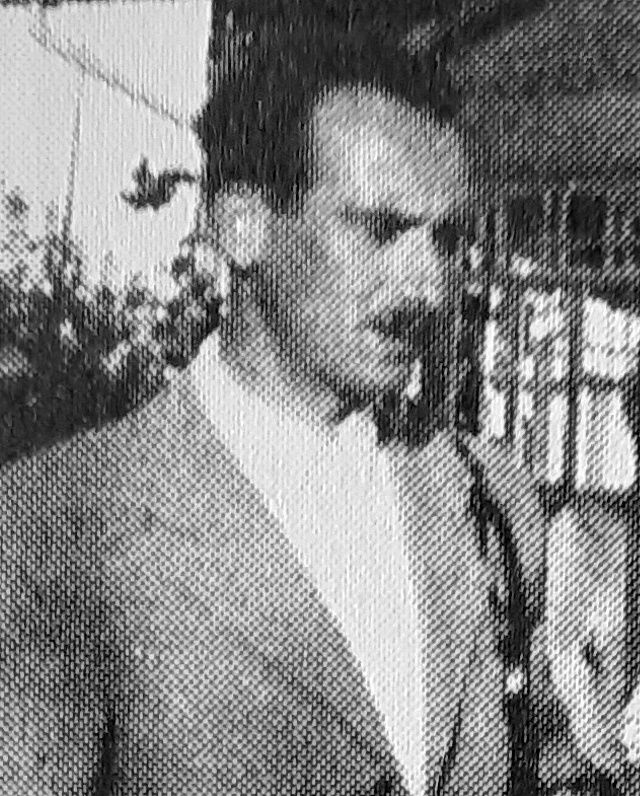

Tadeusz Kazimierz Żuliński (2 April 1910 in Rzeszów – 11 March 1967 in Lublin) was a Polish veterinarian and anatomic pathologist. He was a professor of Maria Curie-Skłodowska University and Wyższa Szkoła Rolnicza in Lublin. He was an organizer of Zakład Anatomii Patologiczne at Państwowy Instytut Weterynaryjny - Państwowy Instytut Badawczy in Puławy.

== Works ==
- Diagnostyka sekcyjna chorób zwierząt domowych
