= Seven Lancers of Belina =

The Seven Lancers of Belina, also called Belina’s Seven and The Seven Uhlans (Polish: Ulanska siodemka) was a name given to a mounted reconnaissance group of the Riflemen's Association. On August 2, 1914, upon order of Józef Piłsudski, the seven uhlans crossed the border between Austrian Galicia and Congress Poland, on a mission to gather information about Russian forces in the area of Miechów and Jędrzejów. Members of the group would later become elite of the cavalry forces of the Second Polish Republic (see also Polish cavalry).

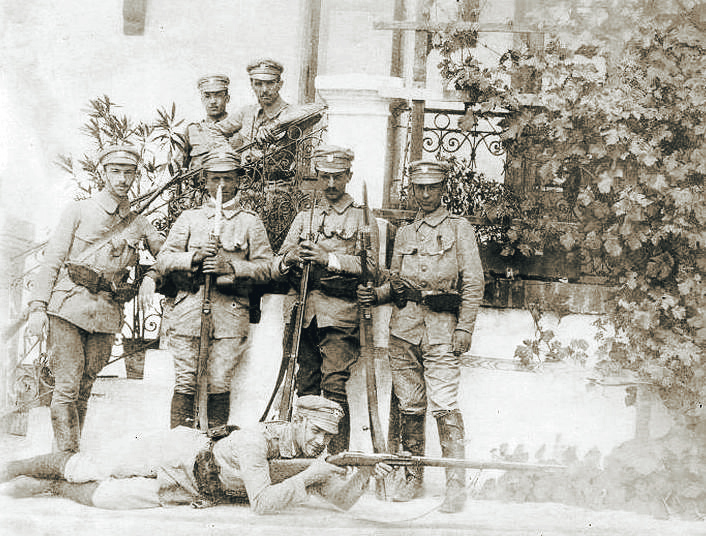
4 August 1914 Seven Lancers of Belina in Goszyce:Top row Left to right: Ludwik Skrzyński "Kmicic ", Władysław Prażmowski "Belia". Middle row From left to right: Zygmunt Karwacki "Bończa ", Stanisław Skotnicki "Thunder ", Janusz Głuchowski "Janusz ", Antoni jablonski "Zdzisław "; Bottom: Stefan Kulesza "Hanka "

Belina’s Seven were named after Władysław Belina-Prażmowski (nom de guerre Belina), who was in charge of the group. Other members included:

- Janusz Gluchowski ("Janusz"),
- Antoni Jablonski ("Zdzislaw"),
- Zygmunt Karwacki ("Boncza"),
- Stefan Kulesza ("Hanka"),
- Stanisław Grzmot-Skotnicki ("Grzmot"),
- Ludwik Kmicic-Skrzyński ("Kmicic").

On August 3, 1914 after midnight, the group, armed with rifles and pistols, and equipped both with civilian clothing and uniforms, crossed the border in two horse-drawn britzkas (carriages). Their plan was to penetrate the area, destroy a Russian Army mobilization office in Jedrzejow, capture horses, and become a cavalry unit.

In the morning, the seven men arrived at a manor house in Goszyce, which belonged to Zofia Zawiszanka, a member of Polish patriotic organizations and personal friend of Zygmunt Karwacki. After receiving food, they continued their journey towards Jedrzejow. To their surprise, Russian forces had abandoned the town, fearful of rumours of numerous Polish forces heading towards them.

The leader of the group, Wladyslaw Prazmowski, came to the conclusion that the mission was accomplished and decided to return to Galicia, via Słomniki. Belina wanted to attack a Russian border guard outpost located in Słomniki, but after arriving there it turned out that Russian forces were too numerous. Polish rebels observed the enemy from a distance, and when the Russians had left Słomniki, they set out on their return journey.

In the morning of August 4, 1914, Belina and his men reached the village of Prandocin. Suddenly they spotted a Russian mounted patrol. Belina, who underestimated enemy forces, ordered his men to attack with bayonets. The Russians, who were more numerous, but had no idea of the rebel strength, retreated towards Skalbmierz.

In the village of Skrzeszowice, the rebels received horses, and on August 4 they returned to Galicia uninjured.

== Sources ==
- Marek Lis, Ksawery Zalewski, Józef Myjak, Podpułkownik Antoni Jabłoński. Wydawnictwo PAIR Myjakpress, Sandomierz-Lipnik 2008, ISBN 978-83-86436-89-7

== See also ==
- Polish Legions in World War I
- First Cadre Company
