= Bukowa, Łódź Voivodeship =

Bukowa
- Village
- Location within Poland
- Coordinates: 51°19′20″N 19°27′42″E
- Country: Poland
- Voivodeship: Łódź
- County: Bełchatów
- Gmina: Bełchatów

Bukowa [buˈkɔva] is a village in the administrative district of Gmina Bełchatów, within Bełchatów County, Łódź Voivodeship, located in central Poland.
