= Polish Rifle Squads =

The Polish Rifle Squads (Polskie Drużyny Strzeleckie, PDS) was a Polish pro-independence paramilitary organization, founded in 1911 by the Youth Independence Organization Zarzewie in the Austro-Hungarian sector of partitioned Poland. Among its founders were Norwid Neugebauer, Marian Januszajtis-Żegota, Henryk Bagiński and Eugeniusz Homer.

The organization was similar in spirit to, and closely cooperated with, the Riflemen's Association. It too was supported by the Austro-Hungarian government, which wanted to raise a Polish army for use in World War I. By 1914 the organization numbered 6,000 members. Most of them joined Józef Piłsudski's Polish Legions in World War I.

Before its legalization, the PDS operated as an underground organization called Polish Military Alliance (Polski Zwiazek Wojskowy, PZW). Its objective was to prepare the Polish nation for fight for independence, with emphasis on training of officer corps of the future army. In October 1910, the PZW took the name Armia Polska (Polish Army), organizing paramilitary courses in Austrian Galicia, as well as in Congress Poland and Vienna. In 1911-1912, after legalization and changing name to Polish Rifle Squads, the organization had 650 members. By the outbreak of the First World War, its membership grew rapidly, to over 6,000 members, divided into 127 so-called rifle teams. The PDS closely cooperated with the Union of Active Struggle, and as a result, both organizations coordinated their activities, introducing same kind of uniforms. Members of the PDS used several kinds of weapons during military training courses. Most popular were Mannlicher–Schönauer and obsolete M1867 Werndl–Holub rifles.

== See also ==
- Riflemen's Association
