= Goszyce, Lesser Poland Voivodeship =

Goszyce
- Village
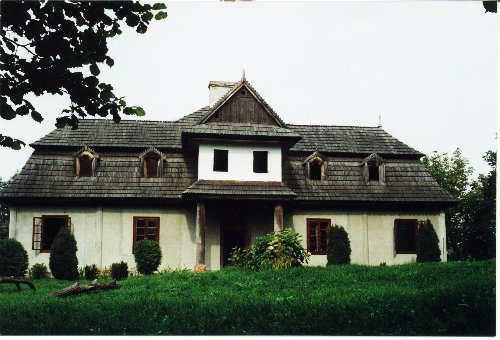
- The oldest wooden manor (dworek) in Poland

- Location within Poland
- Coordinates: 50°10′38″N 20°7′52″E
- Country: Poland
- Voivodeship: Lesser Poland
- County: Kraków
- Gmina: Kocmyrzów-Luborzyca

Goszyce [ɡɔˈʂɨt͡sɛ] is a village in the administrative district of Gmina Kocmyrzów-Luborzyca, within Kraków County, Lesser Poland Voivodeship, in southern Poland.
