= Beniaminów =

- Village
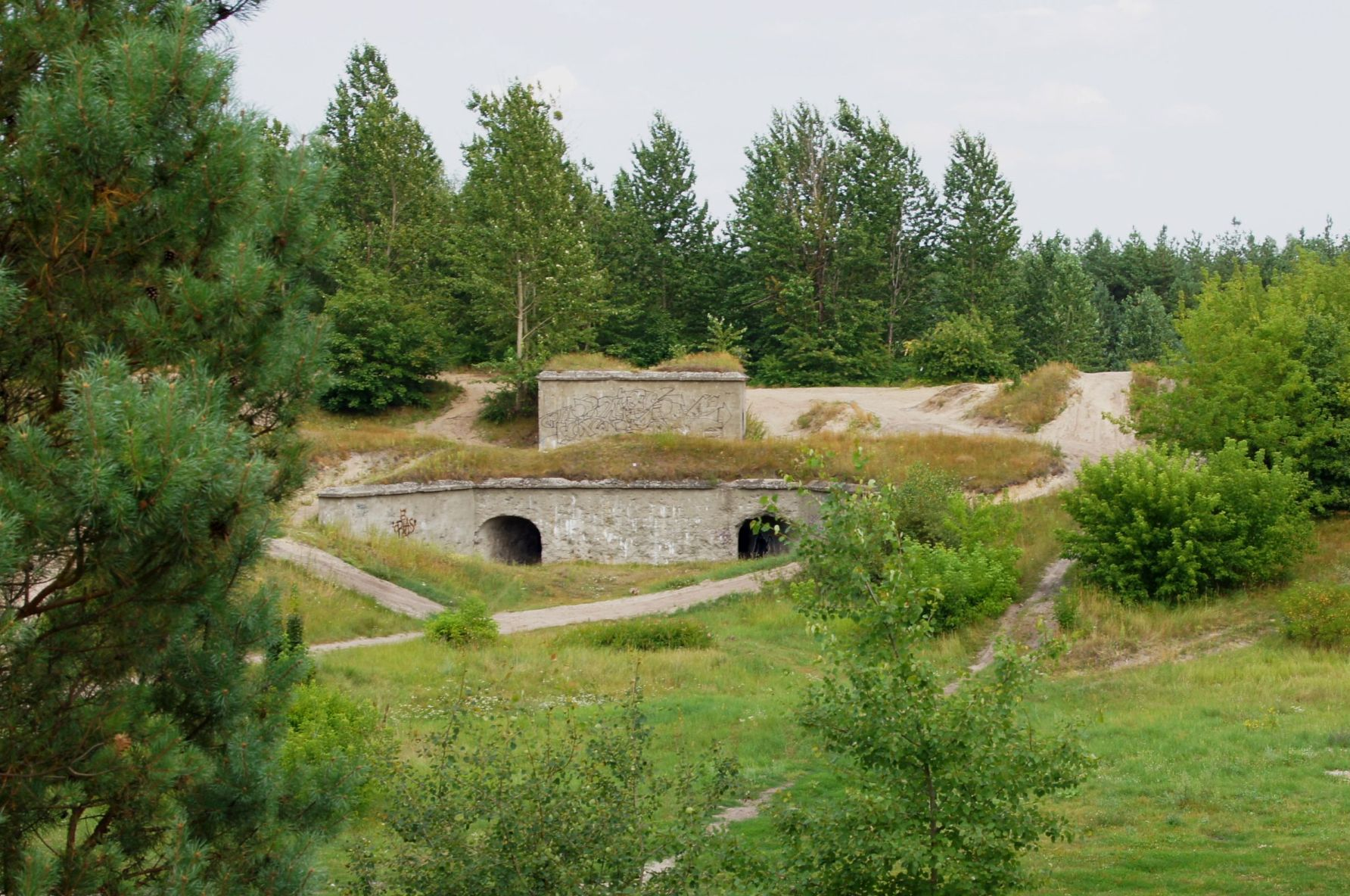
- Fort Beniaminów

- Location within Poland
- Coordinates: 52°27′N 21°06′E
- Country: Poland
- Voivodeship: Masovian
- County: Legionowo
- Gmina: Nieporęt

Population
  - Total: 188
- Time zone: UTC+1 (CET)
  - Summer (DST): UTC+2 (CEST)
- Vehicle registration: WL

Beniaminów [bɛɲaˈminuf] is a village in central Poland, administratively located in the Legionowo County in the Masovian Voivodeship. It is located east of Warsaw, between Legionowo and Nieporęt within the Warsaw metropolitan area.

== History ==
Within the village are remnants of a 19th-century fort.

During World War I, in 1917, after the Oath Crisis, members of the Polish Legions who had refused to swear an oath of loyalty to the German Emperor were interned there by the German occupiers.

Following the joint German-Soviet invasion of Poland, which started World War II in September 1939, Beniaminów was occupied by Germany. In 1942, the German Wehrmacht ran the Stalag 368 prisoner-of-war camp for Soviet POWs, notably many of non-Russian origin, e.g. Georgians, Belarusians, Uzbeks, in the village. In 1943, the Germans relocated the Stalag 333 POW camp from Komorowo to Beniaminów. It housed Italian and Soviet POWs. More than 30,000 POWs died from harsh treatment and malnutrition. In January 1944, it was converted into the Oflag 73 POW camp for Italian, Soviet, Romanian and Polish officers. Among the Poles was General Tadeusz Bór-Komorowski.
