= Polish Armed Forces (Second Polish Republic) =

Military of the Second Polish Republic (1920–1939)

- Wojsko Polskie
- Symbol of the Polish Armed Forces.
- Motto: God, Honor, Fatherland (Bóg, Honor, Ojczyzna)
- Founded: 1918
- Disbanded: 1939
- Service branches: Polish Land Forces; Polish Air Forces; Polish Navy; Polish Special Forces
- Headquarters: Warsaw

Leadership
- President Supreme Commander: Ignacy Mościcki (last)
- Minister of National Defence: Tadeusz Kasprzycki (last)
- Chief of the General Staff: GB Wacław Stachiewicz (last)

Personnel
- Military age: 18 years of age
- Active personnel: 950,000 (1939)

Related articles
- History: List of Polish wars Timeline of the Polish Army
- Ranks: Polish Armed Forces rank insignia

The Polish Armed Forces (Polish: Wojsko Polskie) were the military of the Second Polish Republic from 1919 until the demise of independent Poland at the onset of World War II in September 1939.

== History ==
The outbreak of First World War meant that a large number of Poles from the lands of the Polish partitions were forced to stand as soldiers in the ranks of German, Russian and Austro-Hungarian armies. In addition to these troops, Polish volunteer units were formed to fight either on the side of the coalition or central states.

A branch of 'Bajonians' was established in France and in Poland by Witold Ostoja-Gorczyński (Legion of Puławy). However, these were small units. The first ceased to exist due to losses, and the second could not grow due to political considerations.

The Polish Legions were the greater union of the Polish Army of the independent Polish–Lithuanian Commonwealth. They were created in 1914 by brigadier Józef Piłsudski. The members of these formations were members of underground military associations. From 1908, there was an Active Fighting Association. In 1910, two public organizations, Shooting Association and Towarzystwo "Strzelec", related to ZWC, were established. In 1911, on the initiative of the Zarzewie Independence Youth Organization, the Shooting Teams were created. The next organization was Bartosz Brigades formed in 1908 on the initiative of Wawrzyniec Dayczak.

Apart from the Polish Legions, a significant force was the Polish Army in the East, including the Polish Corps organized in Russia since 1917. They constituted a significant part of the staff of the Polish Army revived in November 1918.

=== First years of peace ===
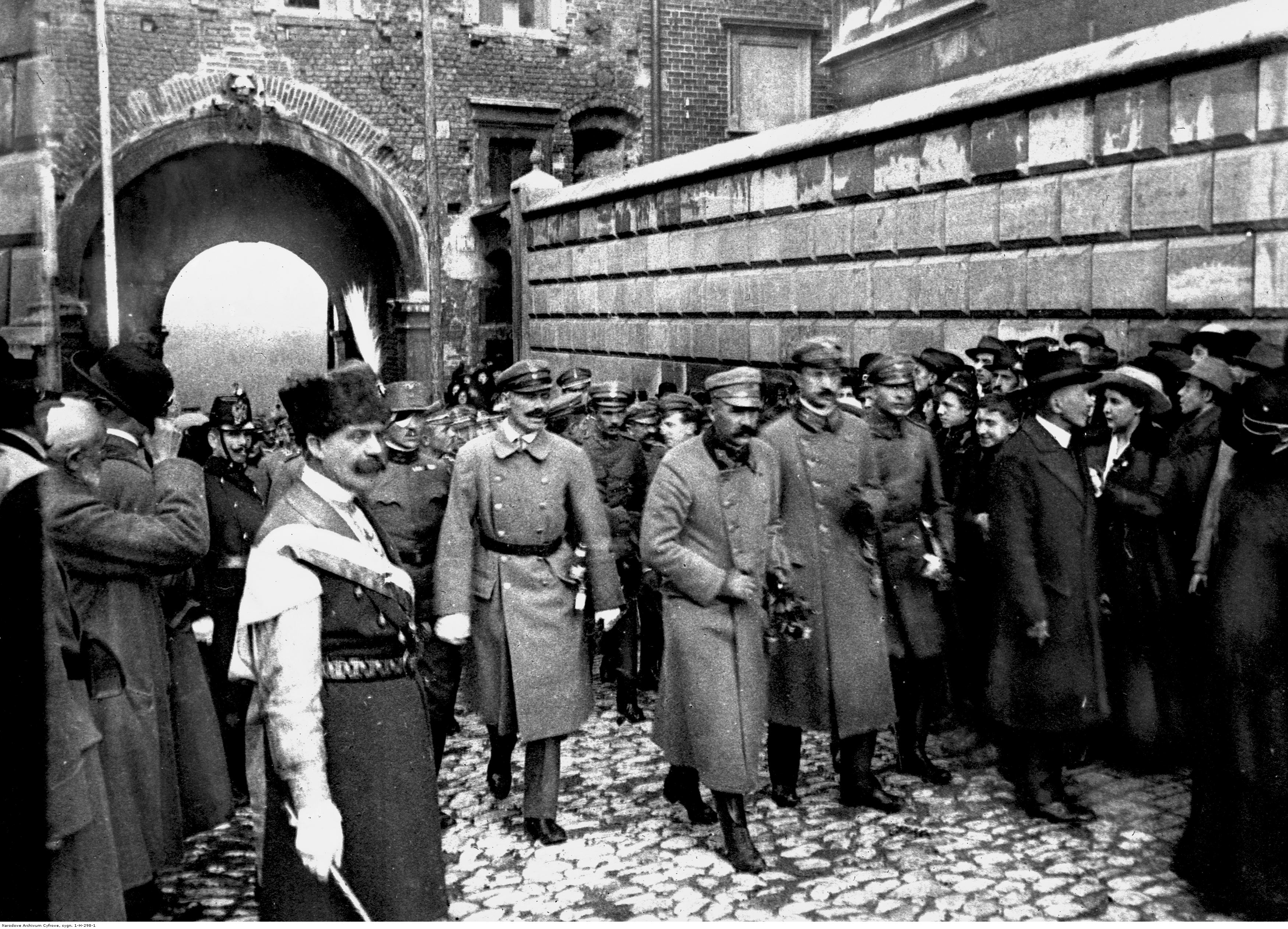
Unification of the Polish Army Day, Pilsudski in the Wawel Castle

In 1921–1939, the Polish armed forces consisted of the army and navy. The army consisted of main weapons: infantry, cavalry (from 1924) and artillery, technical weapons: sappers, communication and car troops and armored weapons, auxiliary weapons: gendarmerie and rolling stock. In addition, the army included aviation and organizational units of the PEC (from 1924) and the National Defense (from 1937).

The army numbered July 31, 1921: 20,038 officers and military officials, 1,583 ensigns, 248,835 soldiers and 67,390 horses.

The percentage of soldiers of Polish nationality in 1922 was about 78%, after conscription in Eastern Galicia a year later it dropped below 66%, although according to the assumptions of the authorities, Poles were to constitute a minimum of 2/3 soldiers. Despite the efforts of the administration, the percentage of Poles fell to 64% in 1926.

A personnel policy was pursued in the army, which was strongly criticized by representatives of the Jewish minority. Soldiers of Jewish origin were treated as second-class soldiers or even suspected of disloyalty to the Polish state. Jews were removed from all formations, especially from the navy, aviation and communications. Even during the Polish-Bolshevik war, a camp in Jabłonna (pl) was created, in which about 1,000 soldiers and officers of Jewish descent were interned (the decision to establish it was issued on August 16, 1920, the camp operated until September 9, 1920; its creation caused an international scandal, from which Minister Sosnkowski had to explain before the Sejm and the public). In reply to parliamentary interpellations, Sosnkowski stated that "Jews are not fit for more serious work than typing" In connection with the Sejm resolution of June 17, 1919, according to which only Polish citizens of Polish nationality could be officers of Jewish descent, even promoted officers of independent Poland.

On March 23, 1923, the General Staff of the Polish Army issued a secret order regarding all Jews in special services. From the end of the 1920s, people of Jewish origin were not recruited into the aviation, navy, communications and armor, and the Border Protection Corps.

=== 1926-1936 ===
Following the failed assassination attempt at him in May 1926, Marshal Piłsudski began taking efforts to better control the armed forces. As a result, Pilsudskiego and gathered around him an environment of generals and officers, mainly from former Polish Legions, took over total control over the armed forces. By contrast, Pilsudskiego's civilians supporters created a political camp called sanation.

Almost immediately after Marshal Piłsudski took over power over the army, who took over the portfolio of the minister of military affairs, was reorganized the highest military authorities. On June 11, 1926 he was appointed chairman of the Central Military Council. On August 6, a decree of the President of the Republic of Poland was published, countersigned by the minister of military affairs, on conduct command over armed forces in peacetime and the establishment of a General Inspector Office of the Armed Forces as the Supreme Commander foreseen on time war. Both of these positions were held by Józef Piłsudski. Hence, his duties included development and control any mobilization and operational work related to the preparation for war.

In the period 1926–1935, the officers of the Polish Armed Forces finally formed and stabilized, for the most part uniformly educated in Polish officer and cadet schools.

Signal corps were reorganized in 1929. Communication regiments and large infantry units were disassembled and received their own telegraph companies formed at the expense of battalions. Formation of signal platoons began for the cavalry brigades. In addition to the smaller formations, Radiotelegraph Regiment (Polish: Pułk Radiotelegraficzny) and Signal Training Center were created.

=== 1936-1939 ===
After the death of Józef Piłsudski, major changes in the personnel of the Polish Army took place. The position of General Inspector of the Armed Forces was taken by General Edward Rydz-Śmigły. General Tadeusz Kasprzycki became the minister of military affairs. There were also shifts in General Inspectorate Staff. Its members included Tadeusz Kutaże and Władysław Bortnowski. General Wacław Stachiewicz was appointed the Chief of the General Staff.

The new management sought to organize basic areas of military life, and above all to modernize its current structure and to equip the army with modern equipment. Intentions in the field of modernizing the army were quite serious. A special initiative in this direction was manifested by the General Staff, which obtained greater powers than before.

The growing German threat in the second half of the 1930s caused the need to coordinate the state's defense efforts. Therefore, by decree of the President of the Republic of Poland of May 9, 1936, "On Exercise sovereignty over the armed forces and organizations of supreme military authorities in peace", issued on the basis of the provisions of the new constitution from April 1935, a State Defense Committee was created, whose tasks were they were supposed to be similar to the previous Council of State Defense. It was to be a body mediating between military authorities and the government in matters related to with the preparations of the state for defense and exceeding the powers military authorities. It was headed by the president, and the general became his deputy Armed Forces Inspector. The permanent working body of the Defense Committee, namely the Secretariat, was headed by the chief of the General Staff.

==== Modernization and expansion plan ====
In the summer of 1936, work began on a plan to modernize the Polish Army. A six-year plan of modernization and expansion of the army was created. The plan's assumptions were aimed at strengthening the firepower of the basic types of weapons: infantry and cavalry. It predicted increasing the number of manual and heavy machine guns, grenade launchers, anti-tank rifles and field guns in individual infantry divisions to the level of leading European armies.

The rapidly changing political situation in Europe in the second half of the 1930s and the growing threat of war against the Republic of Poland by Germany and the USSR resulted in the need to accelerate and complete work on the operational Plan "East" and work on the Plan "West". Their shape, among other factors, is also a meaningful expression development of Polish military thought from 1935–1939, and also a reflection of the then Polish war doctrine. This first plan, updated at the beginning of 1939 257, was directed against possible aggression by the USSR. It prepared for a defensive war in the coalition with Romania as an ally. From the western powers, however, was expected only material assistance imported by sea through the port of Gdynia. To be mobilized as part of this plan, the Polish Army was to consist of 49 large units: 37 infantry divisions, 11 cavalry brigades and a motorized brigade.The Polish Army was involved in the development of the industrial capacity of the Polish state, including the Central Industrial Region (Poland)

On September 1, 1938, the Act of April 9, 1938 on universal military duty entered into force, which sanctioned the division of the Armed Forces into: "the army" (land forces) and the navy. The army consisted of organizational units of the permanent army and organizational units of the National Defense, as well as organizational units of the Border Protection Corps.

== Structure and organization ==
The formation of the Polish Army unit took place in a complicated political situation. It encountered serious organizational and personnel difficulties. It was often improvised and spontaneous. Sometimes it was forced by changing external and internal conditions of the reviving state.

It was decided to recruit soldiers of former Polish military formations and members of secret organizations. Recruitment options were very convenient. POW ranks had over 30,000 members. There were over 15,000 former legionnaires and over 20,000 soldiers demobilized in Russia.

However, the main mobilization reserves were residents of the former Polish Kingdom and Poles serving in the ranks of foreign armies. The formation of the reborn Polish army, however, encountered difficulties related to desertions and evasion of conscripts from service in the army. Already in 1919 ordinances were issued to conduct hunts for deserters. Only in May 1920 in the Kielce region more than 2,000 deserters and conscripts were caught evading the service in the Polish army.

In connection with the resolution of the Sejm of June 17, 1919, only Polish citizens of Polish nationality could be officers (this excluded the appointment of officers, e.g. citizens of Jewish origin)

After the introduction of a peace organization in 1921 and in the early years 20s, the Polish Army formed 90 infantry regiments, 30 field artillery regiments, 10 heavy artillery regiments, a heaviest artillery regiment, a mountain artillery regiment and 10 horse artillery squadrons. From 1923 there were an artillery regiment, an anti-aircraft division, 30 independent cavalry regiments and 10 divisional regiments, which in 1924 was renamed to independent cavalry. The large number of cavalry in the Polish army and its organization into large ones units resulted not only from the specific Polish experience gained from the period of 'wars for independence and borders'. It was also conditioned economic and structural backwardness of the then agricultural Kresy.

Cavalry was a major component of the armed forces, due to the Polish conditions of road and were used as high-speed weapons. The conditions were also important prevailing in Poland and on the possible Eastern Front 181 and presence near the border with the Commonwealth of a very strong Red Army cavalry, constituting a factor of the directed maneuver, among others against Poland. Was supposed to be for it is one of the means enabling the implementation of the Soviet version of Blitzkrieg. Therefore, most Polish cavalry brigades before 1939 were stationed in the eastern districts of the corps.

=== Supreme command ===
On October 28, 1918, General Tadeusz Rozwadowski became the head of the General Staff of the Polish Army three days earlier. Upon taking up this position, he began to organize central military institutions and new branches of the Polish Army. On November 11, 1918, Józef Piłsudski assumed supreme power over the army as the commander-in-chief. There followed a further organization of the supreme military authorities: the Ministry of Military Affairs and the General Staff of the Polish Army.

From the first order to the Polish Army issued on November 12, 1918 by Józef Piłsudski:

"Soldiers!

I take command over you at a time when the heart in every Pole beats stronger and more vividly, when the children of our land saw the sun of freedom in all its splendor. Together with you I experience the emotion of this historical hour, together with you I vow to devote my life and blood to the good of the Fatherland and the happiness of its citizens. Soldiers! During the World War, attempts at Polish military formations were made in various places and conditions. With disability - it seemed - the incurable attempts of our Nation even when they were lofty and heroic were necessarily dwarfs and unilateral. The remainder of these relations is heterogeneity harmful to the army. I hope that each of you can overcome yourself and get the effort to remove differences and friction, clicks and backwaters in the army, to quickly create a sense of camaraderie and facilitate work. ...

I would like ... that I could be aware of my activities before the nation and diligently say about myself and about you that we were not only the first but also good soldiers of the risen Poland. Read this order in front of my subordinated troops."

==== Ministry of Military Affairs ====
The Ministry of Military Affairs (Polish: Ministerstwo Spraw Wojskowych) included specific organizational units dealing with various fields of military affairs. These were the departments of: Mobilization and Supplements, Technical and Communication, Economic, Artillery, Military Education, Legal and Military and General Section.

From 1919, it included further departments: Personnel, Maritime Affairs (developed from the former Navy section), for Horses and Rolling Stock and Information. In addition, the Military, Technical, Military and Geographic institutes and the Central Army Supply Office have been established at the ministry.

In the second half of 1919 there was another reorganization of the ministry. As a result, general inspectorates of: Infantry, Driving and Artillery, and inspectorates of: Military Buildings, Communications Forces, Railway Forces, War Schools, Engineering and Minesweepers, Air Force (Polish: Lotnictwo wojskowe Rzeczypospolitej Polskiej), Rolling Forces, Car Forces, Gendarmerie, Border Guard and Prison Camps.

=== Artillery Groups ===
Artillery Groups were branches and sub-units of the organic artillery of large infantry and cavalry units, as well as the artillery of the Supreme Commander's Chief stationing in one corps district and subordinated to the command of the artillery group.

The commander of the artillery group was subordinated to the First Deputy Minister of Military Affairs through the head of the Artillery Department of the Ministry of Military Affairs. In relation to soldiers serving in artillery units, LFA had disciplinary powers of the division commander, while in relation to soldiers serving in regiments and divisions of large units of organic artillery had disciplinary powers of the division infantry commander, only during the fire school.

On October 28, 1935, changes were made in the subordination of artillery groups. From now on, the group commanders were subject to the First Deputy Minister of Military Affairs through the head of the Artillery Department of the Ministry of Military Affairs only in matters of organization and training, while on other matters - on a professional and disciplinary basis - to commanders of the corps districts. May 21, 1937 11 Artillery Group was subordinated to the commander of the Anti-aircraft Defense MSWojsk, and on May 20, 1938 renamed the Group of Anti-aircraft Artillery. In August 1939, the current Anti-Aircraft Artillery Group (GAPlot) was divided into: 1 GAPlot and 2 GAPlot - both based in Warsaw.

GA commanders were directly subordinated to the units of the LFA artillery, while in relation to the organic artillery units of large units exercised control of the state of training. The duties of the commander of the artillery group included cooperation with army inspectors, work generals and inspection generals as well as commanders of corps districts in the field of inspection and garrison matters of the units subordinated to them.

== Branches ==
The basic type of armed service was infantry organized in 30 divisions, including two mountain divisions. Each division at the foot of peace had three infantry regiments and a field artillery regiment. At war, it was to be reinforced with other weapons and necessary services. Each of the 84 infantry regiments and 6 regiments of the Podhale rifles consisted of three battalions. Compulsory military service in the infantry lasted 18 months.

The second armed service was cavalry. After the end of hostilities, Poland had 40 cavalry regiments, including 27 cavalry regiments, 3 cavalry regiments and 10 cavalry regiments and 10 horse artillery squadrons. Cavalry and cavalry regiments and horse artillery squadrons were organized into ten independent cavalry brigades. Regiments of horse shooters were subordinated to the commanders of the corps districts. Each of them consisted of three cavalry squadrons and a machine gun squadron. During the war, each of the active infantry divisions was to receive one squadron of mounted shooters with a machine gun platoon. In 1924, the cavalry was renamed and reorganized. Four divisions and five independent cavalry brigades and three new horse artillery squadrons were created. Each division consisted of three two-cavalry brigades, two horse artillery squadrons and three squadrons (armored cars, communications and pioneers). Independent cavalry brigades consisted of three cavalry regiments, a horse artillery squadron and a pioneer squadron, with the exception of 5 SBK, which had four cavalry regiments and an additional squadron of armored cars.

Due to its intended use, artillery was divided into organic artillery of large infantry and cavalry units (the above-mentioned field artillery regiments and horse artillery squadrons) and independent artillery consisting of ten heavy artillery regiments, one heaviest artillery regiment, two mountain artillery regiments, as well as one squadron zenith artillery, as anti-aircraft artillery was then called.

Aviation was part of the land forces. The basic organizational and administrative formation was the regiment. In the mid-1920s, the Polish Army had 6 air regiments and a naval squadron. The regiments were stationed in Warsaw, Kraków, Poznań, Toruń, Lida and Lviv, and the squadron in Puck. Sapper troops were intended for communication and fortification works, for destroying fortifications and for miners' activities.

Communications troops were divided into record and non-record formations. The recording units were: communication regiments, a radiotelegraph regiment and independent communication battalions. The non-record ones included: Central Communications Depots, Central Communications Workshops, Central Radiotelegraphy Station, Communications School Camp as well as telegraph and telephone stations serving authorities and military institutions.

== See also ==
- Polish Armed Forces in the East (1914–1920)
- Polish Armed Forces in the East
  - Anders' Army
  - First Polish Army (1944–1945)
- Polish Armed Forces in the West
- Polish People's Army
- Polish Legions in World War I
- Polish Military Organisation
- Polish Military Organization of Upper Silesia
- Internal Military Service (WSW)
- Border Protection Troops (WOP)
- Armia Ludowa
- Gwardia Ludowa
- National Armed Forces
- Home Army
- Union of Armed Struggle
- National Military Organization
- ORMO
- Territorial Defense Forces
- 37th Łęczyca Infantry Regiment
