= Union of Active Struggle =

Polish secret military organization

The Union of Active Struggle (Polish: Związek Walki Czynnej; ZWC), also translated as Union for Active Struggle and Union for Active Resistance, was a Polish secret military organization founded in June 1908 in Lwów by Józef Piłsudski, Marian Kukiel, Kazimierz Sosnkowski and Władysław Sikorski, all members of the Combat Organization of the Polish Socialist Party in the Kingdom of Poland.

== History ==
After the extremely successful Bezdany raid in 1908, Piłsudski decided to transform the Combat Organization into a newer, larger formation. The ZWC's main purpose was to prepare Polish officer cadres for a future Polish army for likely hostilities with Russia, one of the three partitioners of Poland, seen by Piłsudski's faction as Poland's worst enemy. The goal of Piłsudski and his followers was independence and liberation of Polish territories, and for that reason he became a temporary ally of the weakest of the partitioning powers, Austro-Hungary. Piłsudski was convinced that the Central Powers would first defeat Russia but that they, in turn, would be defeated by England and France. His documented prediction, in the event, proved correct.

ZWC was led by Piłsudski, and below him was the Main Council (Rada Główna) and Association Department (Wydział Związku) composed of four members: Kazimierz Sosnkowski, Władysław Jaxa-Rożen, Stefan Dąbkowski and Zygmunt Bohuszewicz. Many of ZWC members were students. ZWC had members in all three partitions, as well as in some larger academic Polonia centers outside Poland.

From its inception, ZWC received crucial support in the highest circles of the Austrian Empire, which was preparing for war with Imperial Russia. As the Great War (World War I) loomed on the horizon, Austrian officials supported Polish organizations that favored an "Austro-Polish solution" and opposed the National Democrats and Roman Dmowski) who, before reaching for Polish independence, wanted the Poles and all their territories to be placed under a single state, which at the time could be achieved only by the Russian Empire. Austrians also hoped that the organization would allow Poles to assist them militarily in the Austrian war with Russia. Pilsudski's plan was to first use the Austrian help to create the elite cadre for the future Polish military which would later fight Russia but not for the interests of the Austrian Habsburgs but for their own Polish state. Cooperation between Austro-Hungary, the most conservative regimes in Europe, which proved to be the most liberal of partitioned powers, and provided a great deal of autonomy and religious freedom to its Polish subjects, and Pilsudski, a Polish Socialist revolutionary, who was involved in the past in bank and postal robberies, sabotage and subversive destruction as means to achieve the political goals.

As the Austro-Hungary government preferred to have more control over the secret paramilitary organizations, two legal organizations, subordinated to ZWC were created in 1910 with the approval of officials in Austro-Hungary, who would be able to supervise those legal organizations to a much larger extent then the secret ZWC. Those two organizations were Związek Strzelecki and Polskie Drużyny Strzeleckie, both of them acted to prepare Poles to serve in the military. ZWC nonetheless remained active until 1914, when with the onset of the First World War it became no longer necessary.

In 1912 the First Balkan War shook the politics of Europe and Piłsudski who expected that a greater war is coming reformed ZWC (also at that time, he became one of the creators of Provisional Commission of Confederated Independence Parties (Komisja Tymczasowa Skonfederowanych Stronnictw Niepodległościowych)). It then become more autocratic, with Piłsudski (the Commandant) and his deputy, Sosnkowski (Chief of High Command) assuming most responsibilities and power. In 1914, ZWC had 7239 members, which would form the basis of the Polish Legions in World War I.
