= Riflemen's Association =

Polish paramilitary formations

Polish Riflemen's Association
- Związki Strzeleckie
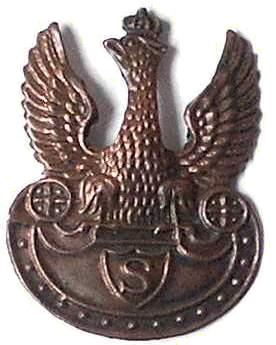
- Badge of the Riflemen's Association "Strzelec"
- Type: Volunteer paramilitary formations
- Location(s): Austrian Partition and Western Europe
- Members: 7,500 members (1912)
- Website: www.kgstrzelec.pl www.zsstrzelec.com.pl www.zwiazek-strzelecki.pl

The Riflemen's Association (Polish pronunciation: [Związek Strzelecki]) was an organization formed in great numbers prior to World War I. One of the better known associations, Strzelec (Rifleman), was a Polish paramilitary cultural and educational organization created in 1910 in Lwów as a legal front of the Związek Walki Czynnej (ZWC, Union of Active Struggle). It was somewhat reinstated in Poland in 1991, after the fall of communism.

An important part of the Association's mission was training young Poles in military skills. Before World War I, the Riflemen's Association provided military training to over 8,000 people, and its trainees subsequently formed an important part of the Polish Legions in World War I. Prominent members and leaders of the Riflemen’s Association included Józef Piłsudski, Henryk Dobrzański, Kazimierz Sosnkowski, Edward Rydz-Śmigły, Władysław Sikorski, Marian Kukiel, Walery Sławek, Julian Stachiewicz, Aleksander Prystor, and Włodzimierz Tetmajer.

== 1910–1918 ==
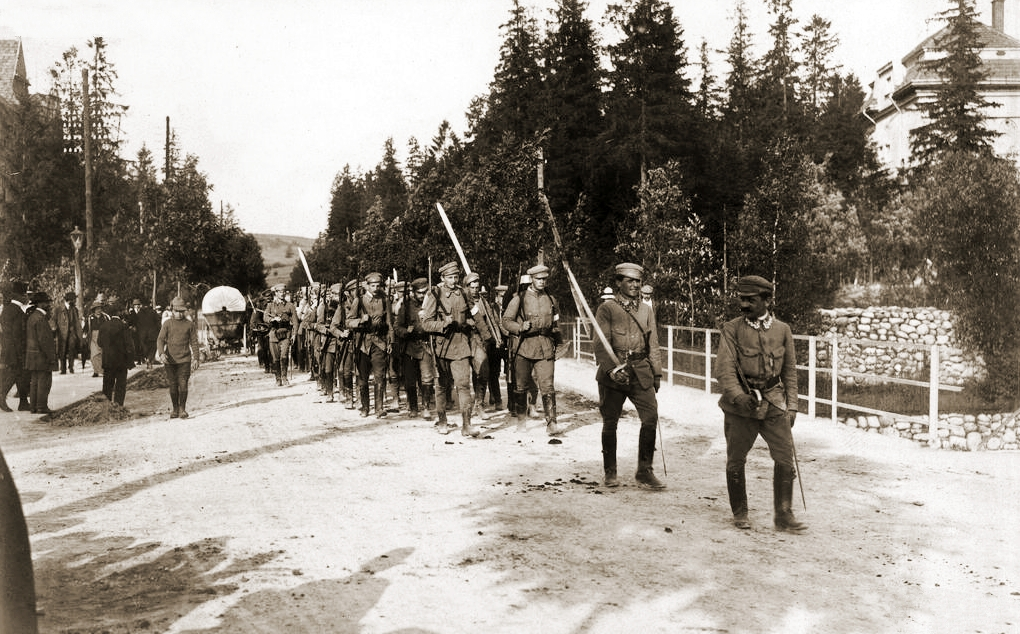
Maneuvers of the Riflemen's Association, Zakopane, August 1913. At the head of the branch Mieczysław Rys-Trojanowski.

In 1910, upon initiative of the ZWC, two legal paramilitary organizations were created in Austrian Galicia. These were the Riflemen's Association (in Lwow), and the Rifleman Society (Towarzystwo Strzelec) in Kraków. In 1912, both organizations were merged, under the Headquarters of the Riflemen’s Association, located in Lwow, and commanded by Józef Piłsudski and Kazimierz Sosnkowski. The association was divided into the following branches:

- Western Galicia (Kraków),
- Central Galicia (Rzeszów),
- Eastern Galicia (Lwow),
- Command of Congress Poland,
- Foreign Command.

Polish Riflemen's Associations active in the German Empire (see Partitions of Poland) were illegal, and operated without permission of the government of the Kingdom of Prussia. Meanwhile, the government in Vienna supported the associations, knowing that they were training for the future World War I with the Russian Empire. As a result, several paramilitary courses were organized in Austrian Galicia. Among the most active members of the Riflemen's Association were students of Kraków's Jagiellonian University, and by the summer of 1914, the association had 6,449 trained members, most of whom came from western Galicia. At the same time, Polish Rifle Squads had some 4,000 trained members.

== 1918–1940 ==
In the Second Polish Republic, the Riflemen's Association concentrated its efforts in the countryside, and among poor urban youth. It organized gymnastics classes, reading courses and paramilitary courses, and was under supervision of the Ministry of Military Affairs (Ministerstwo Spraw Wojskowych). The association had 3,000 local branches, with 15 regions. It had its own libraries, reading rooms, choirs, orchestras, people’s houses, and sports fields. In mid-1939, the association had some 500,000 members.

The conspirational Organization of the White Eagle (Organizacja Orła Białego) was created in late September 1939 in German-occupied Kraków. Based on the Riflemen's Association, it merged with the Union of Armed Struggle in June 1940. The Organization of the White Eagle published its own magazine, Nakazy Dnia (The Orders of the Day).

== Contemporary ==
Several modern organizations exist which trace back their roots to the traditions of the Riflemen's Association. To unite them, a Federation of Riflemen's Teams and Associations was formed under the command of Maciej Wechmann. On 15 July 2009 the two main associations, Związek Strzelecki and Związek Strzelecki “Strzelec”, signed a declaration of cooperation. The headquarters of the new body is in Warsaw.

== See also ==
- Polish Rifle Squads
- The Seven Lancers of Belina
