= Polish Legions in World War I =

Austro-Hungarian military unit

Polish Legions
- Legiony Polskie
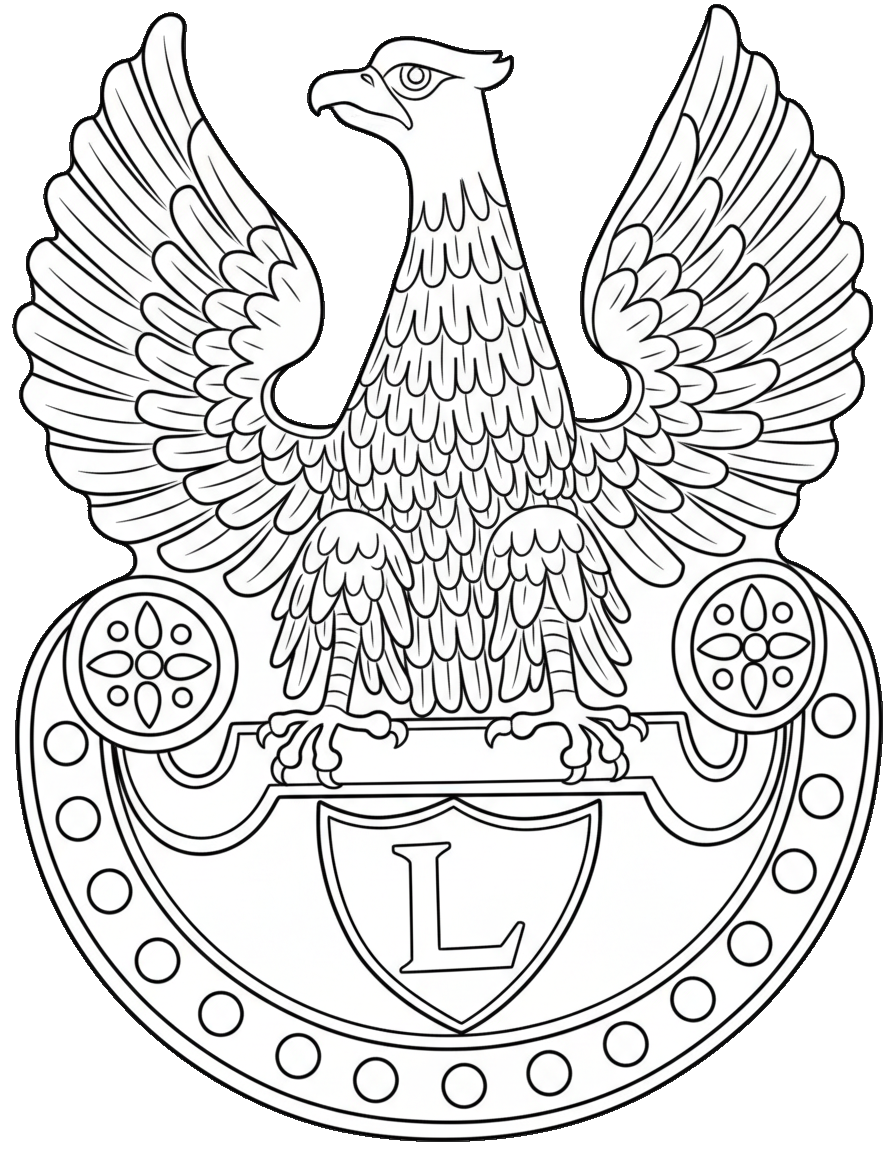
- Active: 1914
- Disbanded: 1917
- Country: Austria-Hungary (Polish National Organization)
- March: We Are the First Brigade

Commanders
- Komendant: Józef Piłsudski

The Polish Legions (Polish: Legiony Polskie) was a name of the Polish military force (the first active Polish army in generations) established in August 1914 in Galicia soon after World War I erupted between the opposing alliances of the Triple Entente on one side (comprising the British Empire, the French Republic and the Russian Empire) and the Central Powers on the other side, comprising the German Empire and Austria-Hungary. The Legions became "a founding myth for the creation of modern Poland" in spite of their relatively short existence; they were replaced by the Polish Auxiliary Corps (Polish: Polski Korpus Posiłkowy) formation on 20 September 1916, merged with Polish II Corps in Russia on 19 February 1918 for the Battle of Rarańcza against Austria-Hungary, and disbanded following the military defeat at the Battle of Kaniów in May 1918, against Imperial Germany. General Haller escaped to France to form the Polish army in the West against the Treaty of Brest-Litovsk, which granted Germany sovereignty over Polish territories.

The Legions took part in many battles against the forces of the Imperial Russia, both in Galicia and in the Carpathian Mountains. They suffered heavy casualties outnumbered three to one in the Battle of Łowczówek. They captured Kielce, and in 1915 took part in the offensive on Warsaw. In June 1916 the unit had approximately 25,000 soldiers. Both the number of troops and the composition of units changed rapidly. After the Battle of Kostiuchnówka where 2,000 Polish soldiers died delaying a Russian offensive, Józef Piłsudski demanded that the Central Powers issue a guarantee of independence for Poland and partially succeeded. The Polish Legions became the Polish Auxiliary Corps. After the Act of 5th November of 1916 which pronounced the creation of the puppet Kingdom of Poland of 1916–18, the Polish Legions were transferred under German command. However, most of the members refused to swear allegiance to the German Kaiser and were interned in Beniaminów and Szczypiorno (the Oath crisis). Approximately 3,000 of them were drafted into the Austro-Hungarian army and sent to the Italian Front while approximately 7,500 stayed in the Polish Auxiliary Corps, part of the failed German Polnische Wehrmacht.

We Are the First Brigade performed by Eugeniusz Mossakowski, 1931

== History ==
According to Prit Buttar, "When war broke out, Piłsudski was quick to recognize that an important preliminary step in Poland's path to independence was the defeat of tsarist Russia... Piłsudski was no supporter of the Central Powers, and once Russia had been driven out of Polish territory, he believed that he and his fellow Poles would have to persuade the Germans and Austro-Hungarians to leave too, but he held secret meetings with representatives of France and Great Britain to make clear to the western members of the Entente that Polish troops would never fight against them, only against Russia."

The formation of the Legions was declared by Józef Piłsudski in his order of 22 August 1914. The Austrian government, having jurisdiction over the area, officially agreed to the formation on 27 August 1914.

The unit became an independent formation of the Austro-Hungarian Army thanks to the efforts of the KSSN and the Polish members of the Austrian parliament. Personnel came mostly from former members of various scouting organizations, including Drużyny Strzeleckie and Związek Strzelecki, as well from as volunteers from all around the Austro-Hungarian Empire.

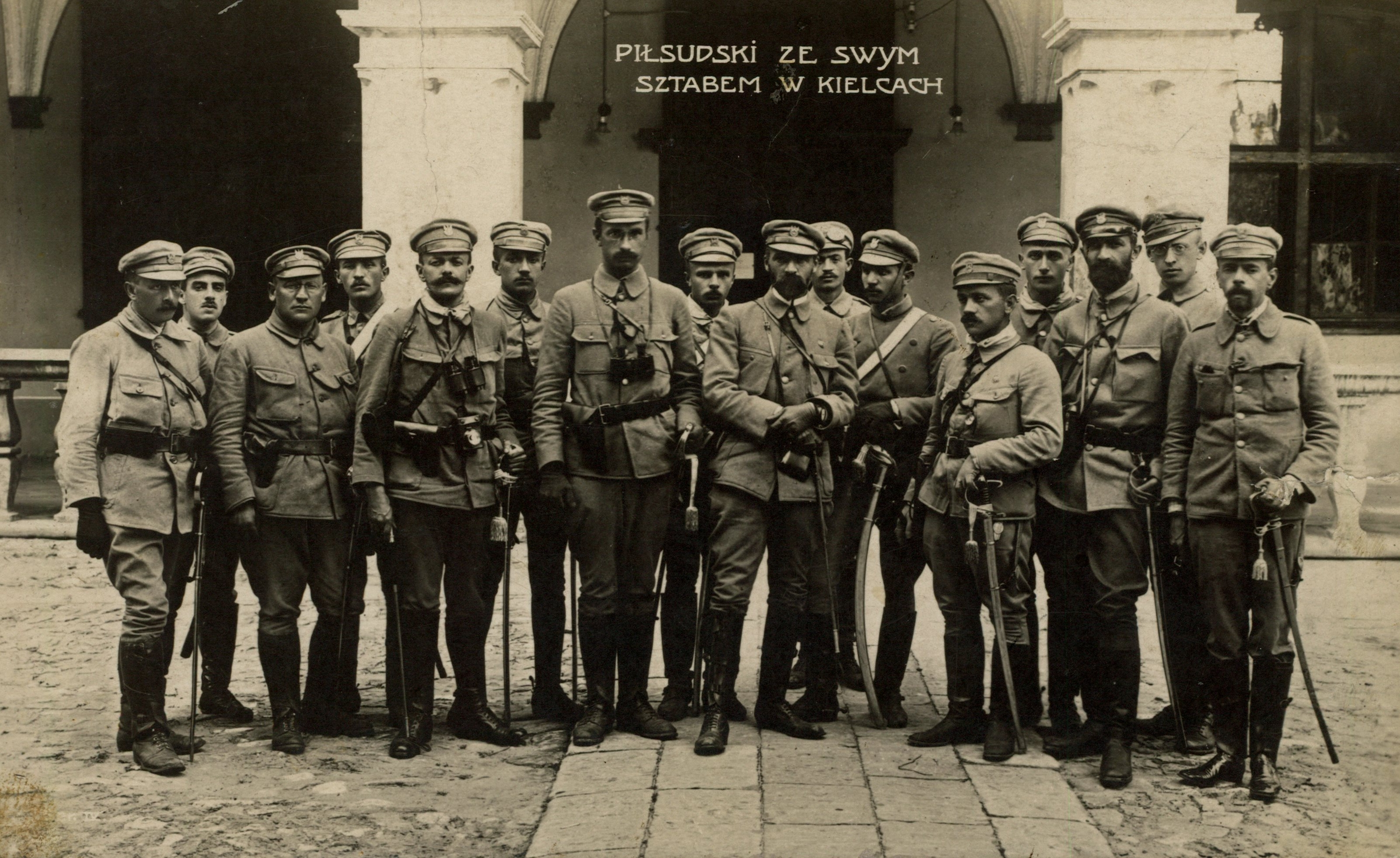
Col. Józef Piłsudski with his staff in front of the Governor's Palace in Kielce, 1914

Initially, the Polish Legions were composed of two legions: the Eastern and the Western Legion, both formed on 27 August. After a Russian victory in the Battle of Galicia (August–September 1914) the Eastern Polish legion refused to fight on behalf of the Austro-Hungarian side against Russia and was disbanded on 21 September. On 19 December, the Western legion was transformed into three brigades: the I Brigade of the Polish Legions under Józef Piłsudski, formed in mid-December; the II Brigade of the Polish Legions under Józef Haller

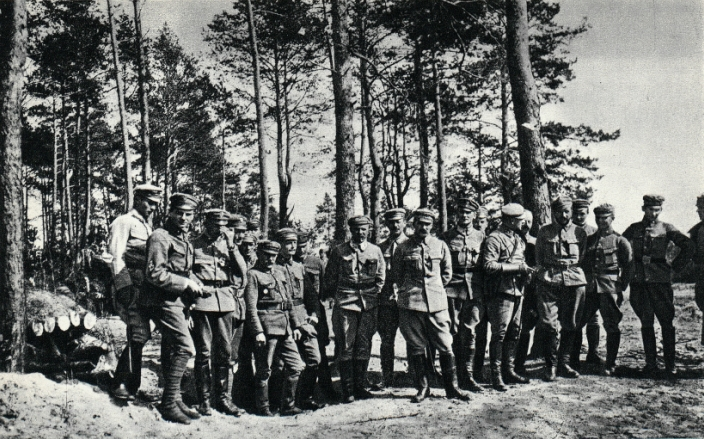
Col. Józef Piłsudski and his officers, 1915

de Hallenburg, formed between mid-December and March (sources vary); and the III Brigade of the Polish Legions under Zygmunt Zieliński (later Bolesław Roja), formed on 8 May 1915. All brigades had the following:

- Artillery Battalions with served with I, II, and III Brigade
- Cavalry Regiments: 1st served in I Brigade; 2nd served in II Brigade; 3rd served in III Brigade
- Infantry Regiments: 1st, 5th, 7th served in I Brigade; 2nd, 3rd served in II Brigade; 4th served in both II and III Brigades; 5th, 6th served in III Brigade.

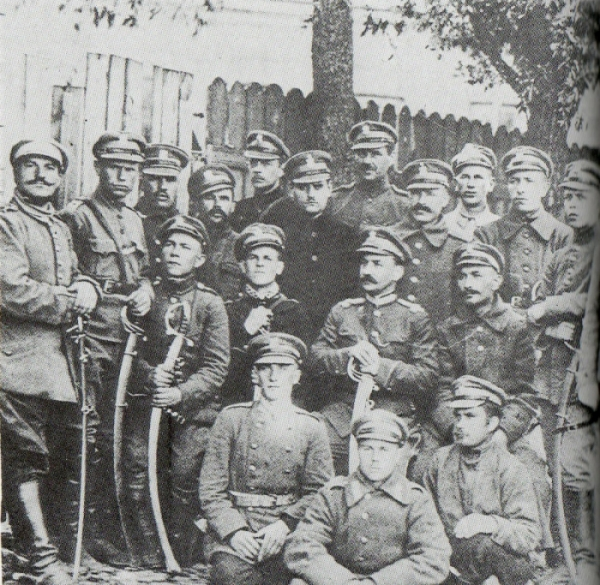
Tatar uhlans from Grodno area – soldiers of Polish Army in 1919

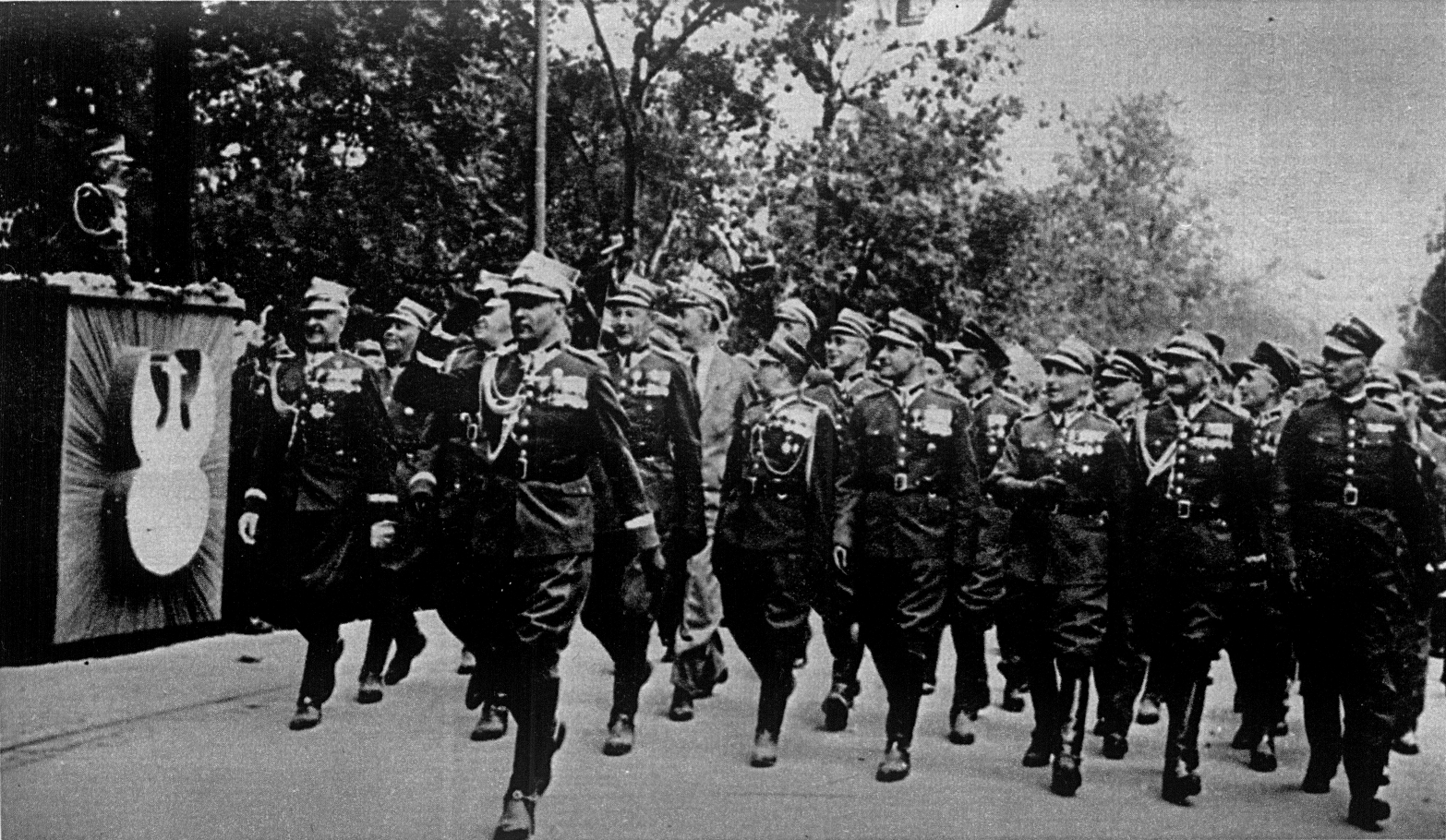
The last march of the First Cadre Company, August 6th 1939

The commanders of the Legions were consecutively: Gen. Karol Trzaska-Durski (September 1914 – February 1916), Gen. Stanisław Puchalski (until November 1916), Col. Stanisław Szeptycki (until April 1917), and Col. Zygmunt Zieliński (until August 1917). After the war ended the officers of the Polish Legions became the backbone of the Polish Army.

The last march of the First Cadre Company, August 6th 1939

In independent Poland the Legions were celebrated as those who regained Poland's independence. Being a Legionnaire meant being part of a new elite by merit. Each year on August 6th the march of the First Cadre Company was commemorated in Kraków Oleandry Street. In the 1930s a building was built as a museum of the Legions. It stands until today. The last march of the original company took place on 6th of August 1939. After the toppling of communism these marches were revived.

== Battles ==
Operations of Polish Legions and the Puławy Legion
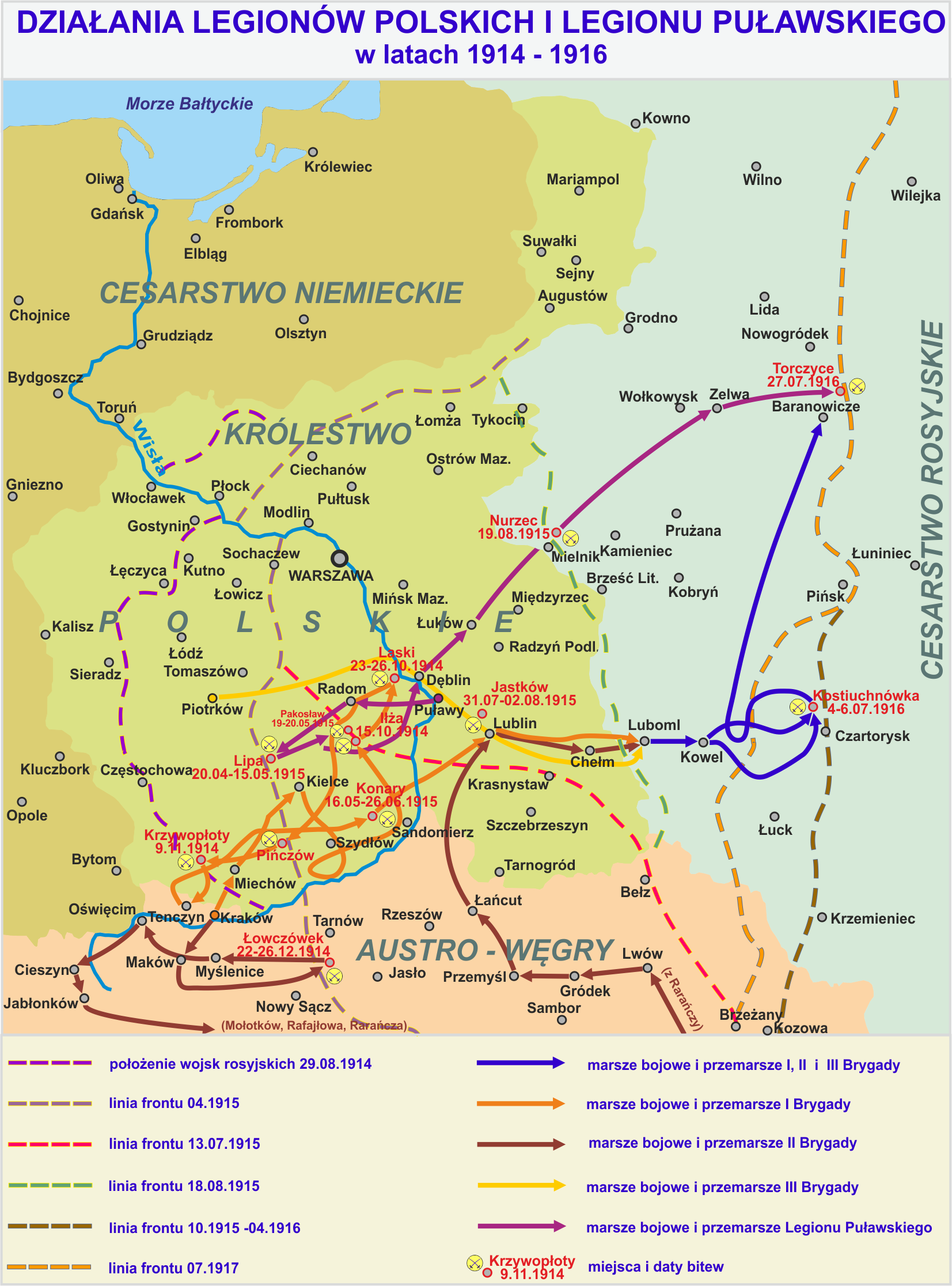

Below is a list of prominent Polish battles against the Imperial Russian Army in 1914–16, leading to victories in most cases, with notable exceptions especially during the Brusilov Offensive of 1916.

- Battle of Nowy Korczyn (23–24 September 1914)
- Battle of Laski and Anielin (21–26 October 1914)
- Battle of Mołotków (29 October 1914)
- Battle of Krzywopłoty (17–18 November 1914)
- Battle of Marcinkowice (5–6 December 1914)
- Battle of Łowczówek (22–25 December 1914)
- Battle of Pustki (2 May 1915)
- Battle of Konary (16–25 May 1915)
- Battle of Rafajłowa (23–24 January 1915)
- Kirlibaba (18–22 January 1915)
- Rarańcza (13 June 1915)
- Battle of Rokitna (15 June 1915)
- Battle of Jastków (29 July – 31 July 1915)
- Battle of Kostiuchnówka (4 July – 6 July 1916)
- Battle of Rarańcza (15–16 February 1918)

== Notable officers who served in the Polish Legions ==
Following the foundation of the Second Polish Republic, many served in the Polish Army, and held political as well as elected offices.

- Tomasz Arciszewski
- Leon Berbecki
- Zygmunt Berling
- Wacław Kostek - Biernacki
- Władysław Bortnowski
- Edmund Charaszkiewicz
- Walerian Czuma
- Bolesław Wieniawa-Długoszowski
- Gustaw Orlicz-Dreszer
- Wiktor Tomir Drymmer
- Bolesław Bronisław Duch
- Karol Durski-Trzaska
- Kazimierz Fabrycy
- Emil August Fieldorf
- Tadeusz Rozwadowski
- Michał Karaszewicz-Tokarzewski
- Tadeusz Kasprzycki
- Roman Kawecki
- Zdzisław Kawecki
- Franciszek Kleeberg
- Tadeusz Klimecki
- Bronisław Prugar-Ketling
- Tadeusz Różycki-Kołodziejczyk
- Alojzy Wir-Konas
- Stefan Kossecki
- Jan Kowalewski
- Wincenty Kowalski
- Marian Kukiel
- Julian Kulski
- Tadeusz Kurcyusz
- Józef Kustroń
- Ludwik de Laveaux (officer)
- Mieczysław Mackiewicz
- Kazimierz Mastalerz
- Henryk Minkiewicz
- Józef Dowbor-Muśnicki
- Mieczyslaw Norwid-Neugebauer
- Leopold Okulicki
- Kazimierz Orlik-Łukoski
- Wilhelm Orlik-Rückemann
- Antoni Pająk
- Witold Pilecki
- Tadeusz Piskor
- Władysław Belina-Prażmowski
- Tadeusz Puszczyński
- Bronisław Rakowski
- Ludomił Rayski
- Bolesław Roja
- Juliusz Rómmel
- Stanisław Grzmot-Skotnicki
- Piotr Skuratowicz
- Edward Rydz-Śmigły
- Mieczysław Smorawiński
- Kazimierz Sosnkowski
- Mieczysław Boruta-Spiechowicz
- Julian Stachiewicz
- Wacław Stachiewicz
- Kazimierz Stamirowski
- Stefan Starzyński
- Aleksander Stawarz
- Zygmunt Bohusz-Szyszko
- Wiktor Thommée
- Władysław Wejtko
- Bolesław Wieniawa-Długoszowski
- Józef Olszyna-Wilczyński
- Jan Włodarkiewicz
- Włodzimierz Zagórski (general)
- Józef Zając
- Ferdynand Zarzycki
- Marian Januszajtis-Żegota
- Lucjan Żeligowski
- Juliusz Zulauf
- Michał Rola-Żymierski
- Franciszek Owsiany

== Polish Legions' prominent members ==
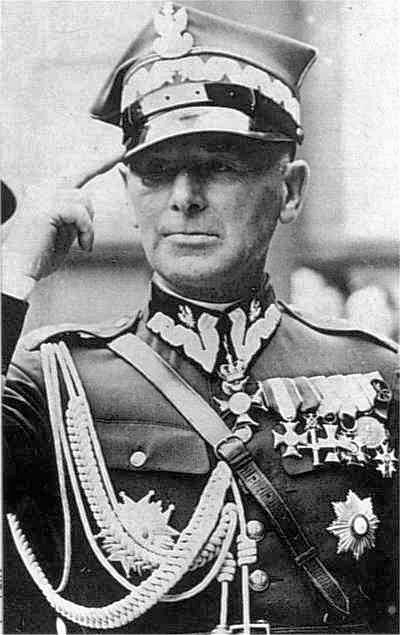
Edward Śmigły-Rydz

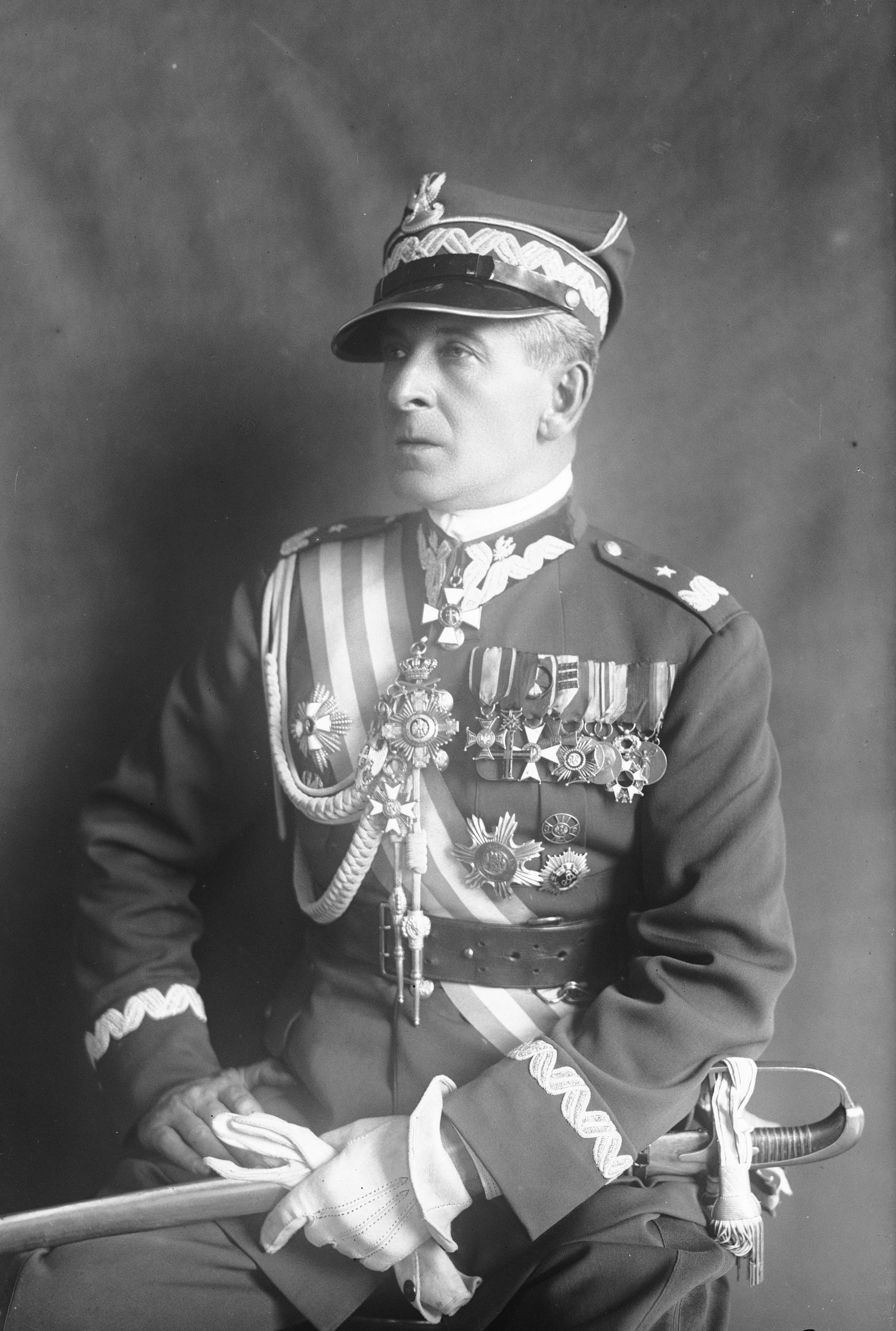
Bolesław Wieniawa-Długoszowski

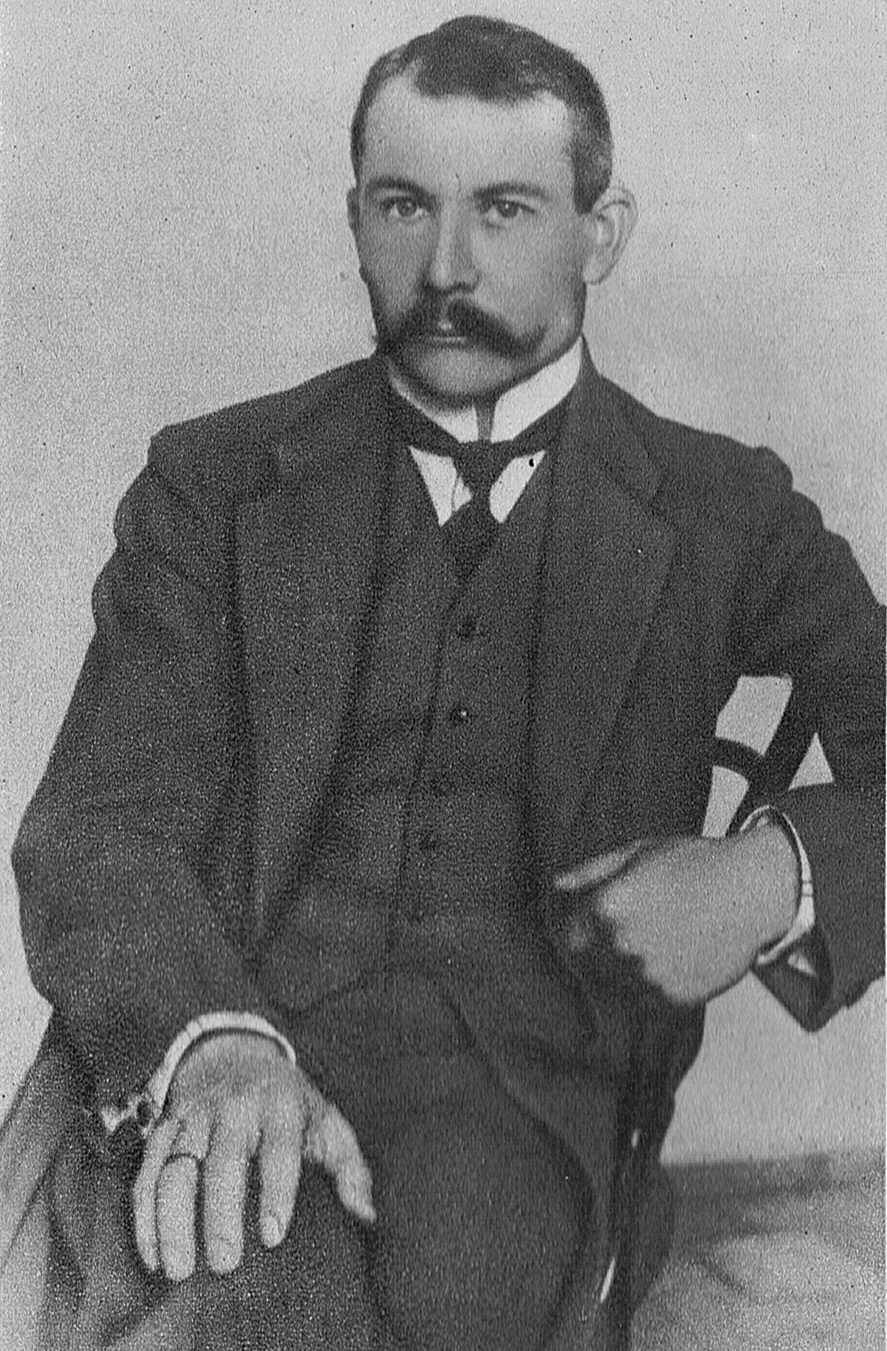
Tomasz Arciszewski

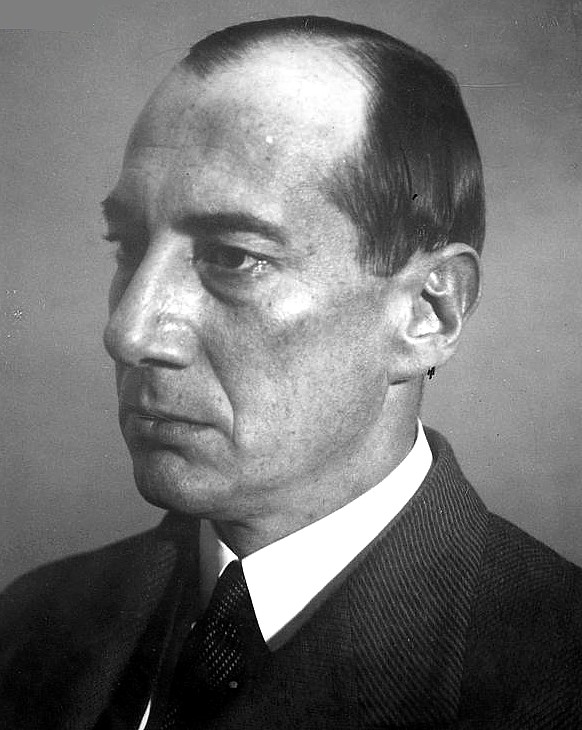
Józef Beck

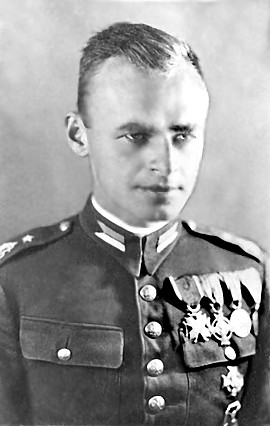
Witold Pilecki

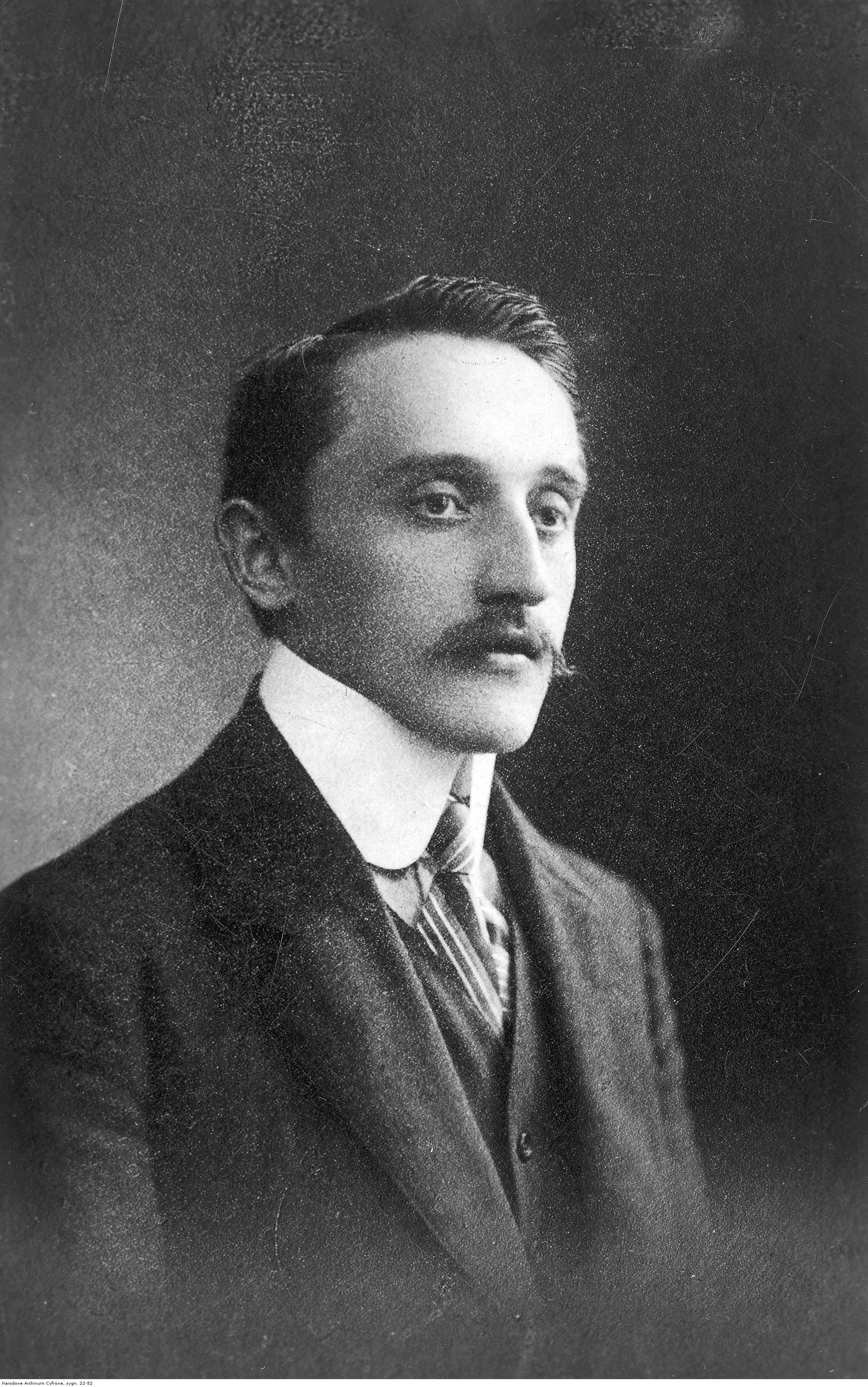
Wacław Kostek - Biernacki

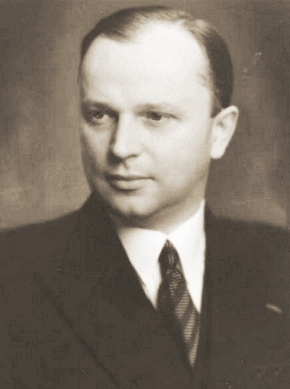
Tadeusz Brzeziński

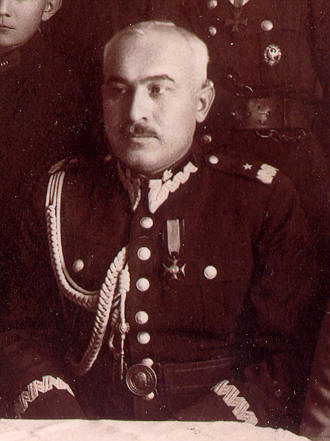
Walerian Czuma

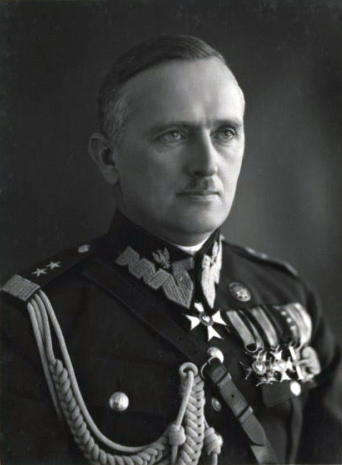
Stefan Dąb-Biernacki

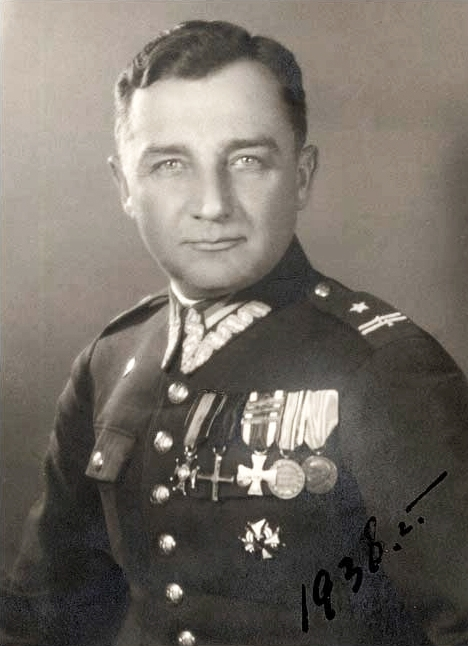
Henryk Dobrzański

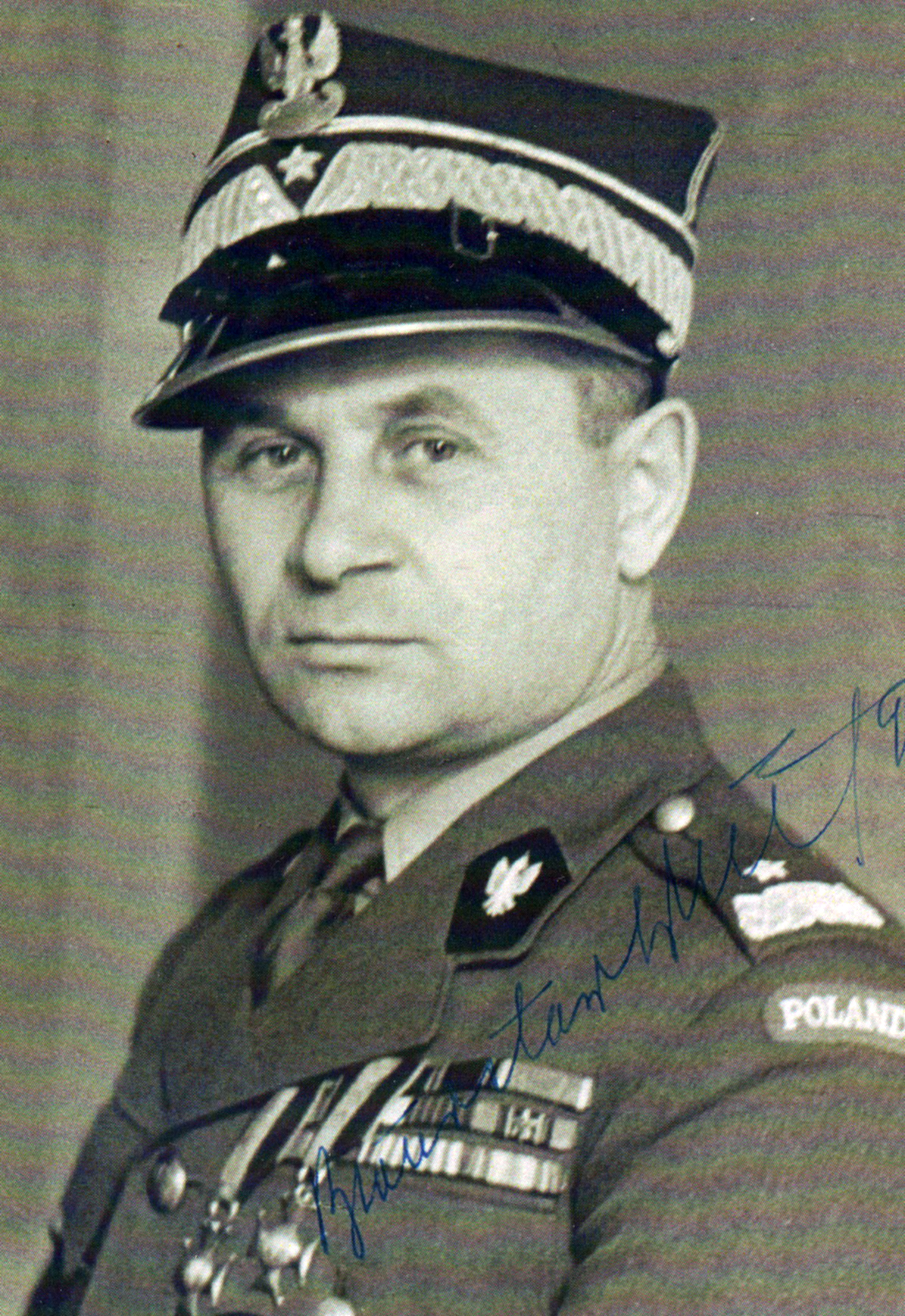
Bronisław Duch

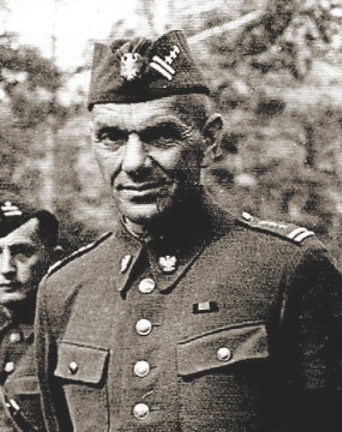
Zygmunt Berling

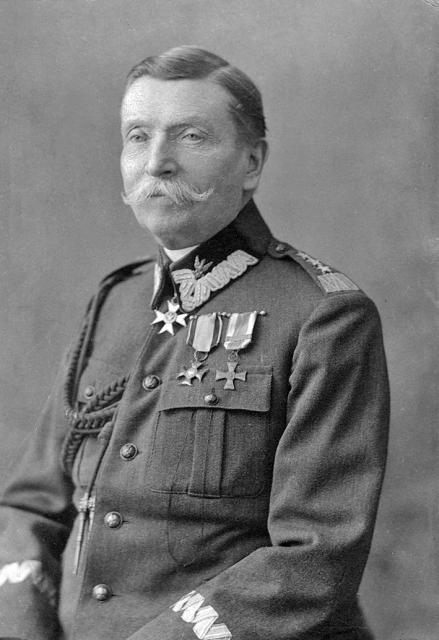
Karol Durski-Trzaska

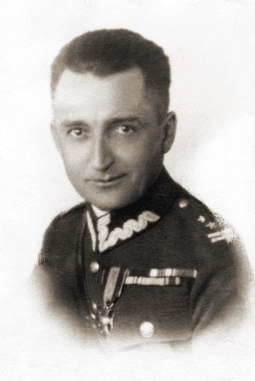
Emil Fieldorf

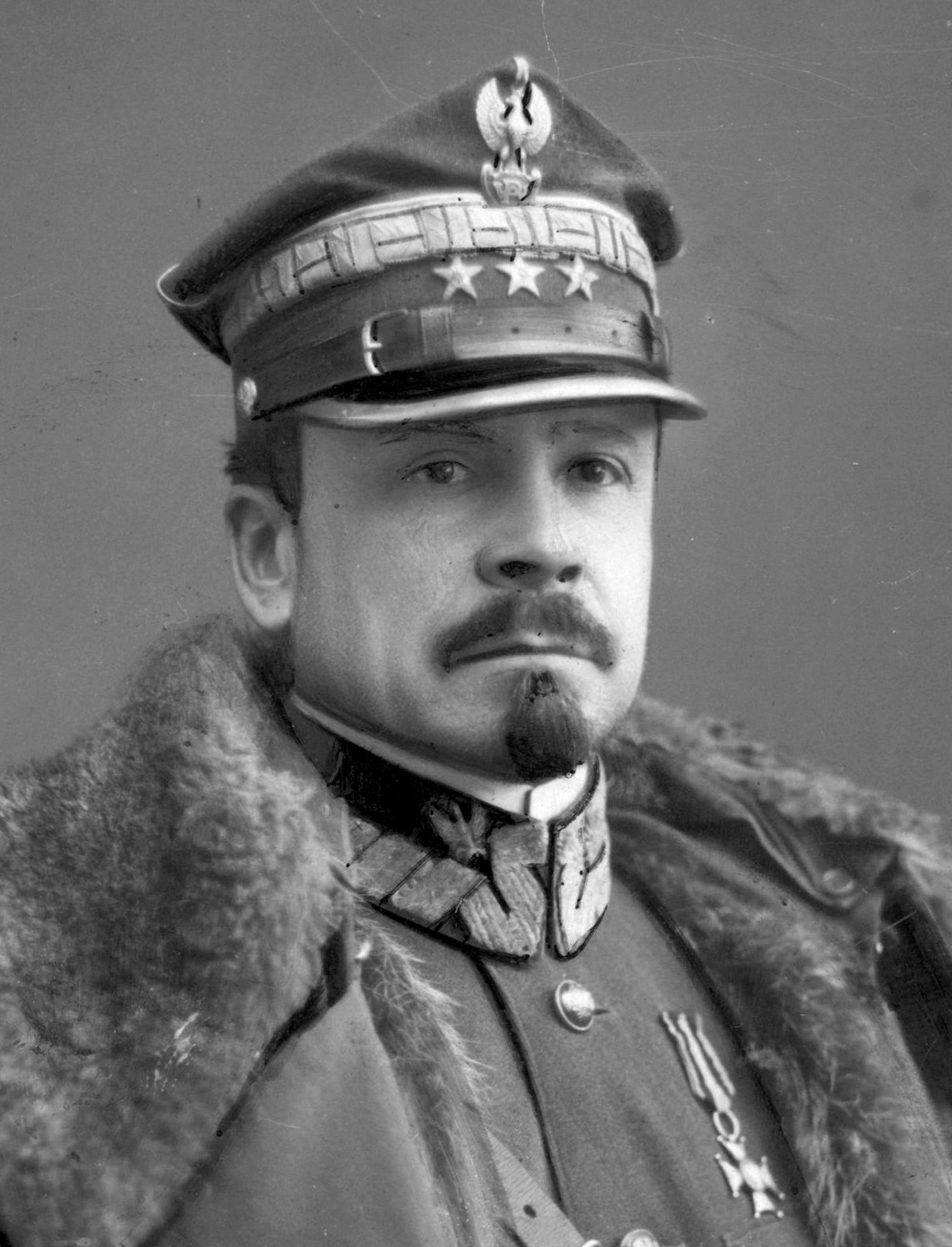
Józef Haller de Hallenburg who commanded II Brigade

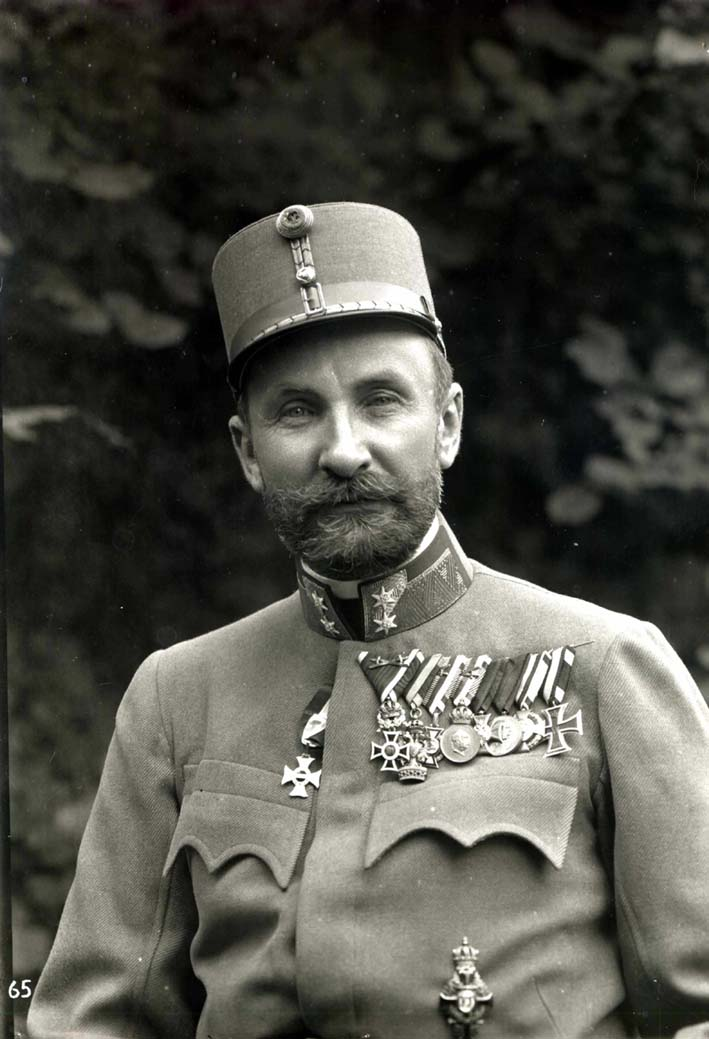
Tadeusz Jordan-Rozwadowski in an Austro-Hungarian military uniform, 1918

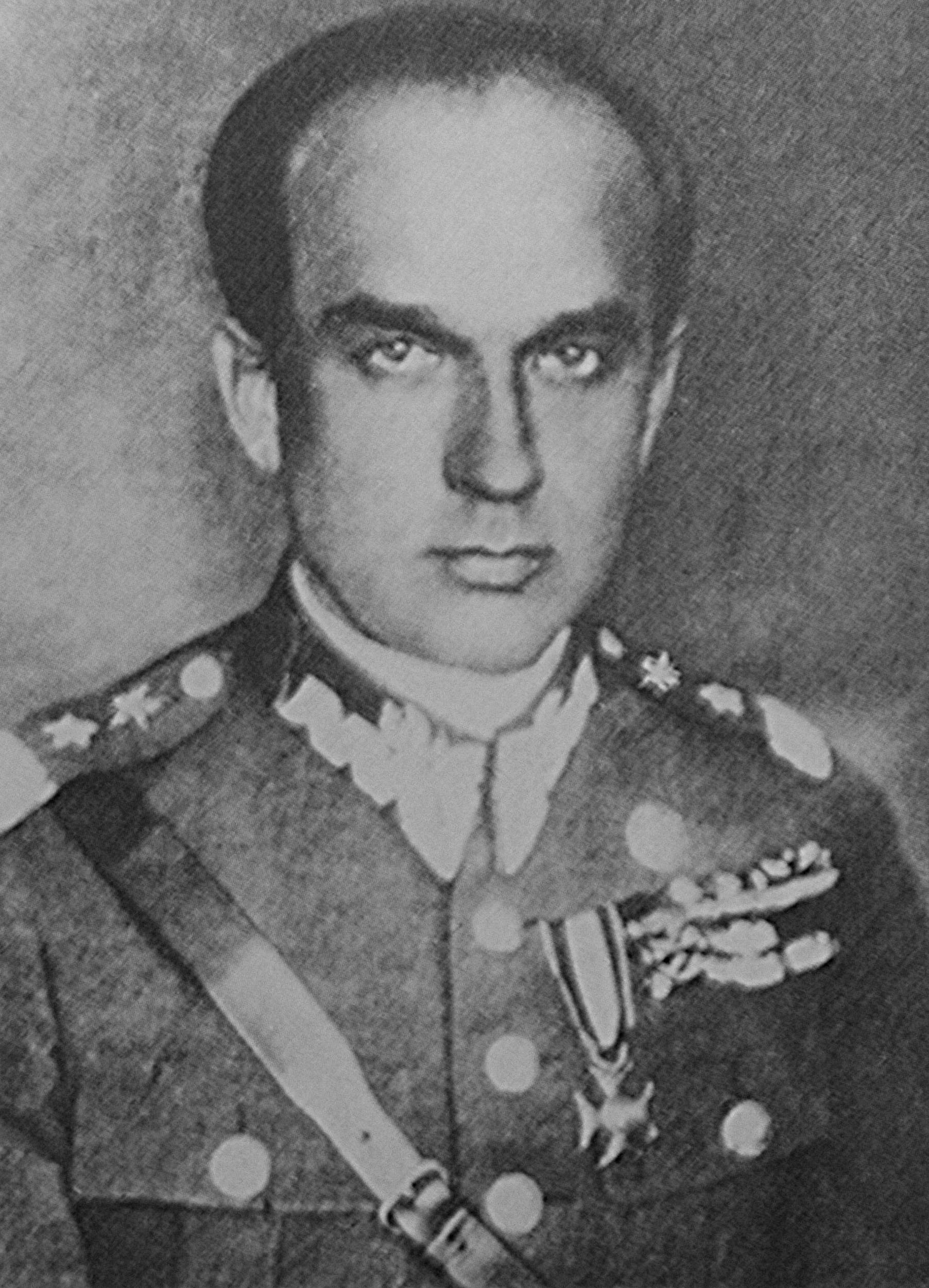
Tadeusz Kasprzycki

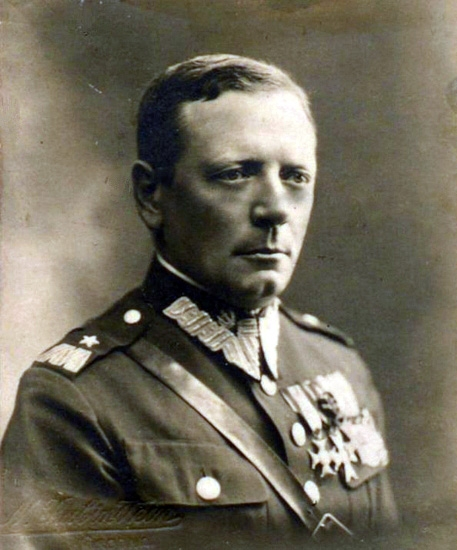
Franciszek Kleeberg

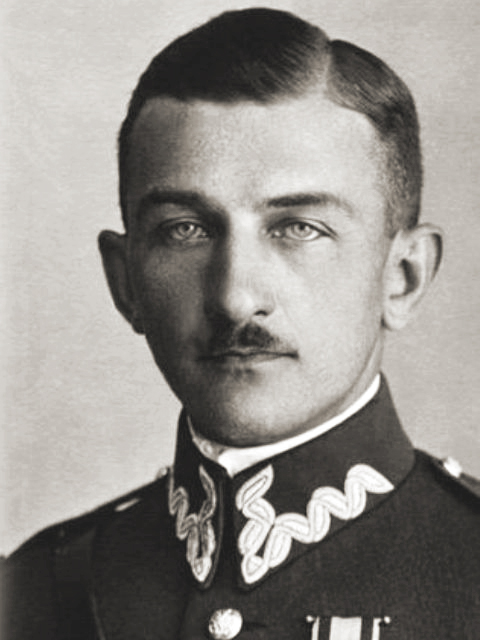
Tadeusz Klimecki

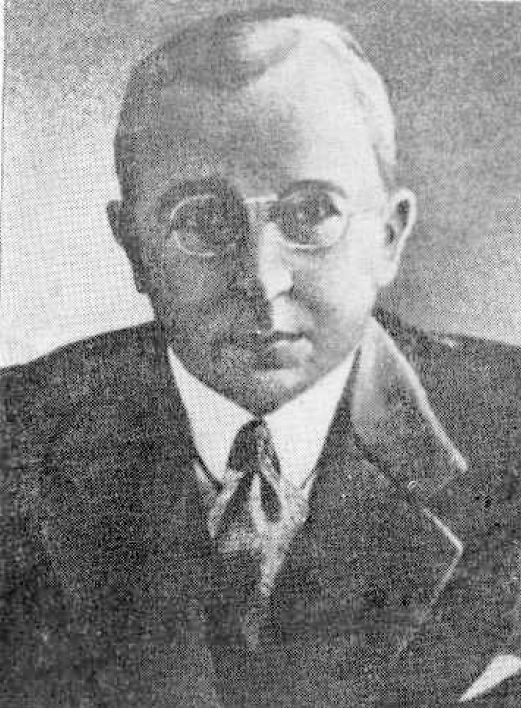
Adam Koc

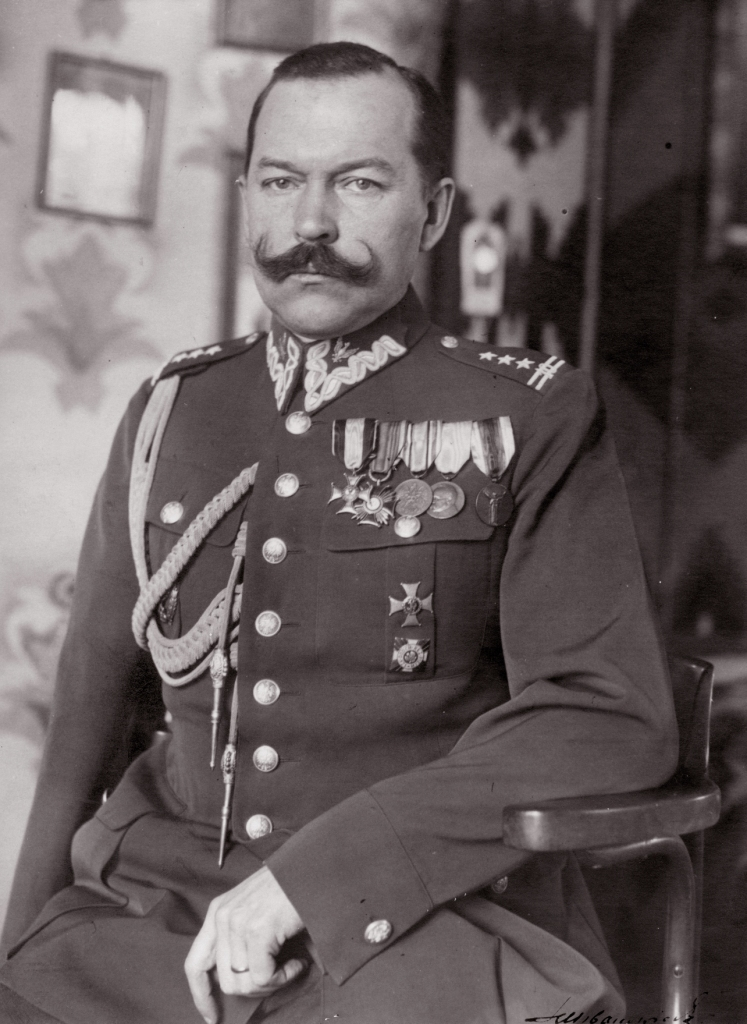
Stefan Kossecki

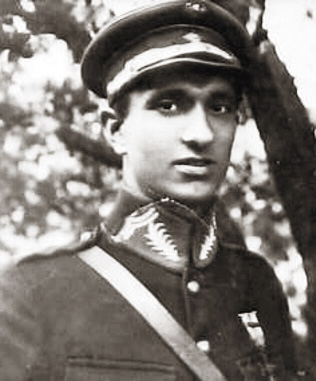
Marian Kozielewski

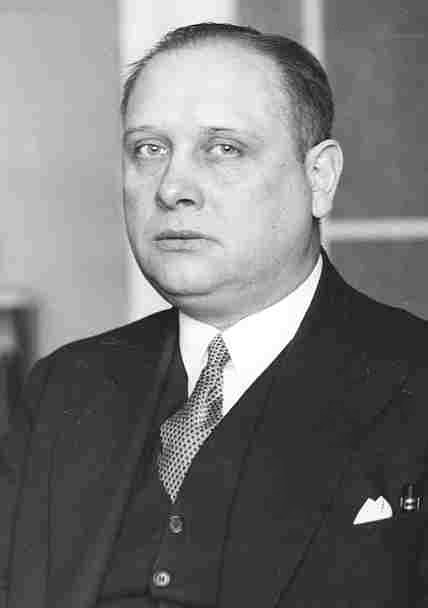
Julian Kulski

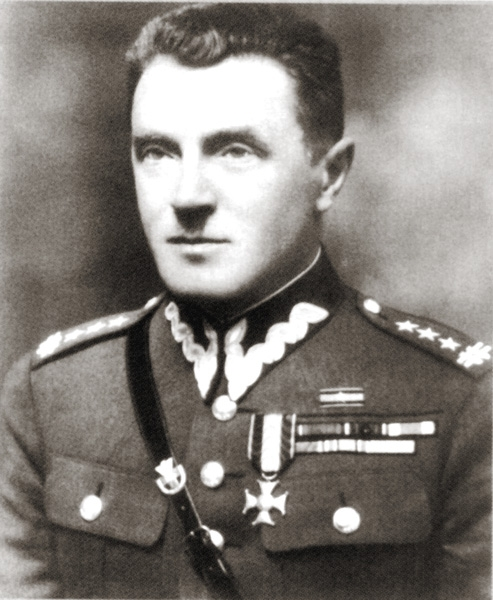
Józef Kustroń

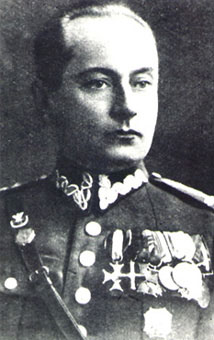
Kazimierz Mastalerz

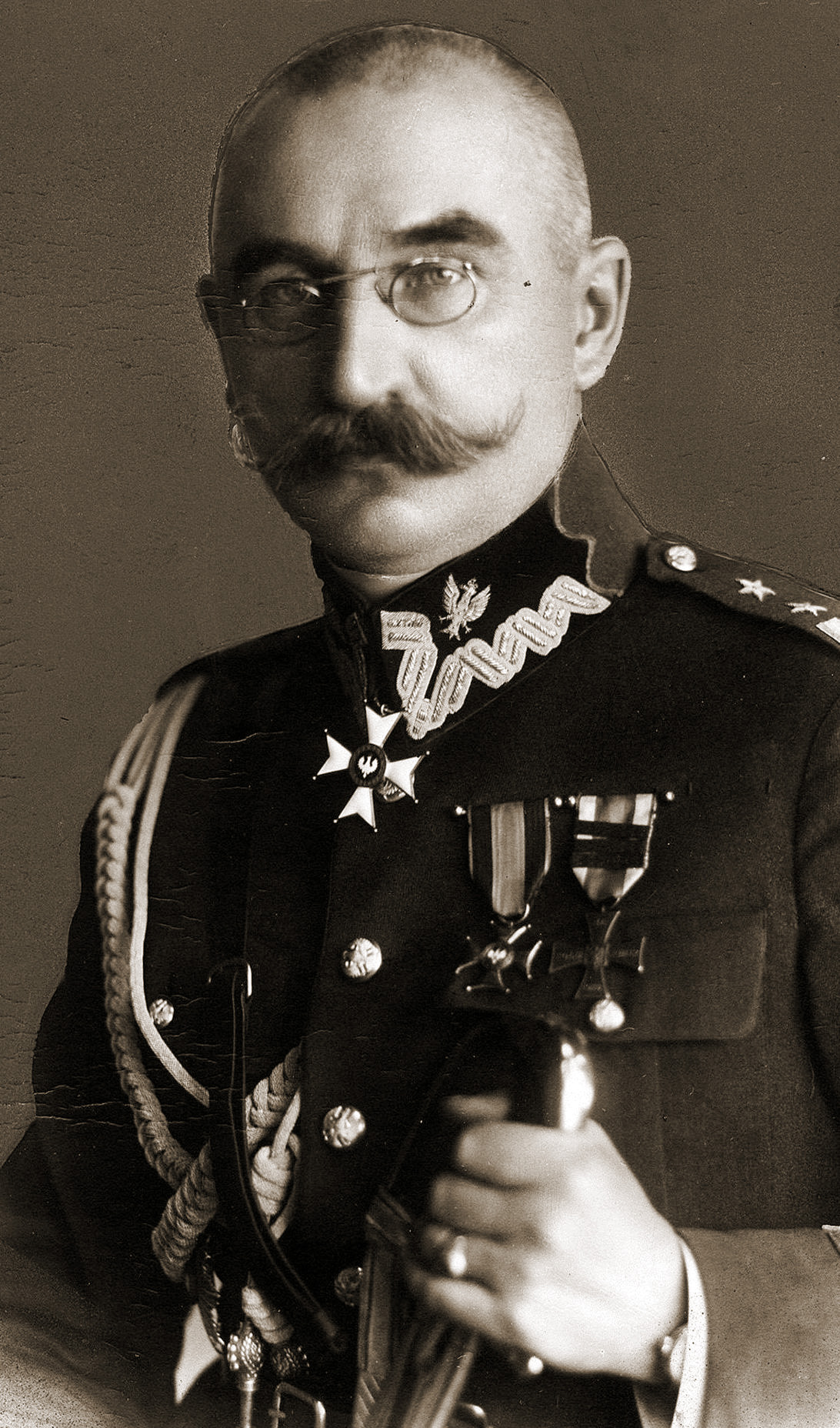
Henryk Minkiewicz

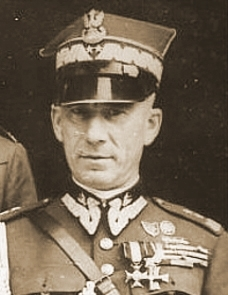
Mieczyslaw Norwid-Neugebauer who commanded 6th Regiment and 3rd Brigade

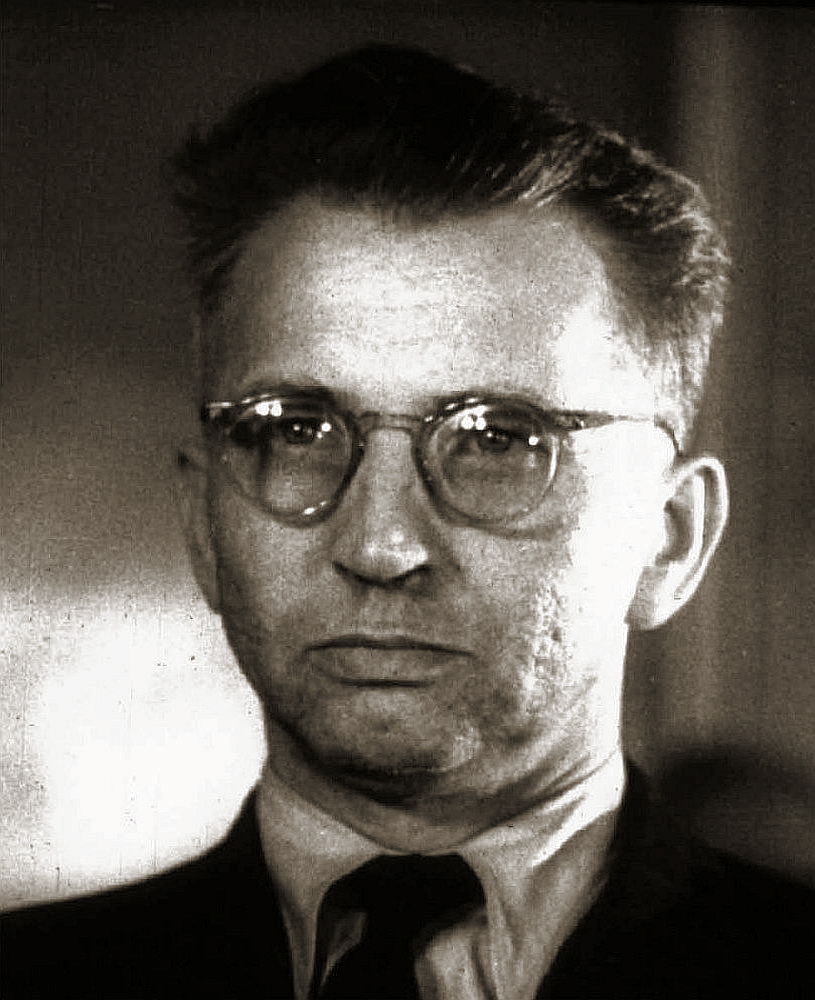
Leopold Okulicki who served in 3rd Legions Infantry Regiment

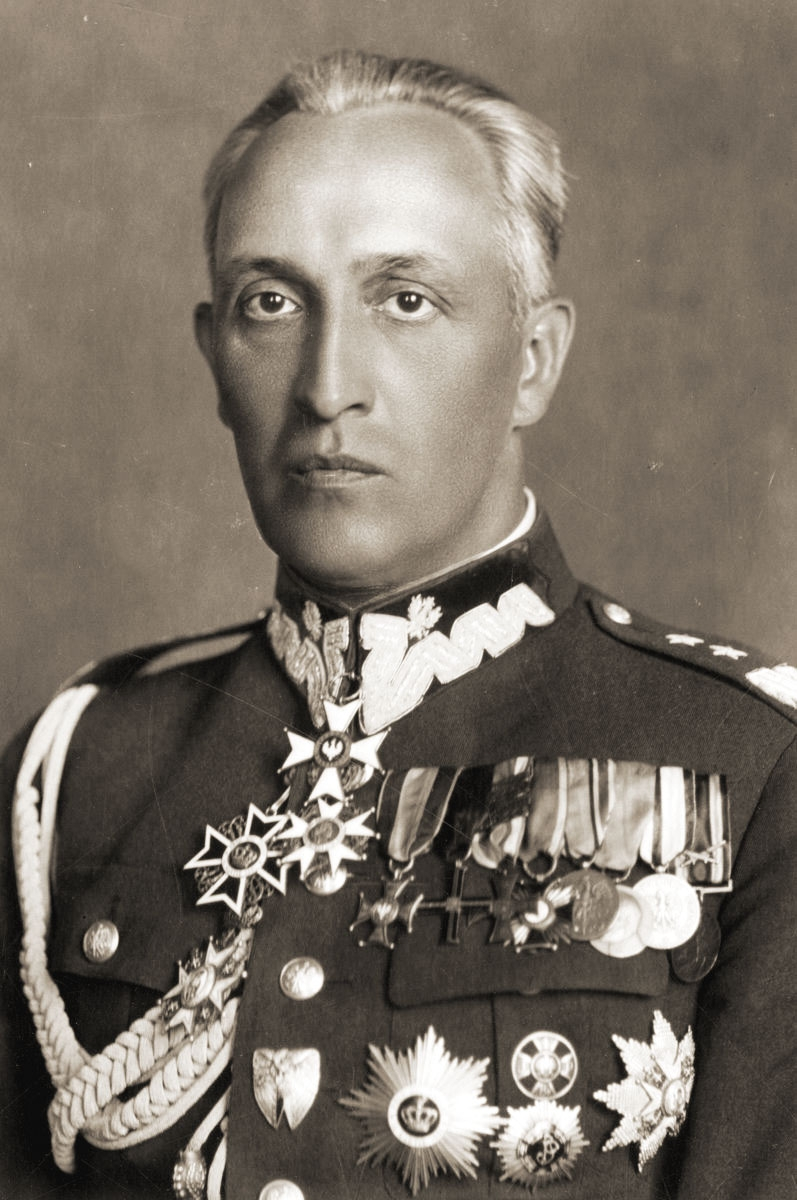
Gustaw Orlicz-Dreszer

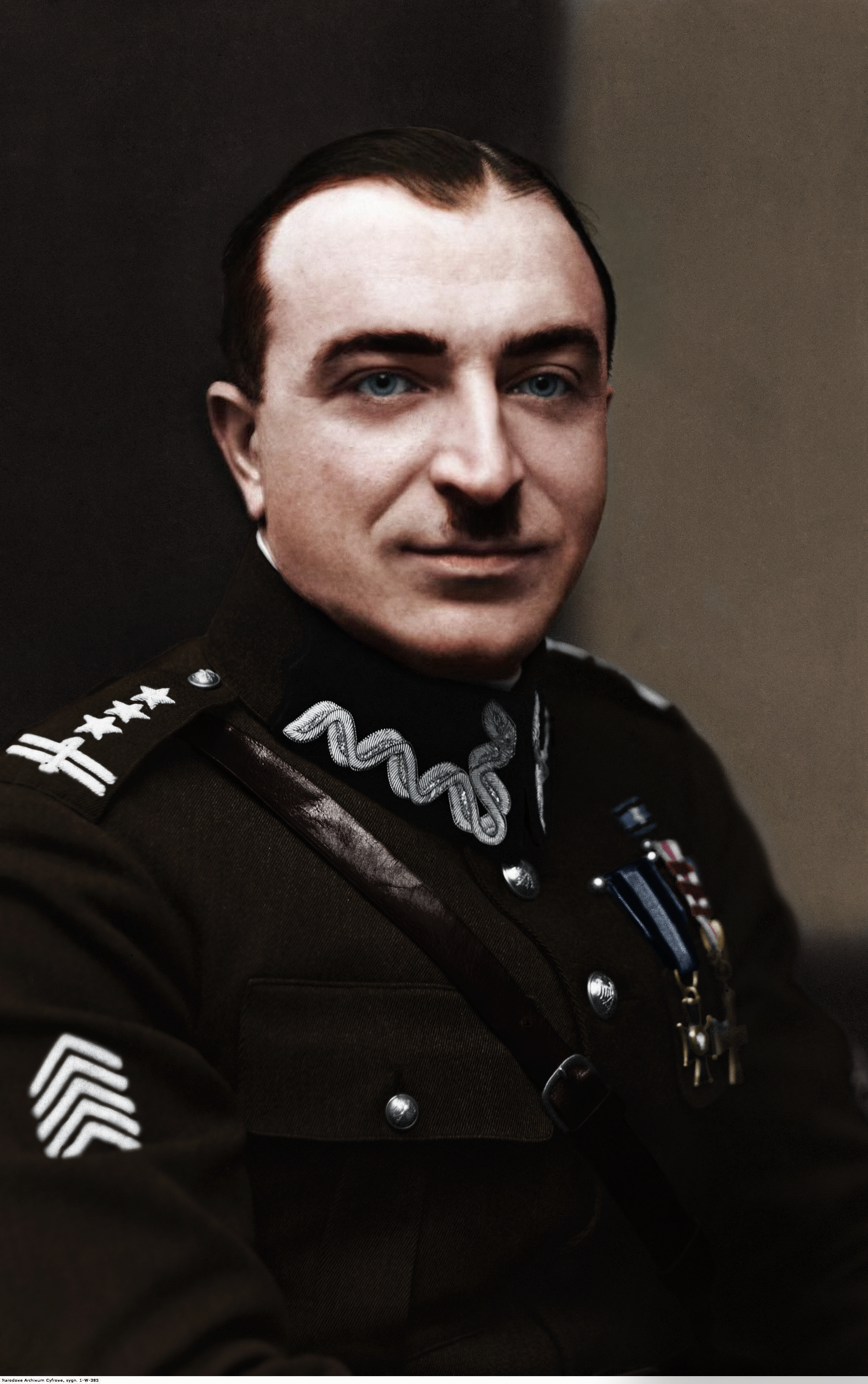
Wilhelm Orlik-Rückemann

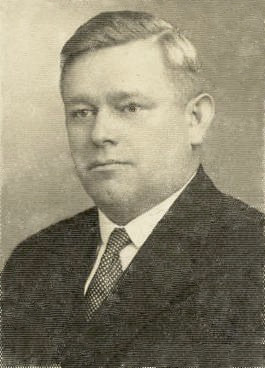
Antoni Pająk

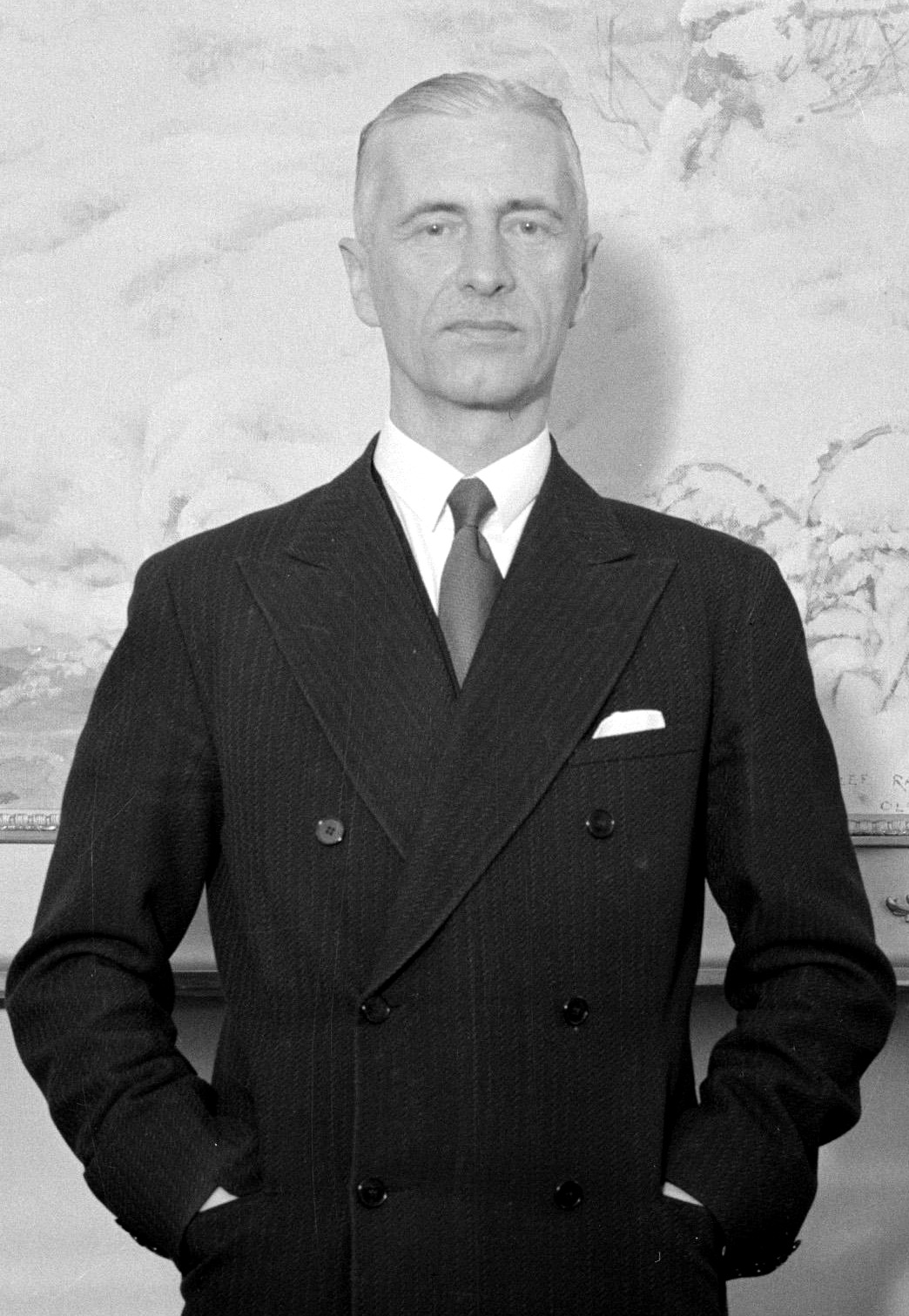
Władysław Raczkiewicz (President of Poland)

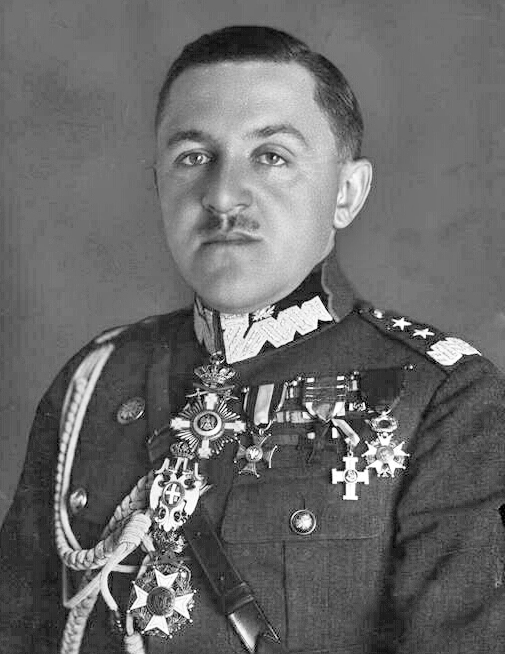
Tadeusz Piskor

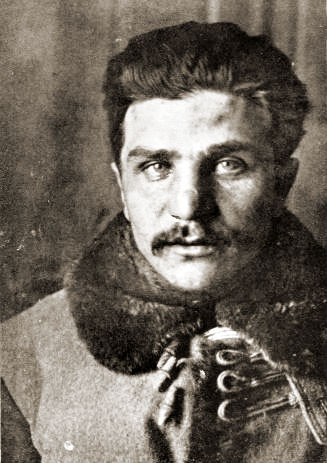
Władysław Belina-Prażmowski

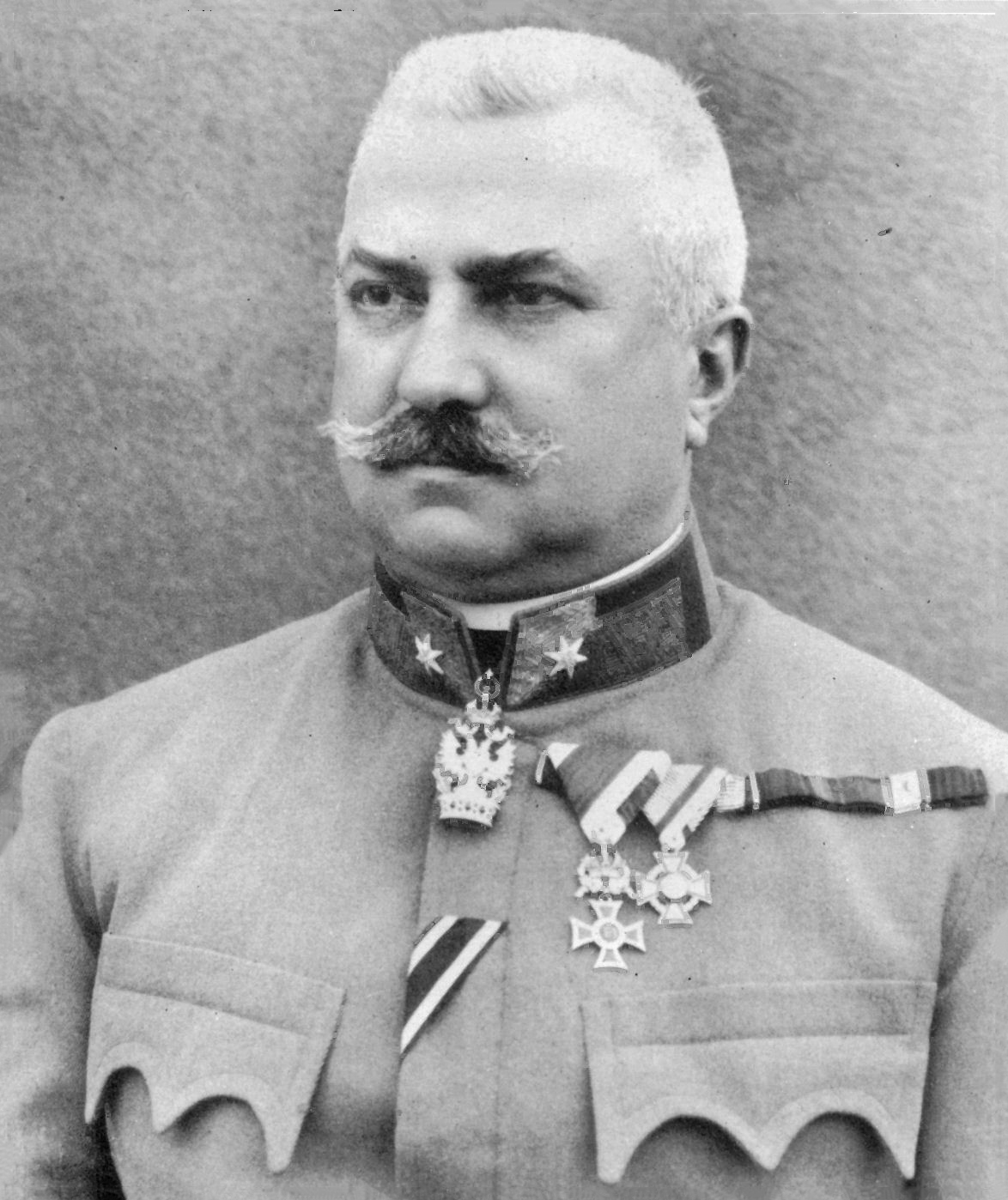
Stanisław Puchalski

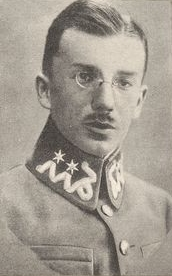
Tadeusz Różycki-Kołodziejczyk

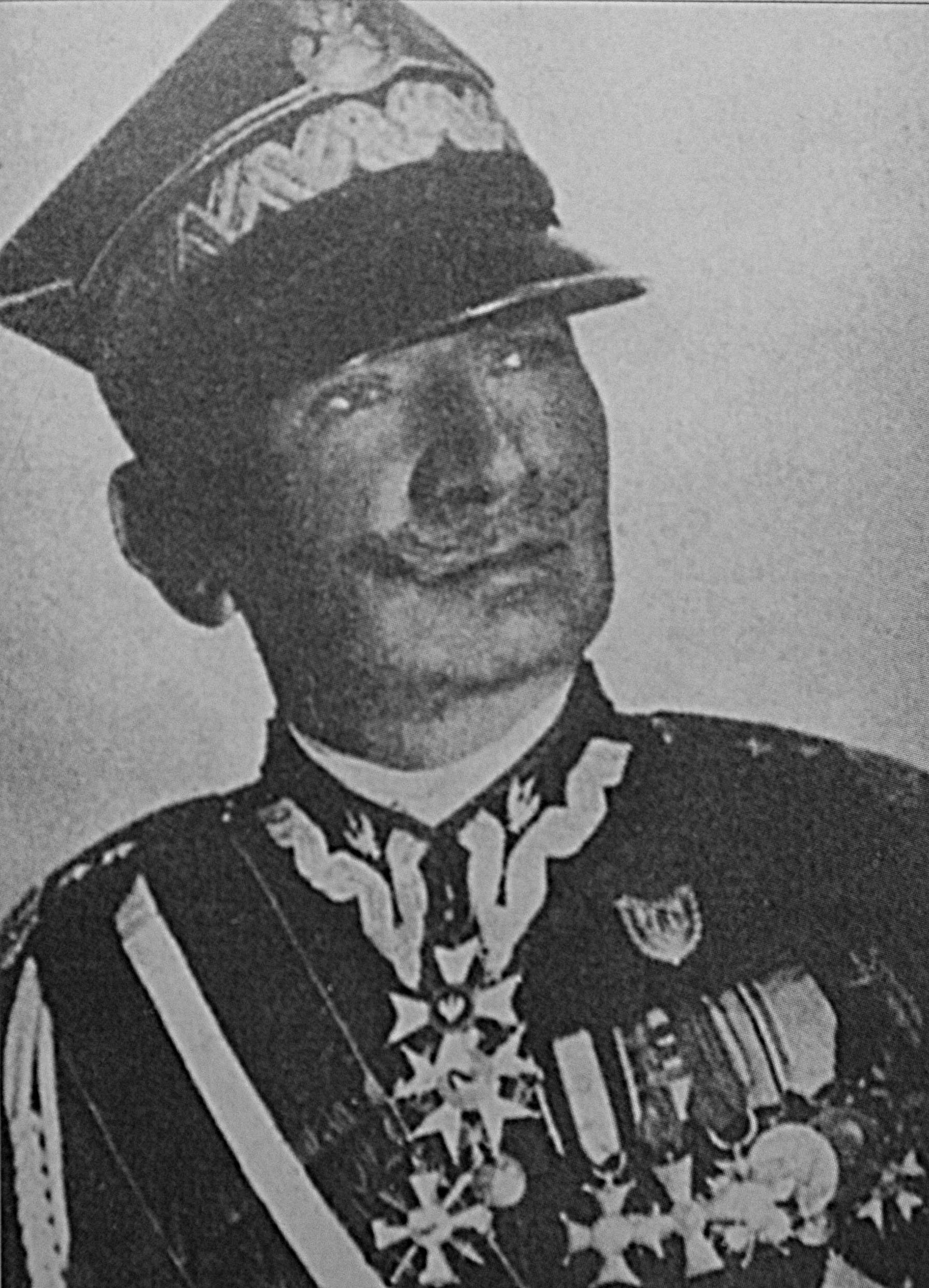
Juliusz Rómmel

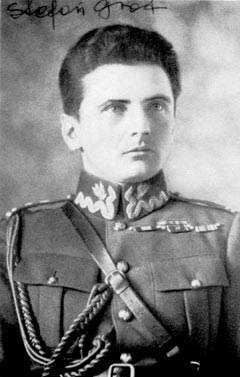
Stefan Rowecki

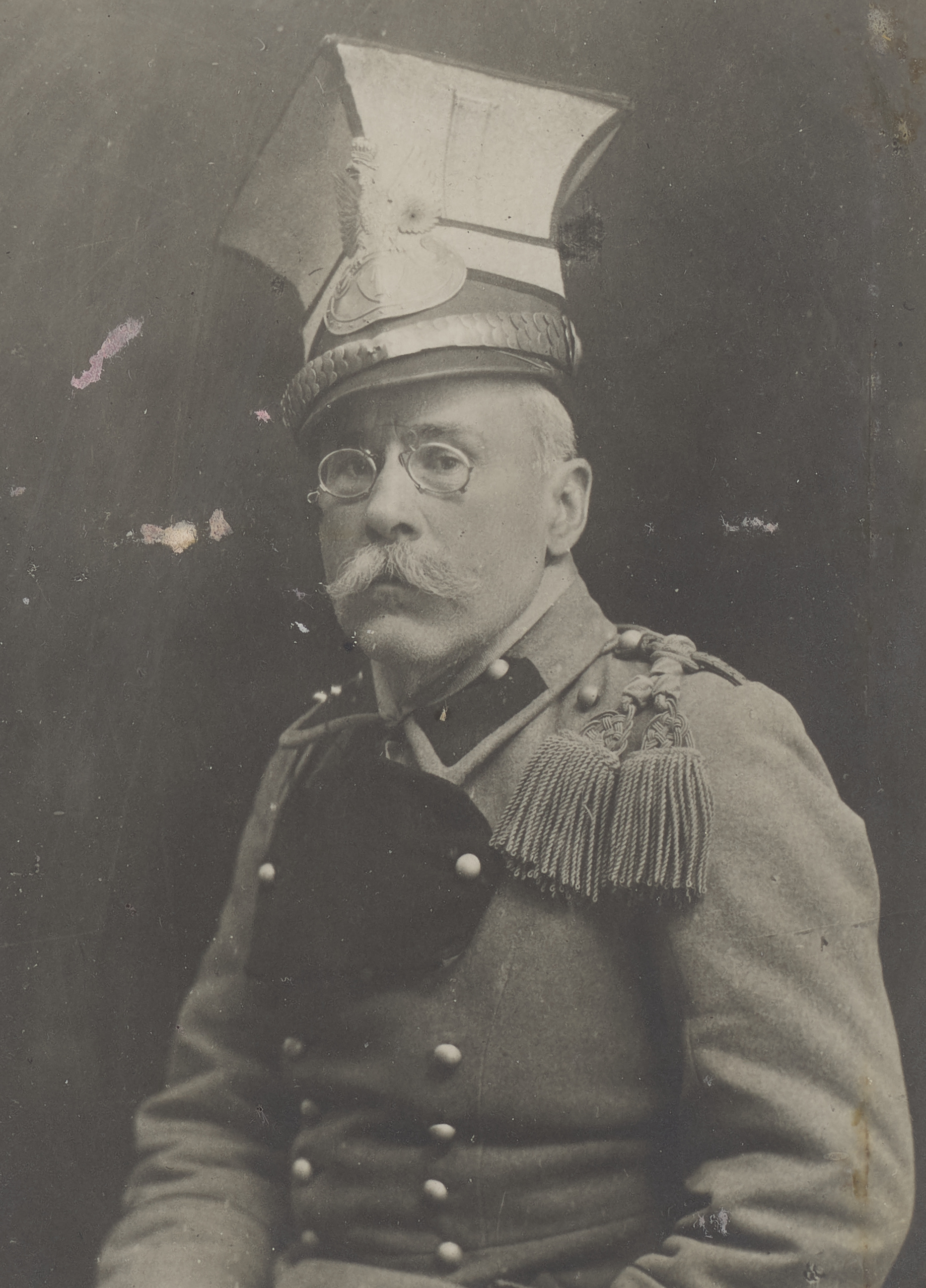
Waclaw Sieroszewski

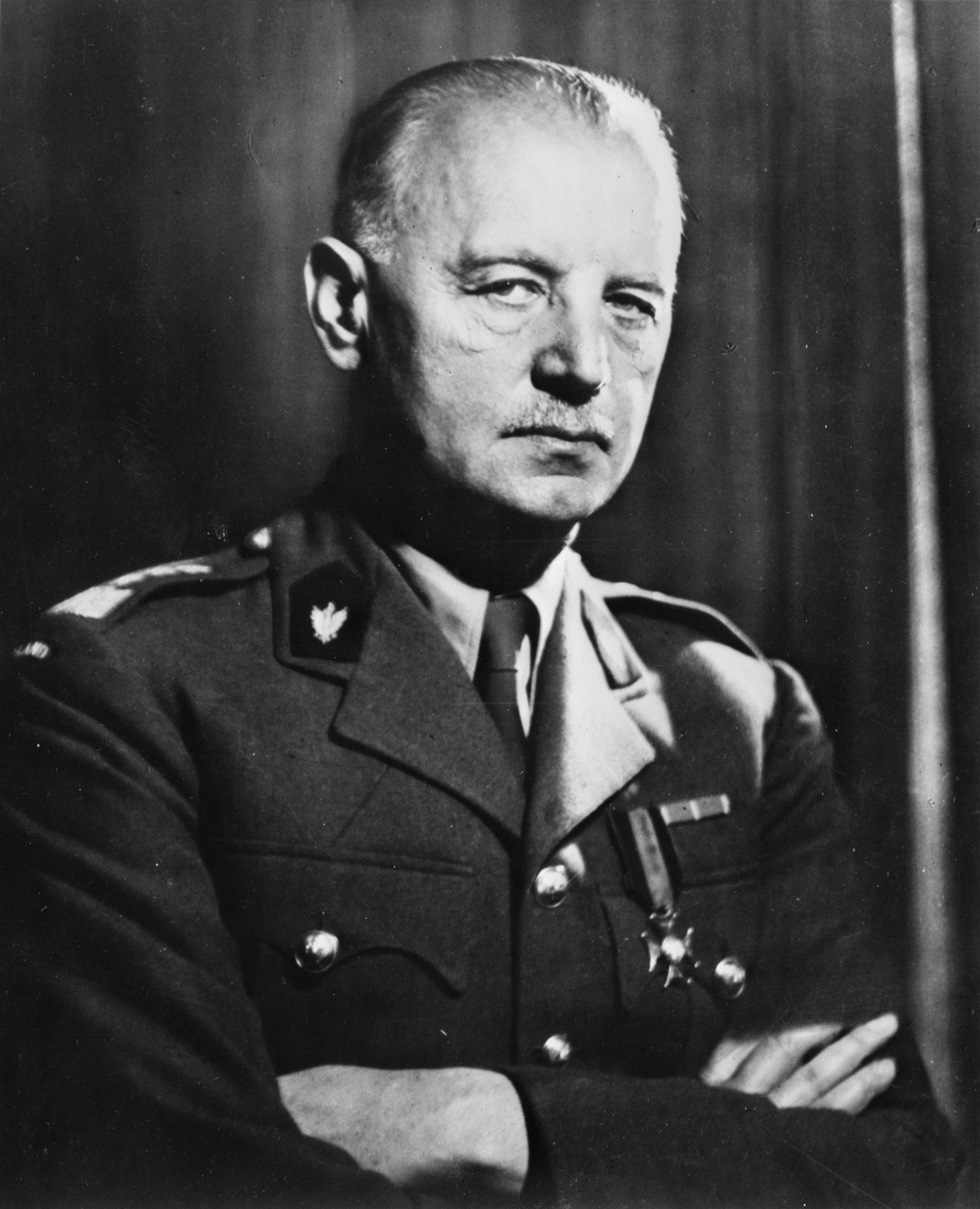
Władysław Sikorski

Piotr Skuratowicz

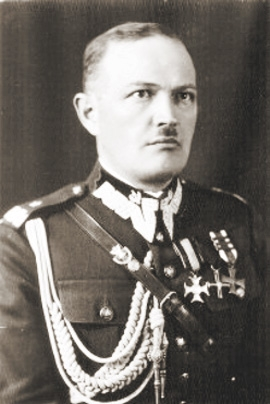
Mieczysław Smorawiński

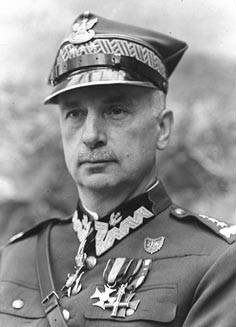
Kazimierz Sosnkowski

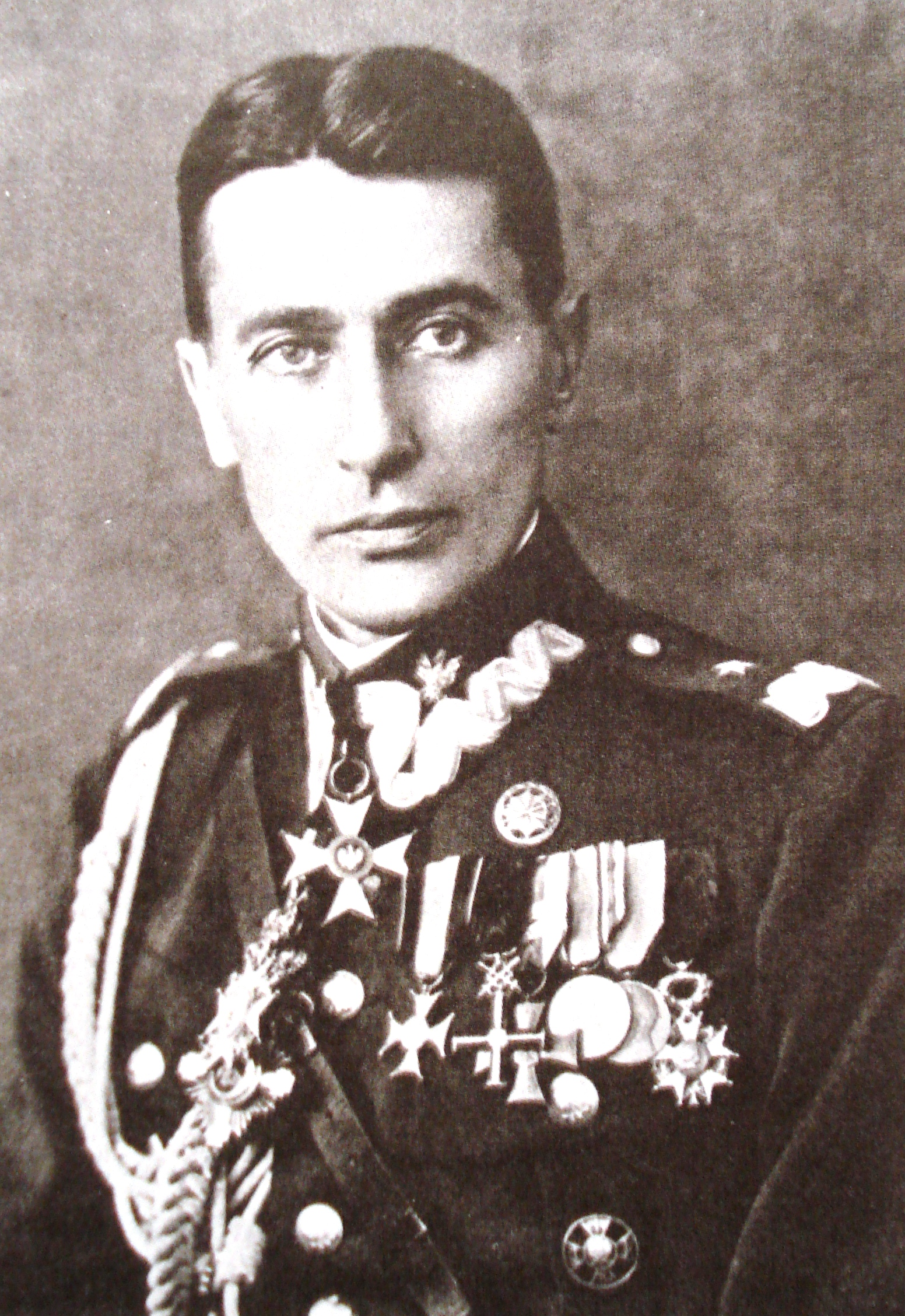
Julian Stachiewicz

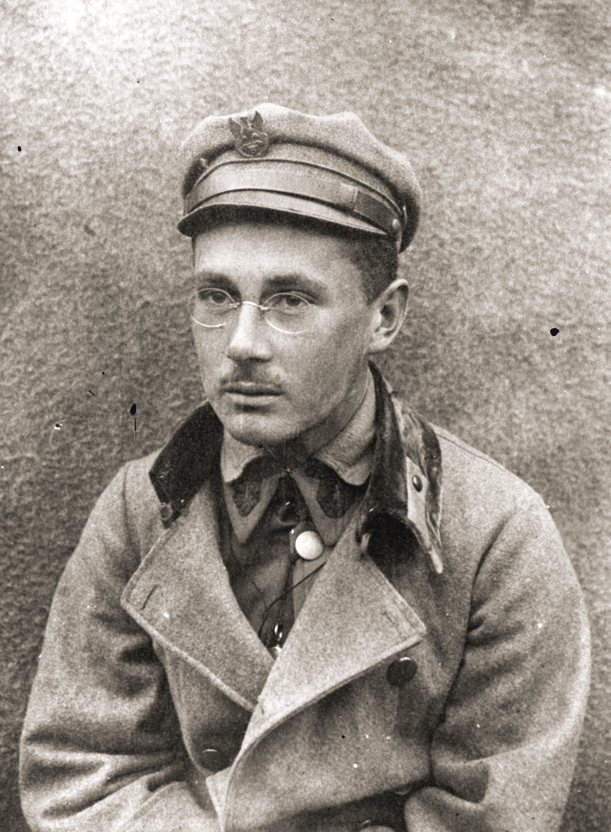
Wacław Stachiewicz in 1917, after the Oath Crisis

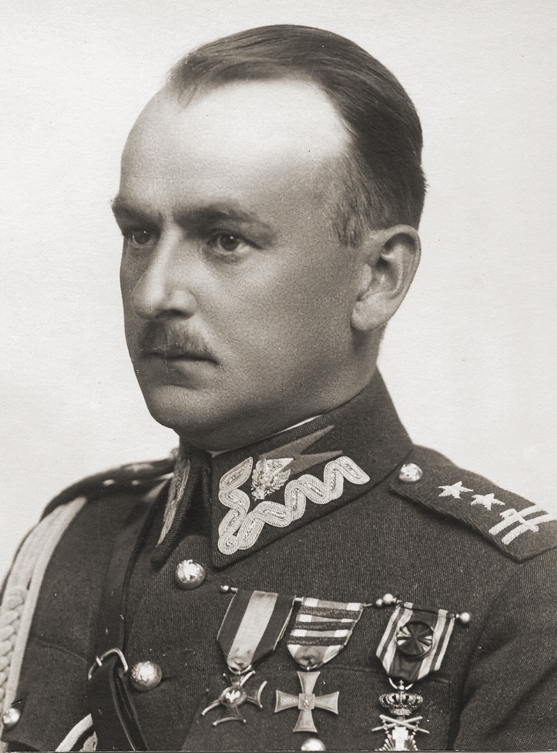
Kazimierz Stamirowski

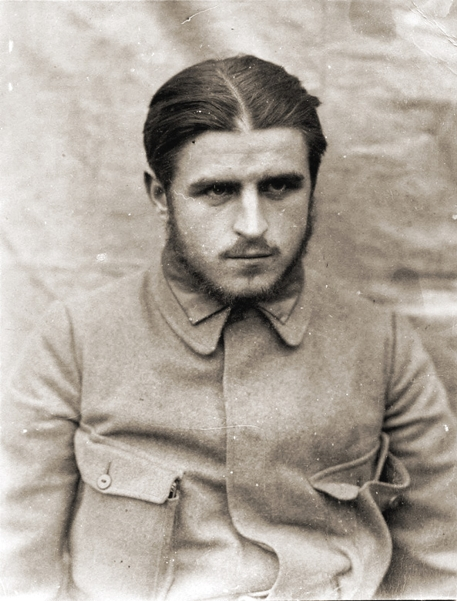
Stefan Starzyński

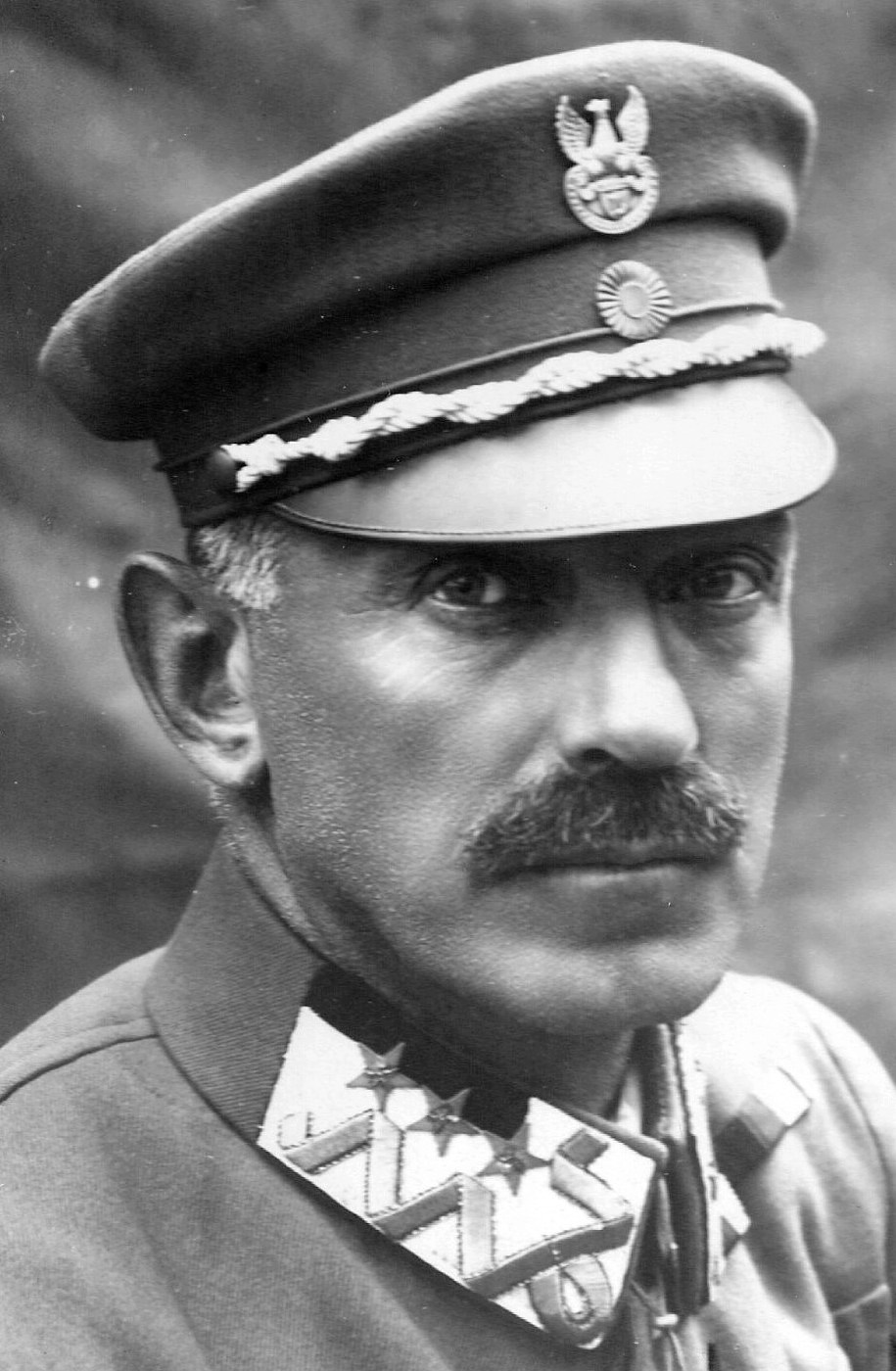
Stanisław Szeptycki.

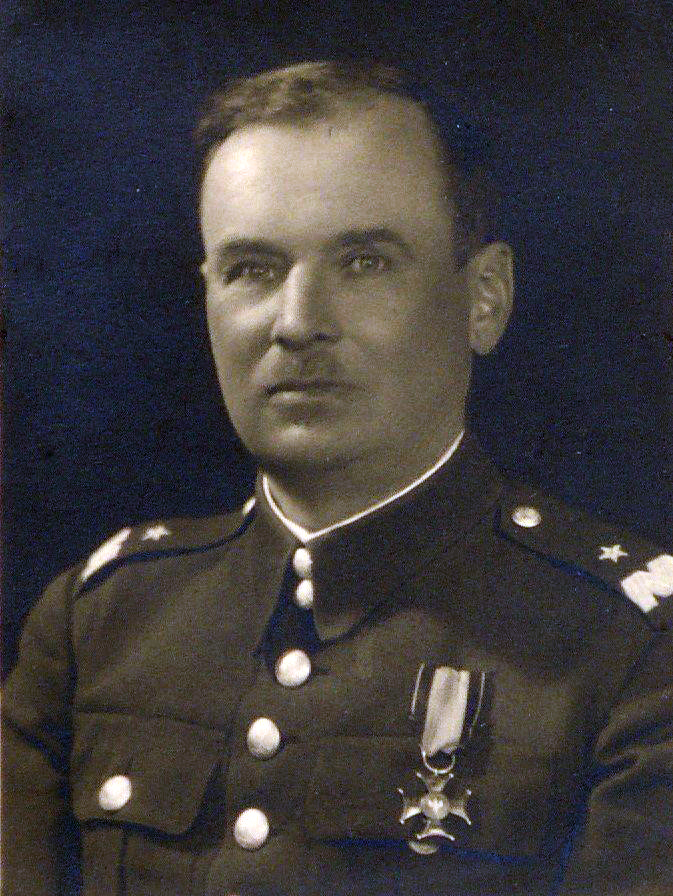
Wiktor Thommée

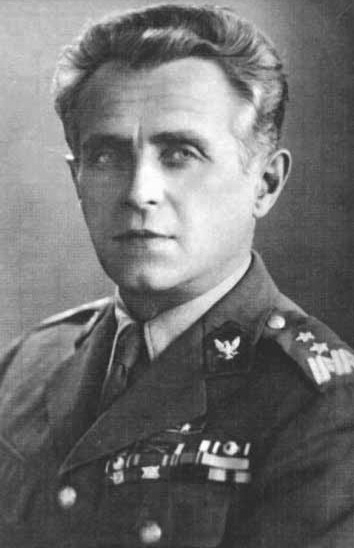
Michał Karaszewicz-Tokarzewski

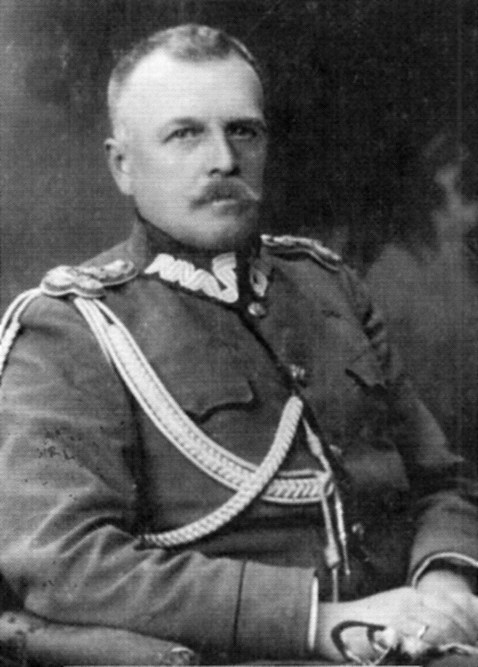
Władysław Wejtko

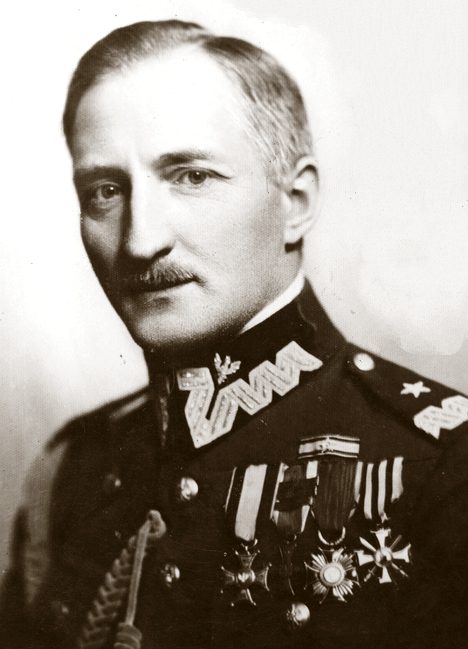
Józef Olszyna-Wilczyński

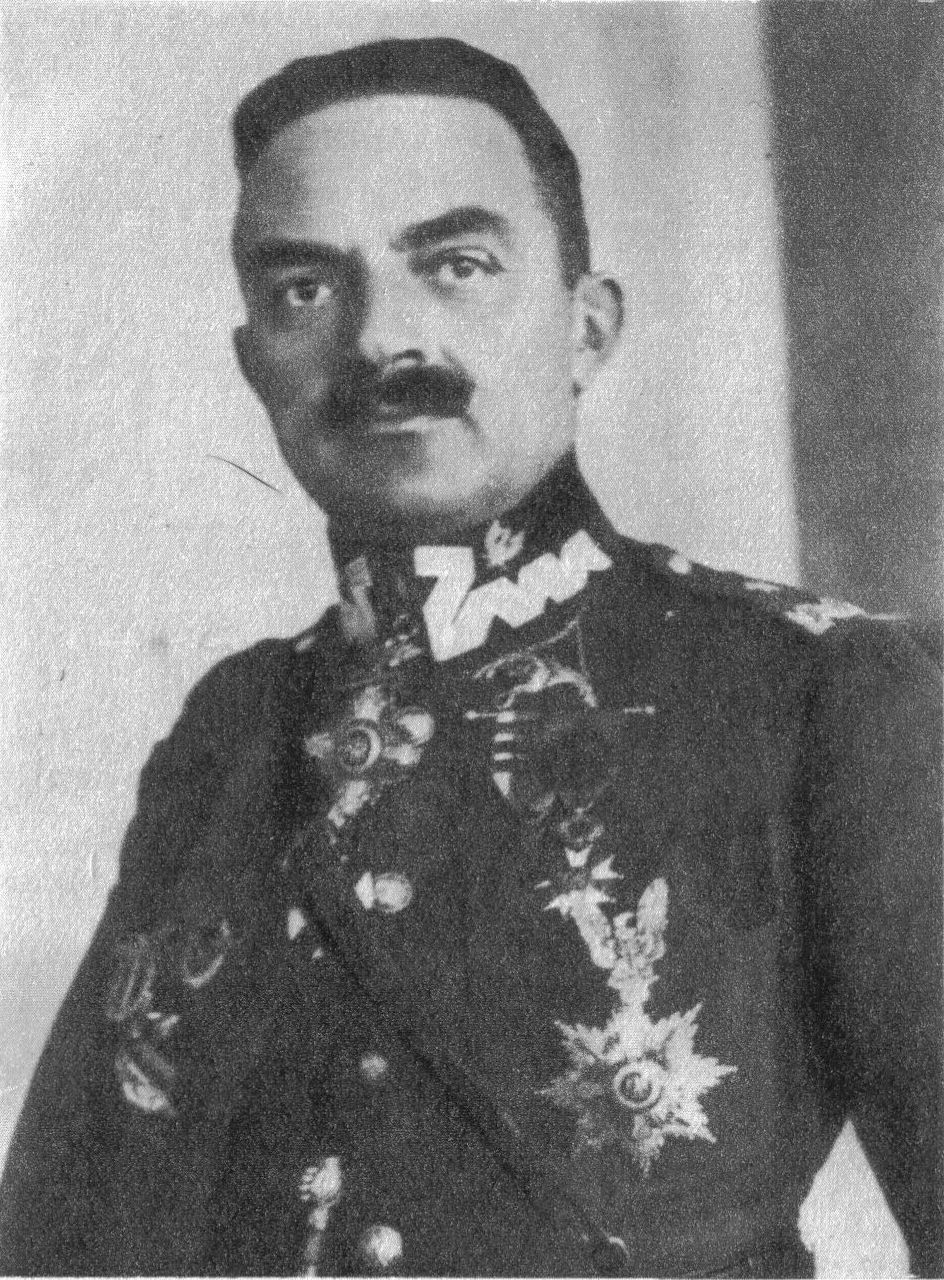
Włodzimierz Zagórski (general)

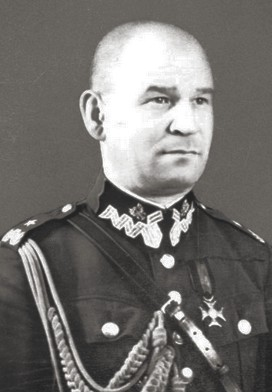
Józef Zając

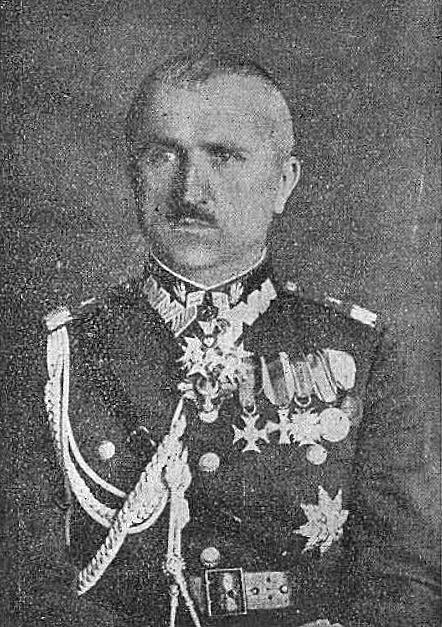
Ferdynand Zarzycki

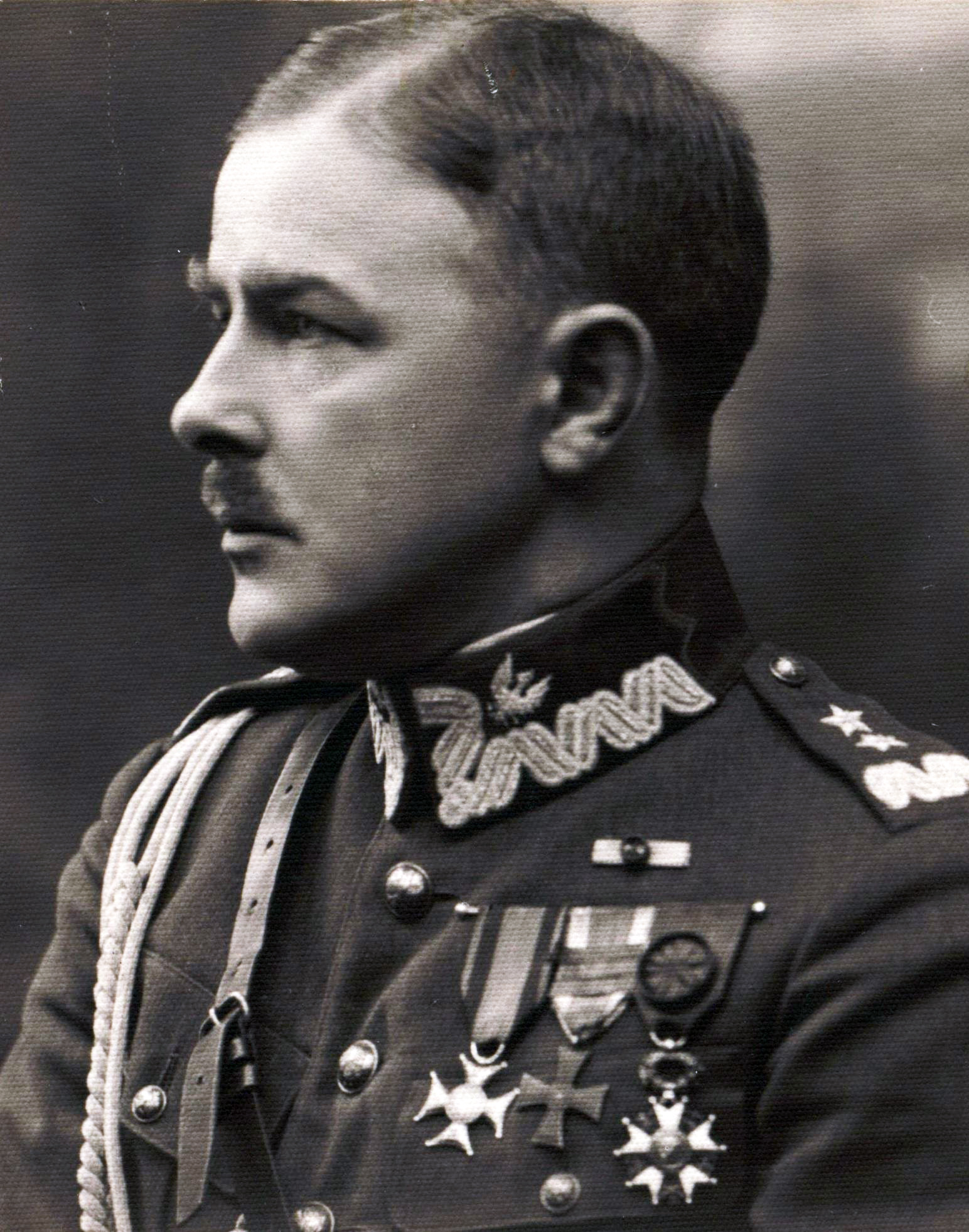
Marian Januszajtis-Żegota

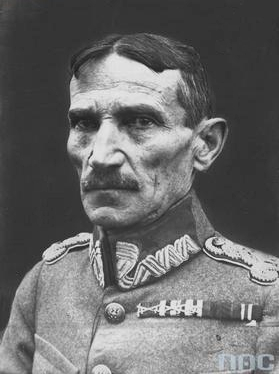
Zygmunt Zieliński

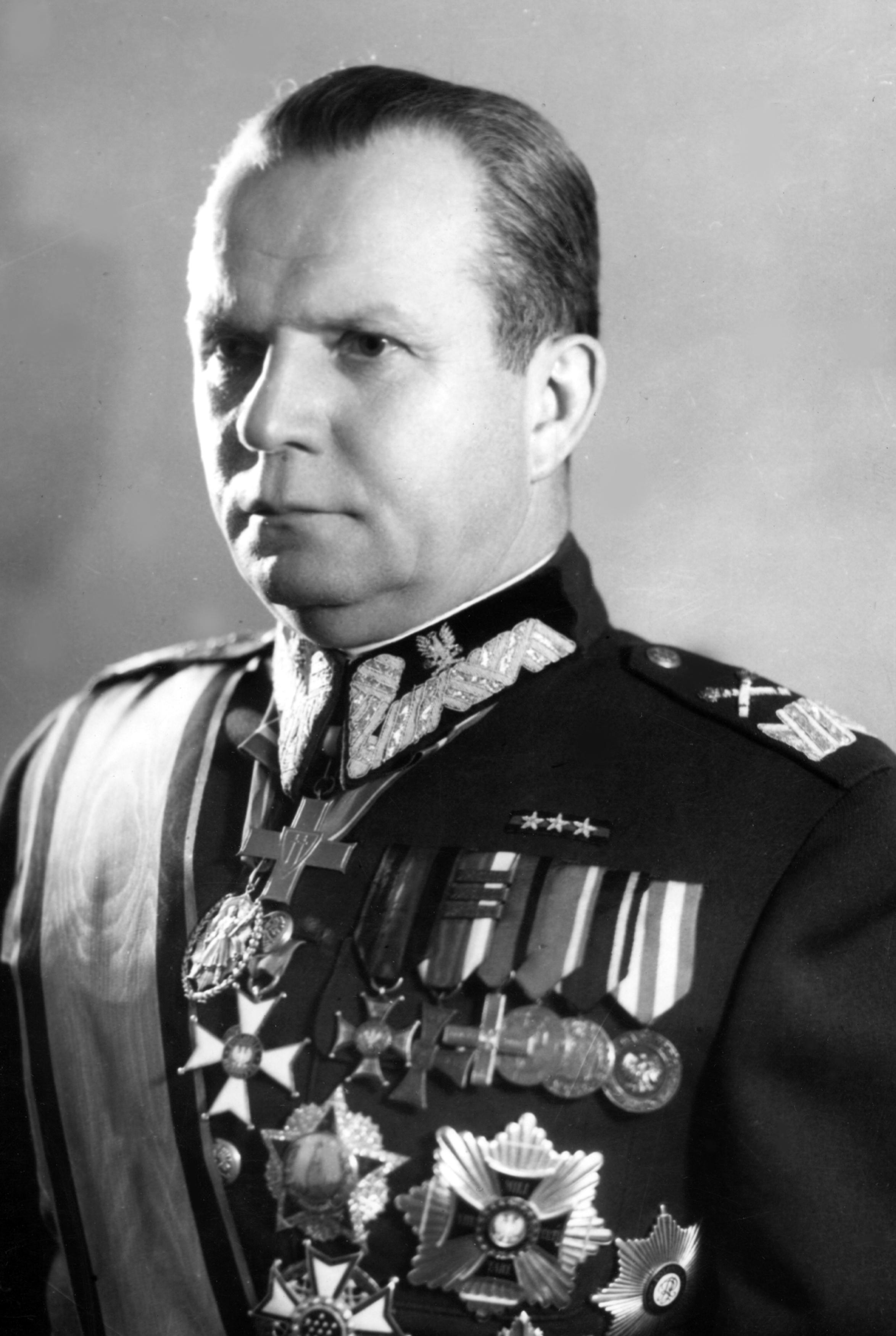
Michał Rola-Żymierski

== Polish Legions' Emblems ==
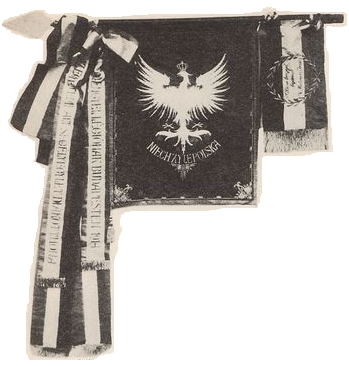
1914 Polish Legions' banner donated by the Hungarians

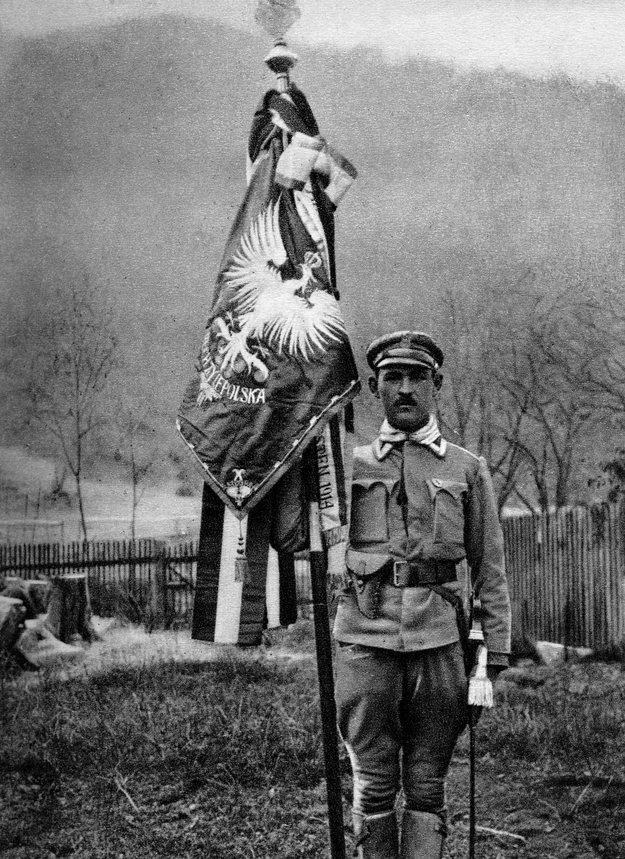
1914 Standard-bearer Marek with a banner donated by the Hungarians.

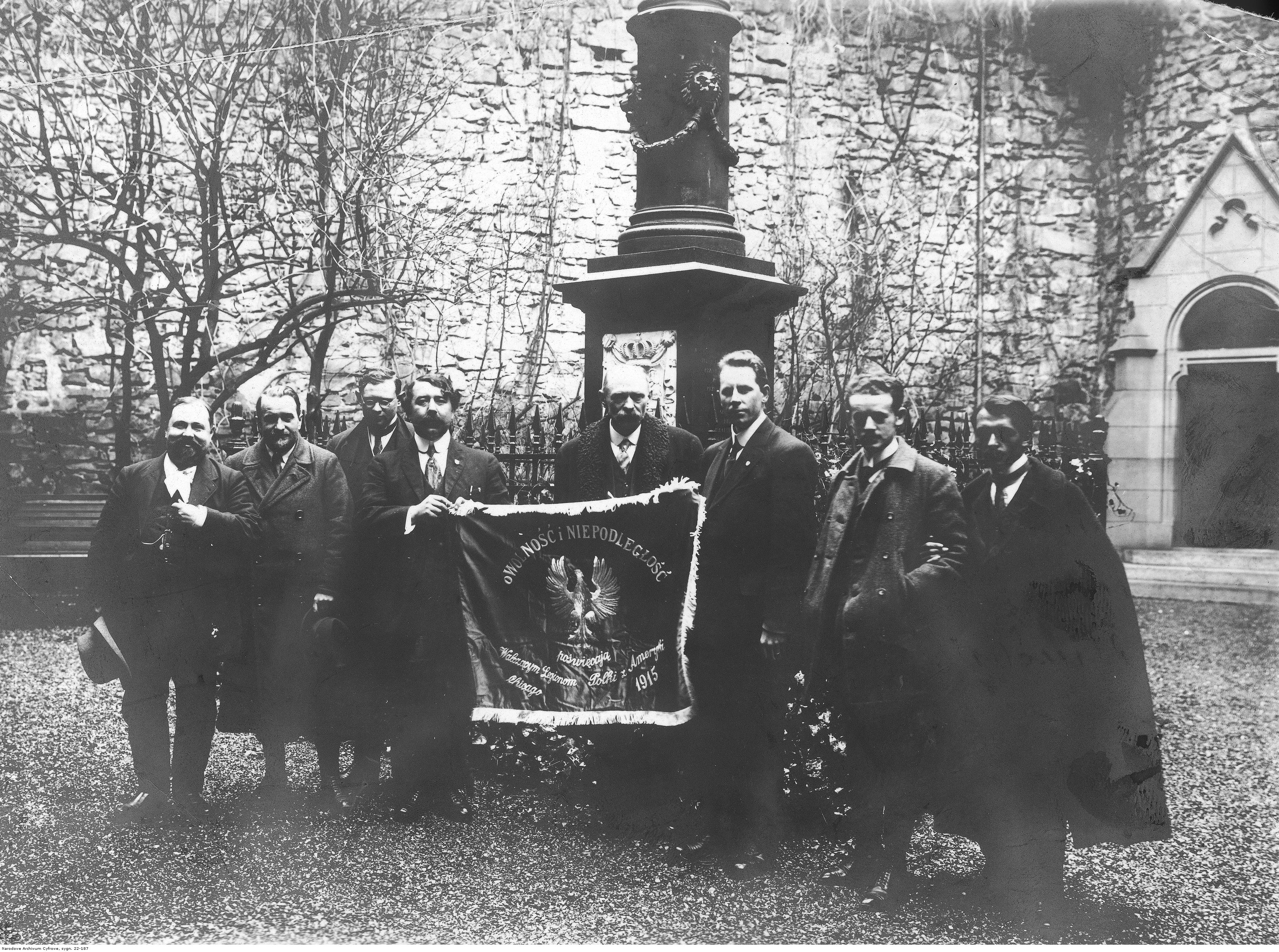
1915 Polish Legion banner embroidered by Polish women from Chicago, funded by the National Defense Committee in America and brought by Aleksander Dębski.

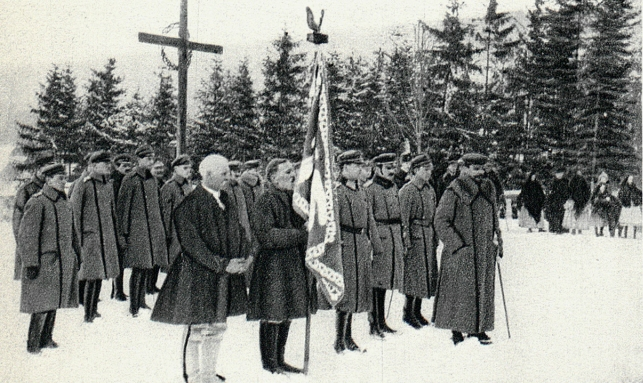
1917 banner officers by the highlander delegation of the 3rd Infantry Regiment of the Polish Legions.

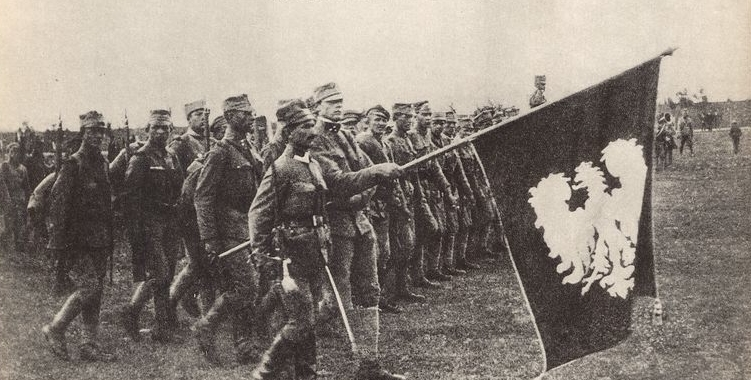
4th Infantry Regiment Polish Legion

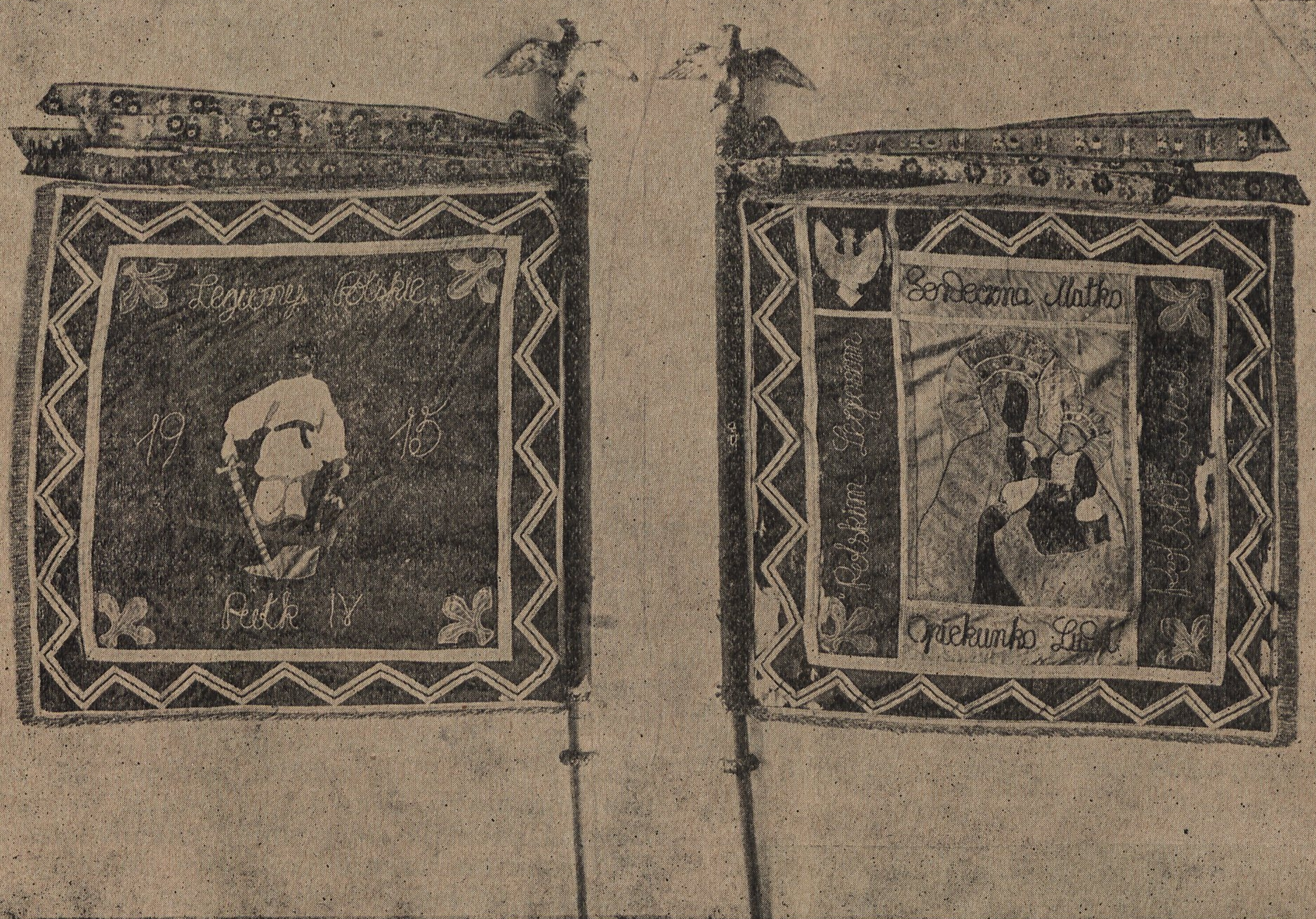
Banner of the 4th Infantry Regiment (Polish Legions)

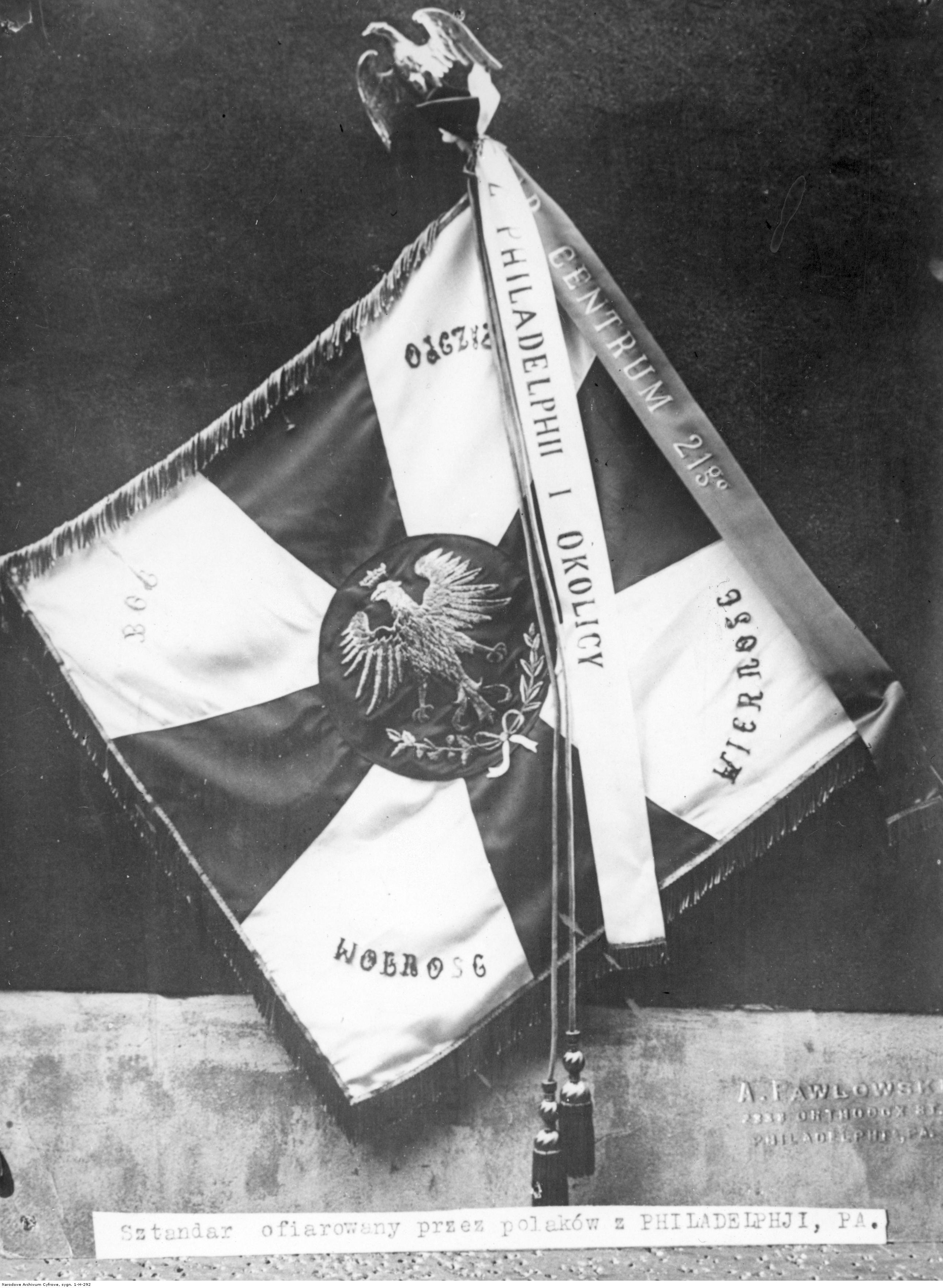
1918 Banner donated to the Polish Army in France by the citizens of Philadelphia.

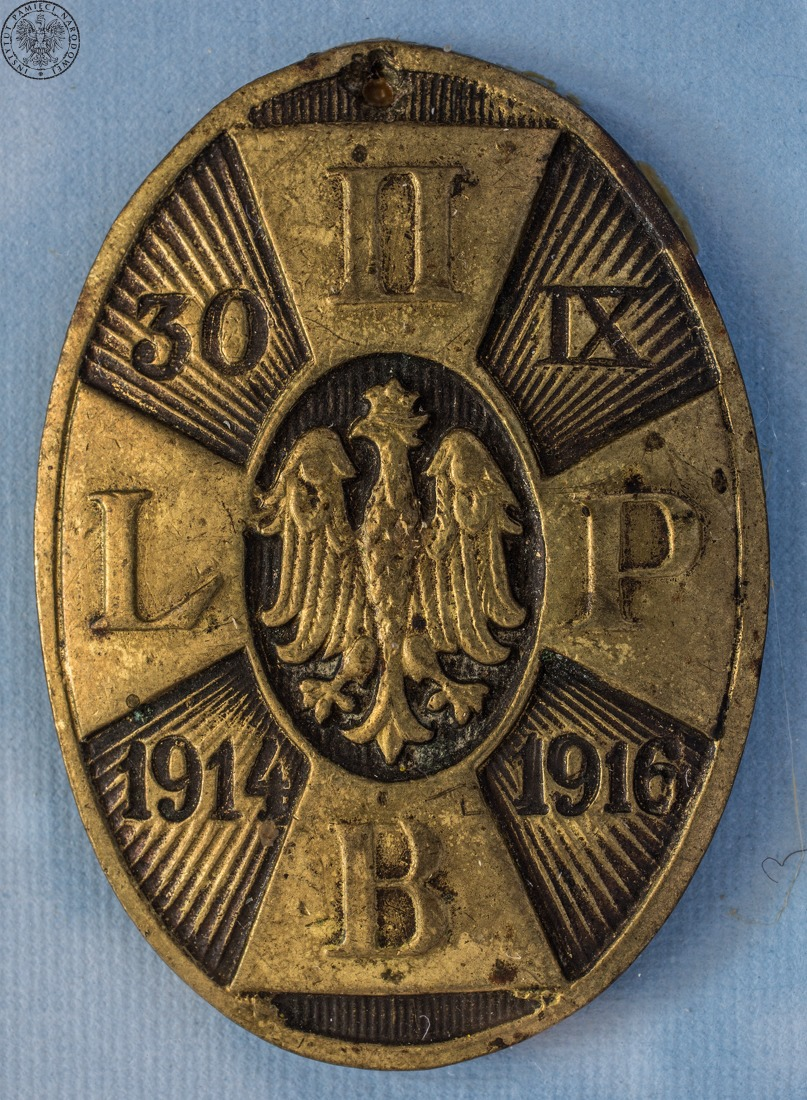
Badge of the 2nd Brigade of the Polish Legions.

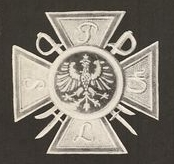
Badge of the Polish Legions cadet school.

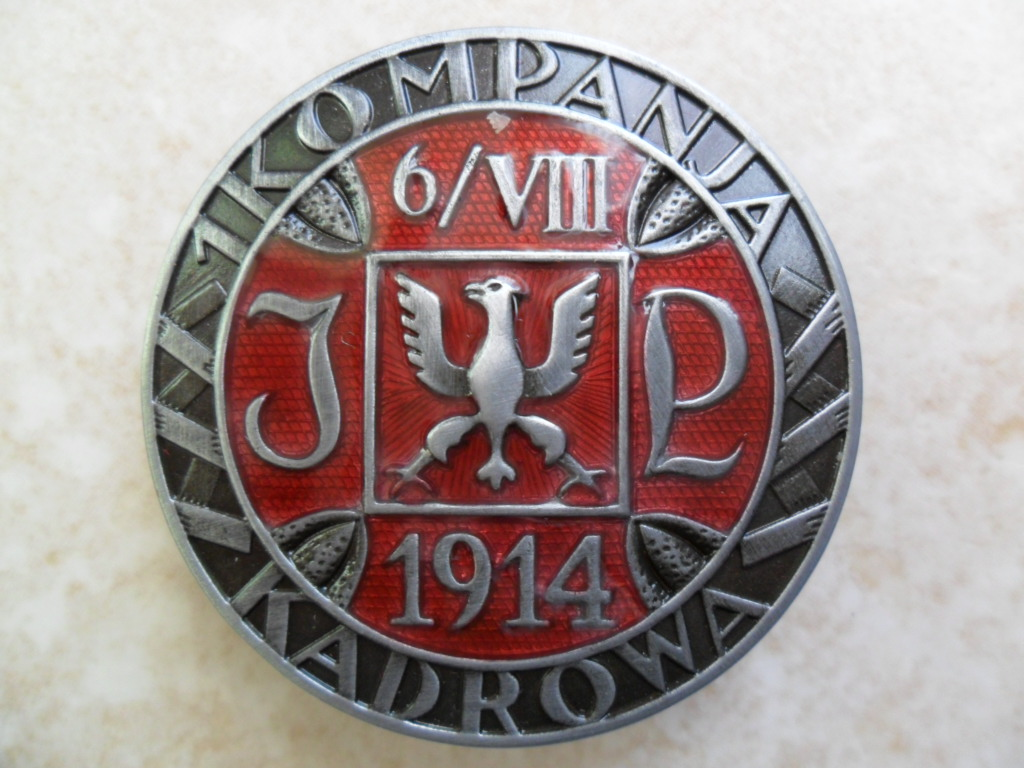
Badge of the 1st Cadre Company

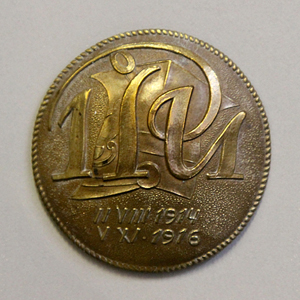
1st Infantry Regiment of the Polish Legion

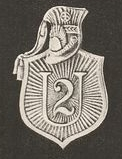
2nd Uhlan Regiment of the Polish Legions

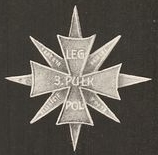
3rd Infantry Regiment of the Polish Legion

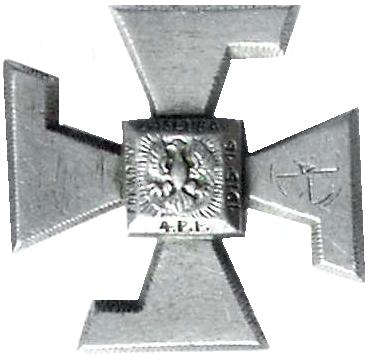
4th Infantry Regiment of the Polish Legion

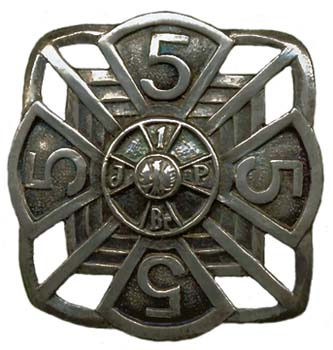
5th Infantry Regiment of the Polish Legion

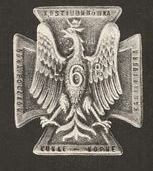
6th Infantry Regiment of the Polish Legion

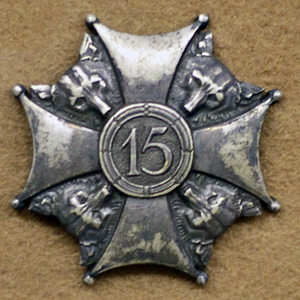
15th Infantry Regiment of the Polish Legion

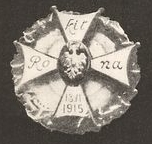
Badge of participation in the charge of Rokitna

== See also ==
- Polish Legions (disambiguation)
- Stanisław Skarżyński
- Czesław Zbierański
- Association of the Polish Youth "Zet"
- Blue Army (Poland)
- First Cadre Company
- Greater Poland Uprising (1918–1919)
- Kingdom of Poland (1916–1918)
- List of Polish divisions in World War I
- My Pierwsza Brygada
- Polish Army Veterans' Association in America
- Polish Legion of American Veterans
- Polish Auxiliary Corps
- Polish I Corps in Russia
- Polish II Corps in Russia
- Polish 1st Legions Infantry Division
- Polish Military Organisation
- Polish Rifle Squads
- Polska Siła Zbrojna
- Riflemen's Association
- Union of Active Struggle
- The Seven Lancers of Belina
