= 3rd Legions' Infantry Regiment =

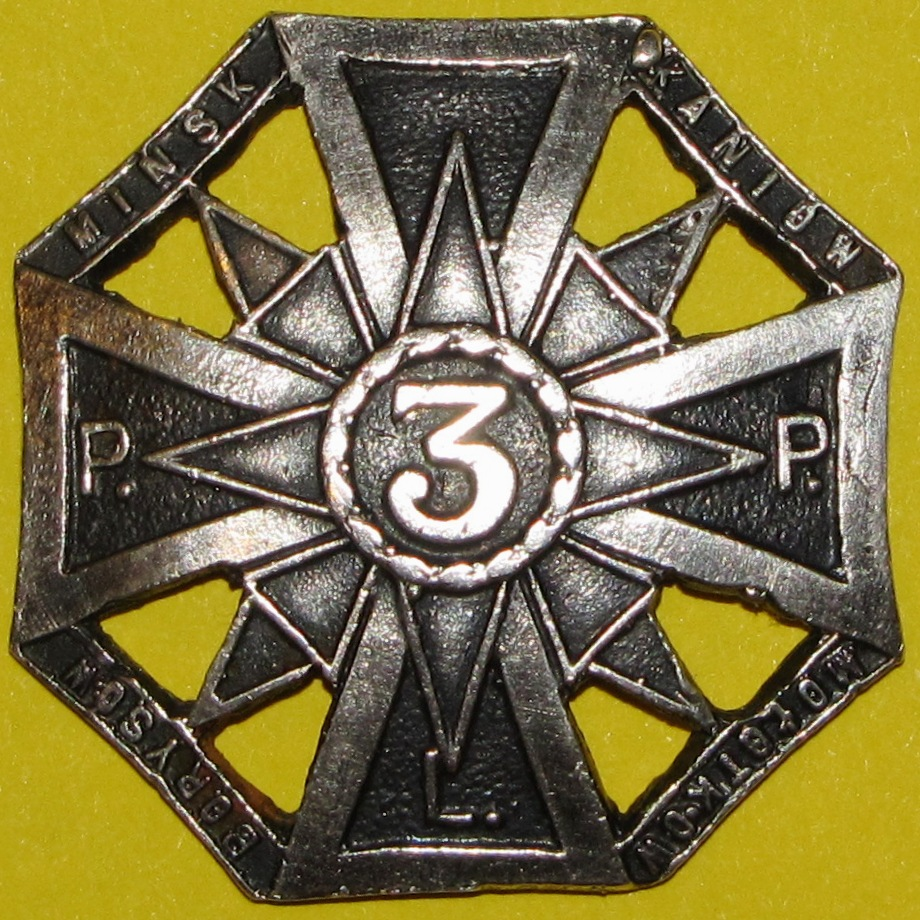
- Active: Autumn 1914 – 1939; 1944 – 1945
- Country: Austria-Hungary (1914-1918); Poland (1918-1939); Home Army (1944-1945)
- Role: Infantry
- Engagements: World War I: Battle of Galicia; Battle of Rafajlowa; Battle of Mołotków; Battle of Kostiuchnówka; Battle of Rarańcza; Battle of Kaniów; Polish–Ukrainian War; Polish-Soviet War: Battle of Warsaw (1920); World War II: Invasion of Poland; Operation Tempest

3rd Legions' Infantry Regiment (Polish: 3. Pulk Piechoty Legionów; 3 pp Leg.) was an infantry unit of Polish Legions in World War I, Polish Army and the Home Army. It existed in 1914–1939 and 1944–1945.

The regiment was formed in the autumn of 1914, out of soldiers of Eastern Legion, which was dissolved on September 21, 1914, after most its soldiers had refused to swear allegiance and obedience to the Emperor Franz Joseph I of Austria. Reinforced with additional volunteers from Austrian Silesia and Austrian Galicia, it took part in the Battle of Galicia as early as October 1914. The regiment fought in several important battles, such as the Battle of Rafajlowa, Battle of Mołotków, Battle of Kostiuchnówka, Battle of Rarańcza and the Battle of Kaniów. Disarmed by the Germans after the Battle of Kaniów (May 1918) the regiment was recreated by Polish authorities in early 1919. It fought in Polish–Ukrainian War (1918–19) and Polish–Soviet War of 1920.

In the Second Polish Republic Third Legions Infantry Regiment was at first stationed in the garrisons of Łuków and Grodno. Transferred to Jarosław, it became part of 2nd Legions Infantry Division from Kielce.

During the Invasion of Poland, the regiment was part of Łódź Army. It fought the advancing Wehrmacht in central Poland, from the area of Skierniewice through the Kampinos Forest to Modlin Fortress, surrendering on September 29, 1939.

The regiment was created once again in mid-1944 by the Home Army of the District of Radom–Kielce. During Operation Tempest it was part of Second Home Army Legions Division, and was dissolved in January 1945.

== World War I ==
Forming of the 3rd Legions Infantry Regiment began in Kraków in late August 1914. The unit was based on volunteers, soldiers of the former Eastern Legion and soldiers of a reserve battalion of 1st Legions Infantry Regiment, stationed in Chocznia. Some of its officers were members of the paramilitary patriotic organization, Riflemen's Association.

Due to rapid Russian advance into Austrian Galicia, the still incomplete regiment, commanded by General Karol Durski-Trzaska was sent in early September 1914 to the town of Khust in Hungary. There its battalions were placed in different locations. In mid-October, the regiment, together with Second Legions Infantry Regiment, cavalry and artillery was concentrated near Königsfeld. On October 22–23, 1914, the unit fought in the Battle of Rafajlowa, managing to halt Russian advance. On October 29, Polish Legions of some 8000 soldiers faced the Russians in the Battle of Mołotków, and in late January 1915, the Poles fought in the Battle of Rafajlowa.

In March 1915, battalions of the regiment fought in different location in Bukovina and southeastern corner of Galicia. In early April the regiment was transferred to Kołomyja, where on April 15 it was included into 2nd Brigade, Polish Legions. Major Henryk Minkiewicz was named commandant of the unit, 1st Battalion was headed by Captain Bolesław Zaleski, 2nd Battalion by Colonel Józef Szczepan, and 3rd Battalion by Colonel Józef Zając.

In spring 1915, German and Austro-Hungarian armies initiated a very successful Gorlice–Tarnów Offensive. The regiment was transported to Bessarabia, where in May 1915 it fought along the Prut river, and on June 4 tried to break through Russian lines, but was repelled. Three days later, the regiment managed to advance forward, taking positions along the Rokitnianka river (see also Charge of Rokitna). In June 1915, the regiment, together with whole 2nd Brigade regrouped in the Bessarabian-Bukovinian border areas, and on June 16 took positions near Rarańcza (Redkovtsy), where frontline stabilized for four months.

In autumn 1915 the regiment was transferred to Volhynia. After several bloody skirmishes in the autumn of 1915, the situation stabilized until June 1916, when the Russians initiated the Brusilov Offensive. The regiment fought in the Battle of Kostiuchnówka and other clashes, and in October 1916 was transferred to recuperate in Baranowicze.

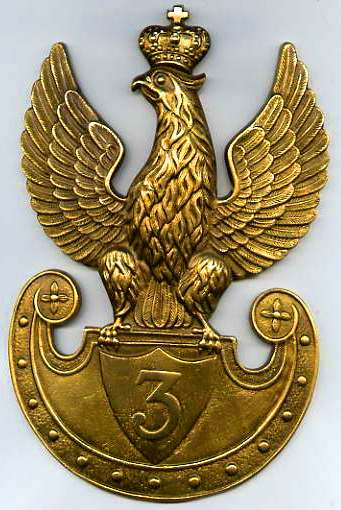
Eagle of the Regiment

In late November 1916, the regiment was transferred to Warsaw, and in January 1917 it was moved to Zegrze for training by German rules. The training lasted until August 1917. Following the Oath crisis, when some soldiers refused to swear allegiance and obedience to the Emperor Wilhelm II of Germany, the rebels were interned in camps at Beniaminów and Szczypiorno.

On August 24, 1917, the regiment was transported to Przemyśl, and in October was sent to the frontline along the Prut. In February 1918 the regiment was stationed in the area of Czerniowce. After the Treaty of Brest-Litovsk (Ukraine–Central Powers), most soldiers decided to break through Austrian lines and join Polish II Corps in Russia (see Battle of Rarańcza). They managed to reach the town of Soroca, where both forces merged, creating the Second Polish Corps.

Due to a rapid German offensive, the Corps retreated towards the Dniepr river. Near the town of Kaniv, German and Austrian forces surrounded the Poles, who were commanded by General Józef Haller. After the Battle of Kaniów (May 10–11, 1918), the Corps capitulated on May 12, and Polish soldiers were disarmed and taken into captivity. Those who had served in the Legions were regarded as traitors and most of them were imprisoned in Parchim, Mecklenburg, they were kept there until November 1918.

== 1919–1921 ==
After Poland had regained independence (November 1918), Polish military authorities decided to recreate the regiment. In March 1919, the Third Legions Infantry Regiment was formed in Zegrze near Warsaw, and on April 12, its 1st Battalion was sent to northeastern front, where it was engaged in fighting the Red Army near Lida. On May 18, the 2nd Battalion arrived at Lida, while 3rd Battalion was on June 21, 1919, sent to Galicia, where it fought in the Polish–Ukrainian War near Tarnopol.

In mid-July 1919 the Third Battalion was sent to the area of Mołodeczno, and in August, after heavy fighting, it captured Minsk. Three battalions of the regiment were then united and advanced to Borysów, reaching the line of the Berezina River (August 18). The frontline in Belarus stabilized until early summer 1920, when great Soviet offensive began. The regiment retreated towards Siedlce, via Minsk, Wołkowysk, Białowieża and Mielnik

During the Battle of Warsaw (1920), the regiment, which was part of 3rd Legions Infantry Division, belonged to the Second Polish Army. Its task was to defend the Vistula river line from Karczew to Dęblin, and the regiment was stationed in Piotrowice. After the Battle of Dęblin and Mińsk Mazowiecki, the enemy retreated in panic, and the regiment was transferred to Krasnystaw, where it fought Soviet 1st Cavalry Army of Semyon Budyonny. On September 23, the regiment was once again sent northwest, to fight in the Battle of the Niemen River. After Żeligowski's Mutiny and the capture of Vilnius by Polish forces, the regiment guarded Polish–Lithuanian border near Druskininkai, until April 1921.

== Second Polish Republic ==
After the period of wars, the regiment was stationed at first in Grodno, to be moved to Suwałki and later to Łuków. Finally, it 1922 it was garrisoned in Jarosław, becoming part of 2nd Legions Infantry Division, whose headquarters was in Kielce. The regiment, divided into three infantry battalions and additional units, had almost 1500 soldiers, with 88 horses. It trained recruits for the Border Protection Corps, and had a platoon of cyclists. In the spring of 1939, the regiment received unknown number of Wz. 35 anti-tank rifles.

== 1939 Invasion of Poland ==
The regiment was mobilized on August 27–29, 1939, and transported by rail to the area of Pabianice. On September 2, it marched to the area of Łask, and remained there as a reserve unit of Łódź Army. On September 5, it was engaged in heavy fighting against the advancing Wehrmacht. On the next day, German 17th Infantry Division approached Łask, and as a result, Polish forces regrouped and retreated towards Głowno. On September 8 in the evening, Colonel Edward Dojan-Surowka, who commanded the infantry of the 2nd Legions Division, had a nervous breakdown and abandoned his soldiers. The regiment retreated to Skierniewice, and then marched towards Warsaw.

In the morning of September 12, it was involved in a bloody skirmish near Błonie, after which General Wiktor Thommée decided to withdraw elements of the division to Modlin. Of three battalions of the regiment, only Second Battalion remained as a cohesive fighting force. In the afternoon of September 13, the regiment crossed the Kampinos Forest, reaching Kazuń Nowy on September 14 in the morning. On September 16, remnants of the regiment took defensive positions in Modlin Fortress, and fought there until the capitulation of September 29.

== Operation Tempest 1944 ==
In the spring of 1944, the Home Army recreated the regiment for the Operation Tempest. It was officially called 3rd Legions Home Army Infantry Regiment, and belonged to 2nd Legions Home Army Infantry Division "Pogon". The regiment fought the Germans until autumn 1944, and was dissolved in January 1945.

== Traditions ==
Left side of the flag

Right side of the flag

First flag of the regiment was funded in 1915 in Czerniowce, by Hungarian volunteers, who served in this unit. Second flag was founded in January 1917 by the residents of the region of Podhale. Both flags were lost to the German-Austrian forces on February 15, 1918, during the Battle of Rarańcza.

On September 27, 1923, the President of Poland confirmed the new regimental flag, which was funded by the residents of Ostrowiec Świętokrzyski and Opatów. The flag was lost during the Invasion of Poland. Buried together with regimental documents somewhere in Modlin, it has never been found.

The regiment celebrated its holiday on September 30, the anniversary of the march to the front in 1914. Among its notable soldiers were such figures, as Władysław Sikorski, Józef Haller, Jan Berek and Henryk Minkiewicz.

== Commandants of the Regiment ==
- Colonel Zygmunt Zielinski (September 1914),
- Colonel Józef Haller (September 1914 – January 1915),
- Major Henryk Minkiewicz (February 1915 – July 5, 1916),
- Captain Jozef Szczepan (July 5, 1916 -September 1916),
- Colonel Władysław Sikorski (until November 1916),
- Major Włodzimierz Zagórski (until November 1917),
- Major Jozef Zajac (until February 1918)
- Major Jozef Szczepan (March 28, 1919 – July 17, 1920),
- Major Kazimierz Brozek (July 18, 1920 – September 8, 1920),
- Colonel Michal Zabdyr (September 20, 1920 – October 2, 1929),
- Colonel Leon Grot (XII 1929 – X 1935)
- Colonel Mieczyslaw Lukoski (1935–1939)
- Colonel Jan Zygmunt Emil Berek (July – September 1939)
- Captain Stanislaw Poreda (1944).

== Sources ==
- L. Czyżewski: Od Gór Borowskich do Zakroczymia. Warszawa: Wydawnictwo MON, 1982
- L. Głowacki: Obrona Warszawy i Modlina 1939. Warszawa: Wydawnictwo MON, 1985

== See also ==
- 1939 Infantry Regiment (Poland)
