= List of Polish divisions in World War I =

The following is a list of Polish brigade and division-sized military units during World War I and the subsequent Russian Civil War. See also list of military divisions. Official names are given in parentheses.

Key
Formed in Russia
Formed in France

(Gen. Haller's Blue Army)

Green
Blue

1st Polish Rifle Division (Polish: 1 Dywizja Strzelców Polskich; French: 1^{re} Division Polonaise).

Later 13th Infantry Division.

2nd Polish Rifle Division (2 Dywizja Strzelców Polskich; 2^{e} Division Polonaise)

Later 11th Infantry Division.

3rd Polish Rifle Division (3 Dywizja Strzelców Polskich; 3^{e} Division Polonaise)

4th Polish Rifle Division (4 Dywizja Strzelców Polskich).

Later became the 4th Division of Haller's Blue Army. Renamed to the 10th Infantry Division.

5th Polish Rifle Division (5 Dywizja Strzelców Polskich).

Later became the 5th Division of Haller's Blue Army. Renamed to the 30th Infantry Division.

6th Polish Rifle Division (6 Dywizja Strzelców Polskich; 6^{e} Division Polonaise)

Later 12th Infantry Division.

7th Rifle Division (7 Dywizja Strzelców Polskich; 7^{e} Division Polonaise)

Instructional Division (Dywizja Instrukcyjna)

== Formed in Russia during the Russian Civil War ==
Formation name	Date formed	Date formation ceased to exist	Unit's insignia	Locations served	Notable campaigns	Notes	Source(s)
Polish Legion in Finland	24 April 1917	1 March 1918		Finland	n/a		
I Polish Corps in Russia	24 July 1917	21 May 1918		modern-day Belarus	German anti-Bolshevik campaign in spring 1918	On May 21, 1918, the Corps' commander Józef Dowbor-Muśnicki after acknowledging the Regency Council signed an agreement with the Germans, under which the Corps agreed to be disarmed and disbanded.	
II Polish Corps in Russia	21 December 1917	11 May 1918		modern-day Ukraine	Battle of Kaniów	The corps was disbanded afterwards the battle of Kaniów, with most of its soldiers imprisoned by the Germans.	
III Polish Corps in Russia				Ukraine			
4th Polish Rifle Division	24 August 1918	19 July 1919		southern Russia			
5th Polish Rifle Division	25 January 1919	20 January 1920		Siberia			
Polish Light Brigade (Brygada Lekka)							

== Formed by Austria-Hungary ==
Formation name	Date formed	Date formation ceased to exist	Divisional insignia	Locations served	Notable battles	Source(s)
1st Brigade, Polish Legions	19 December 1914	July 1917		Eastern Front	Łowczówek, Konary, Jastków, Kostiuchnówka	
2nd Brigade, Polish Legions	8 May 1915	15 March 1918 (became the 5th Polish Rifle Division, part of the II Polish Corps in Russia)		Eastern Front	Battle of Britain, The Blitz	
3rd Brigade, Polish Legions	8 May 1915	July 1917		Eastern Front	Battle of Britain, The Blitz	
Polish Auxiliary Corps	20 September 1916	19 February 1918 (formed the basis of the Polnische Wehrmacht)		Eastern Front	Rarańcza, Kaniów (both against the Central Powers)	

== Formed by German Empire ==
Formation name	Date formed	Date formation ceased to exist	Locations served	Notable campaigns	Notes	Source(s)
Polish Armed Forces (1917–1918)	10 April 1917	11 November 1918	N/A	N/A	The Oath crisis happened in July 1917, as a result of which it only remained as a rump unit. After the declaration of Polish independence of 11 November 1918, the units of the Polnische Wehrmacht became the basis of the Polish Army.	
