= Polish Armed Forces in the East (1914–1920) =

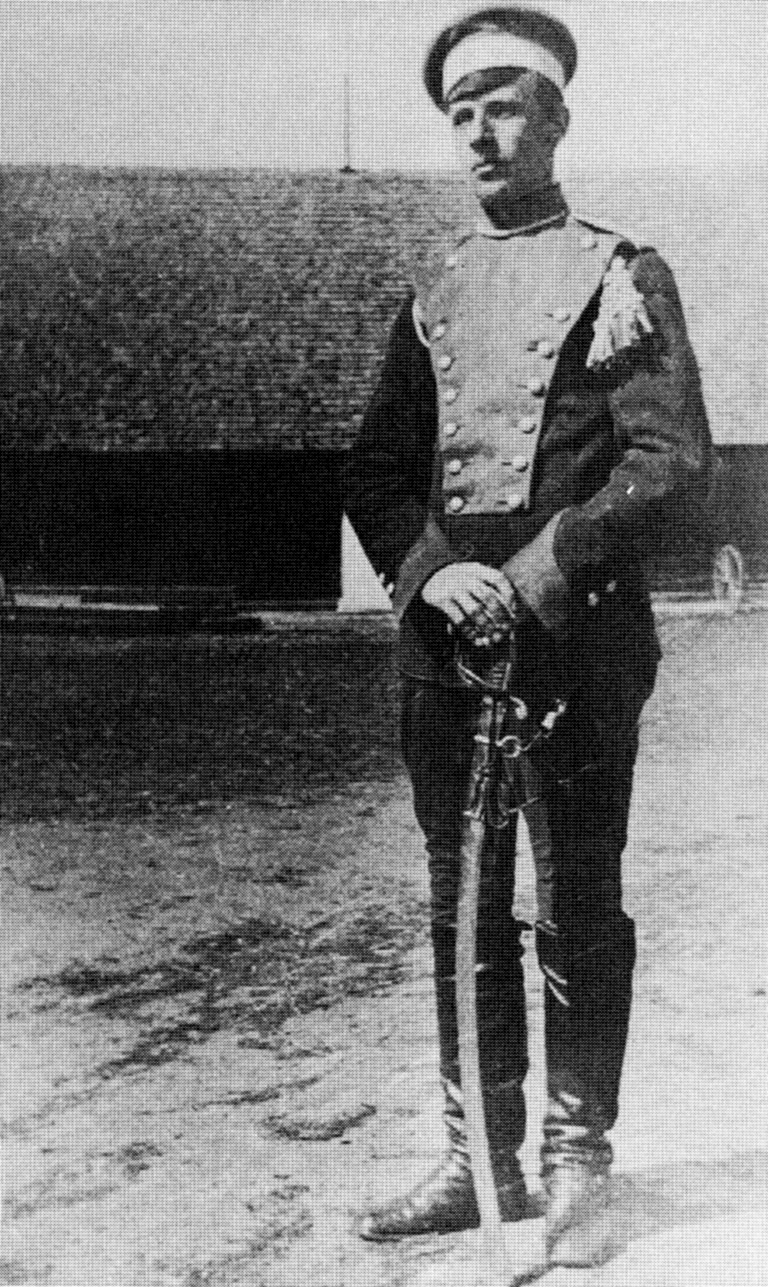
- An uhlan of the Puławy Legion
- Active: 1914–1920
- Disbanded: 1920
- Country: Poland
- Allegiance: Russian Empire
- Branch: Imperial Russian Army
- Type: Military formations
- Engagements: World War I Russian Revolution of 1917; Polish-Ukrainian War

Polish Armed Forces in the East (Polish: Polskie Siły Zbrojne na Wschodzie, Russian: Вооруженные силы Польши на Востоке) around World War I is a term used for several Polish military formations formed in Russia and operating in the period of 1914–1920 (First World War, Russian Revolution of 1917, and the early stages of the Polish-Ukrainian War and Polish-Soviet War). Early formations were part of the Imperial Russian Army. Later, during the Russian Revolution, the Polish formations were mainly allied to the White Russian forces and the Western powers (both the German Empire and the Entente). All the formations (or their remains) were eventually incorporated into the Polish Army by 1920.

== Puławy Legion ==
Puławy Legion was a Polish military formation of World War I, as part of the Imperial Russian Army. It was created in late 1914 from volunteers gathered together due to several initiatives, most notably of which was that of the pro-Russian Polish National Committee The initiative was supposed to counteract the Polish Legions of Józef Piłsudski forming under the Austro–Hungarian Army. The formation finished organizing in January 1915; at that time it numbered about 1,000 soldiers, and constituted a battalion of the Russian Army. A second unit, the Lublin Legion, was created as well. Later, in a reorganization, the Legions were renamed: the Puławy Legion into the 739 New Aleksandrovo Squad and the 740 Lublin Squad. The formation was used in combat against the German Empire. The Legion fought on the frontlines from March till September 1915, when it was withdrawn to rest and reinforce. Eventually, the Legion was disbanded in October 1915 and reorganized into the Polish Rifle Brigade.

== Polish Rifle Brigade and Division ==
The Polish Rifle Brigade was formed as part of the Imperial Russian Army in October 1915 on the basis of the previous Legion formation. The Brigade was commanded by general Piotr Szymanowski, later by general Adam Sławoczyński and then general Bolesław Olszewski. The Brigade was deployed to the frontlines in March 1916, at about 8,000 strength. In January 1917 it was reorganized into the Polish Rifle Division. The Division commander was general Tadeusz Bylewski, succeeded by colonels Żeligowski and Rządkowski, and then general Symon. In mid June the division was deployed to the frontlines in East Galicia. The Division's formation was partially disrupted by the Russian Revolution of 1917. Eventually it was incorporated into the Polish I Corps as its 1st Rifle Division.

== The Polish Corps in Russia ==
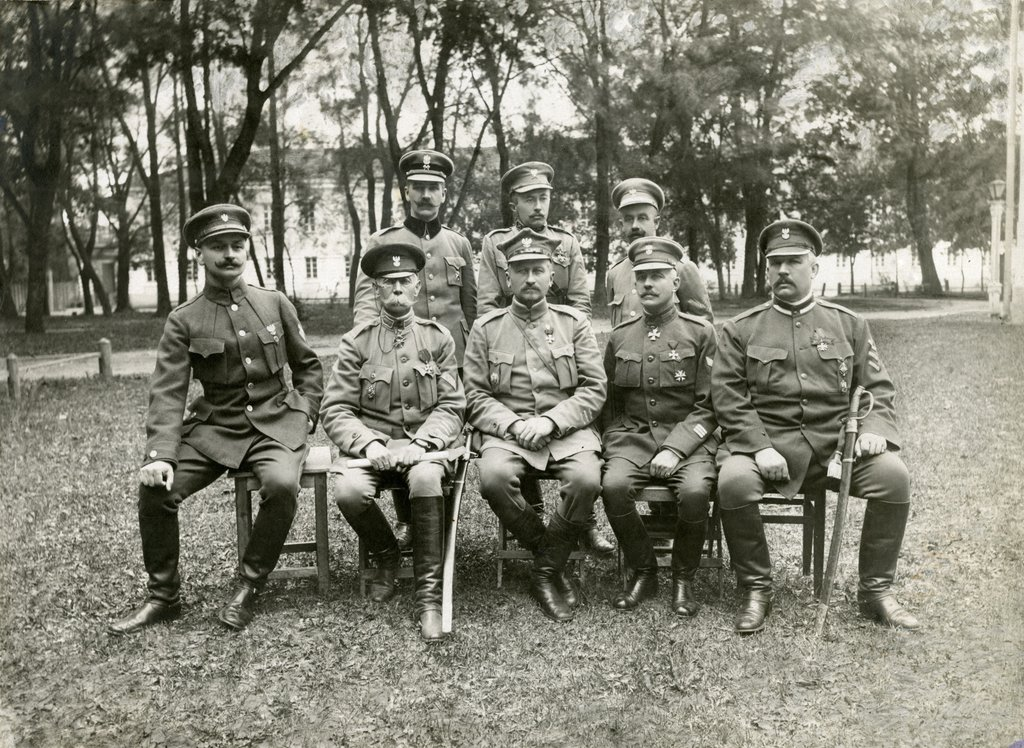
Gen. Józef Dowbor-Muśnicki and officers of the headquarters of the Polish I Corps in Russia in 1918

The Polish Corps were formations organized around the time of the Russian Revolution, grouping together Polish units and focusing on protecting Polish people.

Polish I Corps in Russia was a Polish military formation formed in Belarus, in August 1917 in the aftermath of the Russian Revolution of 1917, from soldiers of Polish origin serving in the Russian Army. Its goal was to defend Poles inhabiting parts of Poland under Russian partitions and support the formation of independent Poland. The Corps was formed at the initiative of the Chief Polish Military Committee, a Polish faction in the revolutionary and split Russian Empire military. It was commanded by general Józef Dowbor-Muśnicki, and numbered about 29,000 soldiers. In the chaotic period at the end of the First World War on the Eastern Front, the Polish I Corps fought against the Bolshevik Red Army, cooperated with the German Ober Ost forces in taking Minsk, and after acknowledging the Regency Council in May 1918, it surrendered to the German forces in Babruysk. The soldiers were given safe passage to Warsaw, where they became part of the newly created Polish Army.

In addition to the I Corps, there were also the Polish II Corps in Russia and the Polish III Corps in Russia. The II Corps was formed on 21 December 1917 in Soroca (now in Moldavia), then a Bessarabian region disputed by revolutionary Ukraine and Romania. The Corps avoided major engagements, and concentrated on protecting the Polish inhabitants of the region. In February 1918 the corps merged with the Brigade II of the Polish Legions and by late March Stankiewicz (and/or Glass) was replaced by the brigade commander, General Józef Haller. The II Corps numbered at that point over 8,000. After the Treaty of Brest-Litovsk was signed between Russia and the Central Powers, the Germans demanded that the Polish forces surrender. The Poles refused to lay down their arms and was defeated by the Germans at the battle of Kaniów (10–11 May). Some soldiers who also avoided capture (mostly from the 4th Rifle Division), moved toward Odessa. The III Corps was formed in early 1918 in Ukraine. It numbered about 3,000 people and was never fully fleshed. It was commanded by General Eugeniusz de Henning-Michaelis, General Aleksander Osiński and Colonel Juliusz Rómmel. It was engaged in heavy fighting with insurrectionist Ukrainian peasants and was eventually disarmed by the Austro-Hungarian units in April 1918.

== Polish Forces in Murmansk, Siberia and Odessa ==
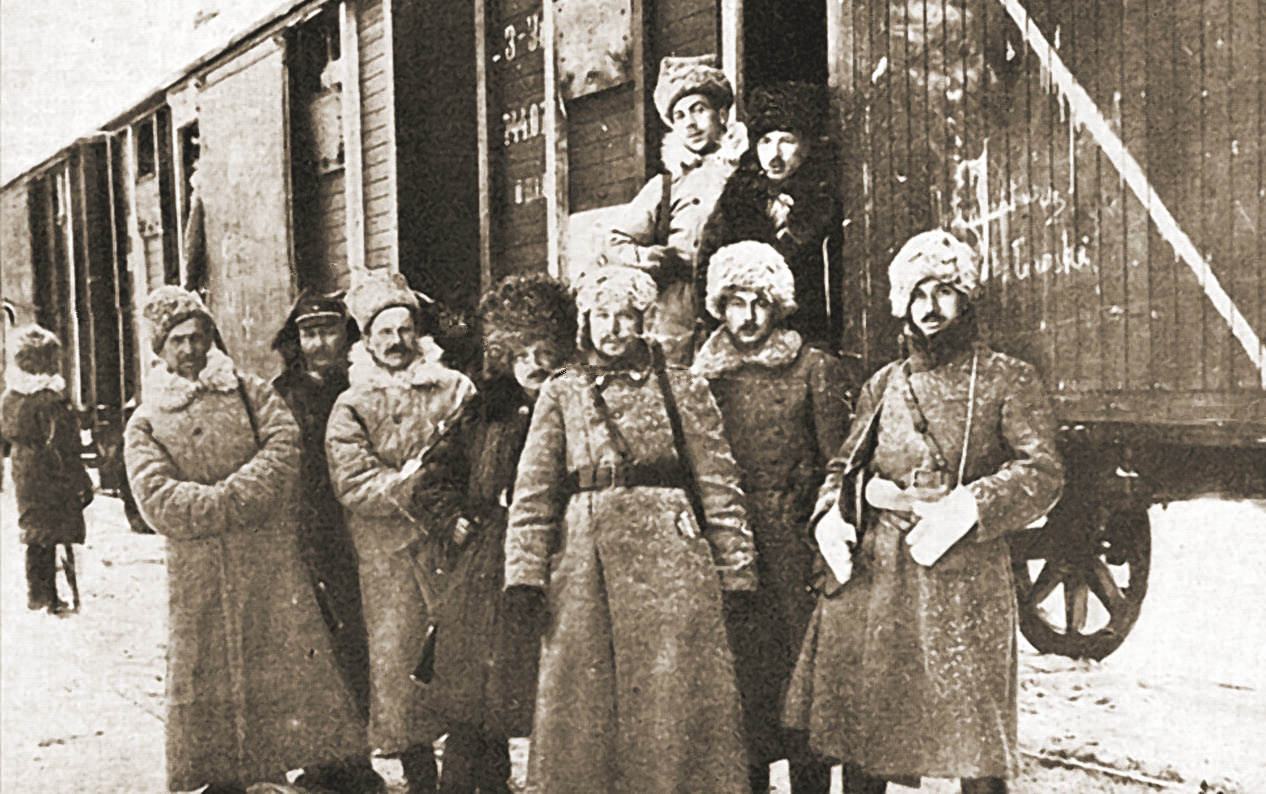
Soldiers of 5th Polish Rifle Division in transport through Siberia, winter 1919/1920

Polish units, namely as the 4th Rifle Division (Poland) and 5th Rifle Division (Poland), also fought in the Murmansk region, in Siberia and in Odessa regions. Those units were the only part of the Polish military which took part in the Russian Civil War. The 4th Division, under the command of General Lucjan Żeligowski, it operated as an ally of the White movement from autumn 1918 to August 1919 in southern Russia (near Odessa) and eventually ending in Bessarabia, before being repatriated to Poland. The 5th Division, also known as the Siberian Division and Siberian Brigade, operated in Siberia, where it was formed in the summer of 1918. That unit was partially forced to capitulate by late 1920, although most soldiers returned to Poland in the aftermath of the Treaty of Riga. In addition to those two divisions, there was also the Murmansk Group which was engaged in the fighting in Archangel as part of general Edmund Ironside's allied force. Several smaller units were briefly formed in other places, such as in Tbilisi.

== See also ==
- Blue Army
- Polish Legions in World War I
