= History of Poland during World War I =

Occupation of Poland during World War I
- Part of World War I
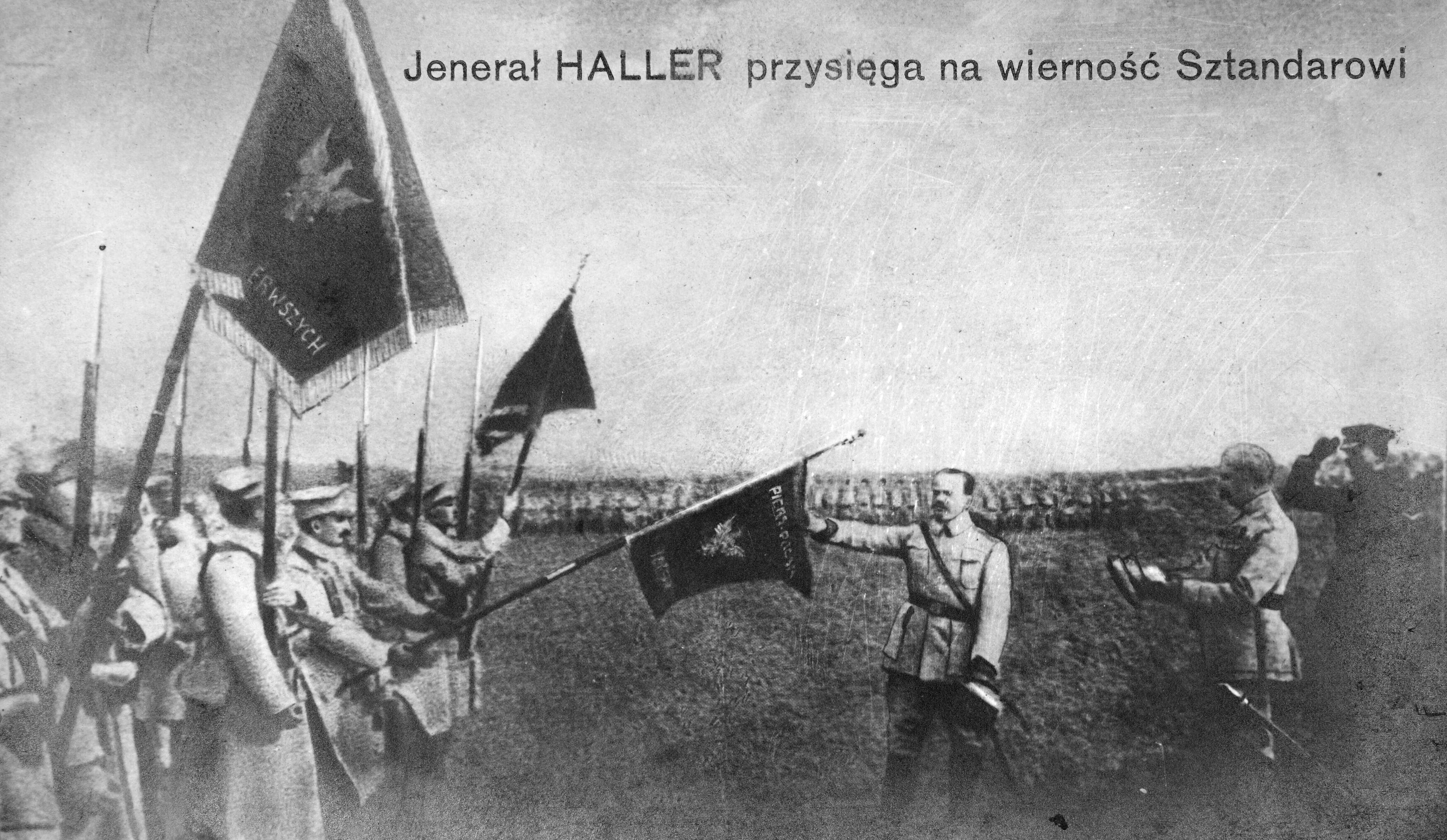
- Duration: 1914–1918
- Motive: The expansionary policy of the occupying powers.
- Participants: Russian Empire, German Empire, Austro-Hungarian Empire
- Outcome: 1,400,000 Poles conscripted into the Austro-Hungarian army 1,200,000 Poles conscripted into the Russian army 700,000 Poles conscripted into the German army Collapse of all three occupying Empires; Establishment of the Second Polish Republic.
- Deaths: 450,000–600,000 military deaths 1,128,000 deaths overall
- Property damage: Destruction of over 1,800,000 buildings and half of the bridges Production output fell to 20% of its level before the war Polish industry suffered the loss of an estimated 73 billion French francs.
- Displaced: 800,000 deported by Russians to the east Hundreds of thousands taken to labor camps in Germany

While Poland did not exist as an independent state during World War I, its geographical position between the fighting powers meant that much fighting and horrific human and material losses occurred on the Polish lands between 1914 and 1918.

At the start of World War I, Polish territory was divided between the Russian, German and Austro-Hungarian empires, and became the scene of many operations of the Eastern Front of World War I.

In the aftermath of the war, following the collapse of the Russian, German and Austro-Hungarian Empires, Poland became an independent republic.

== Split of Three Empires ==
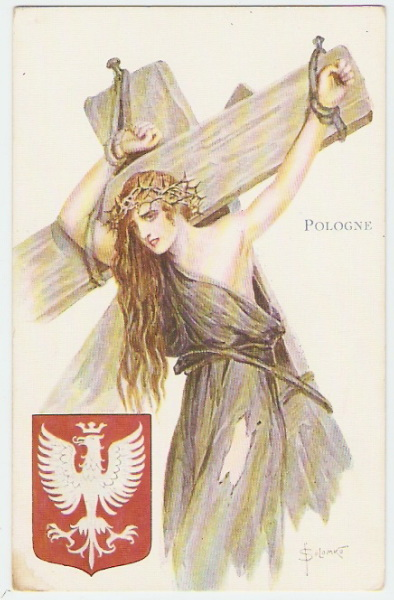
Contemporary French postcard by Sergey Solomko

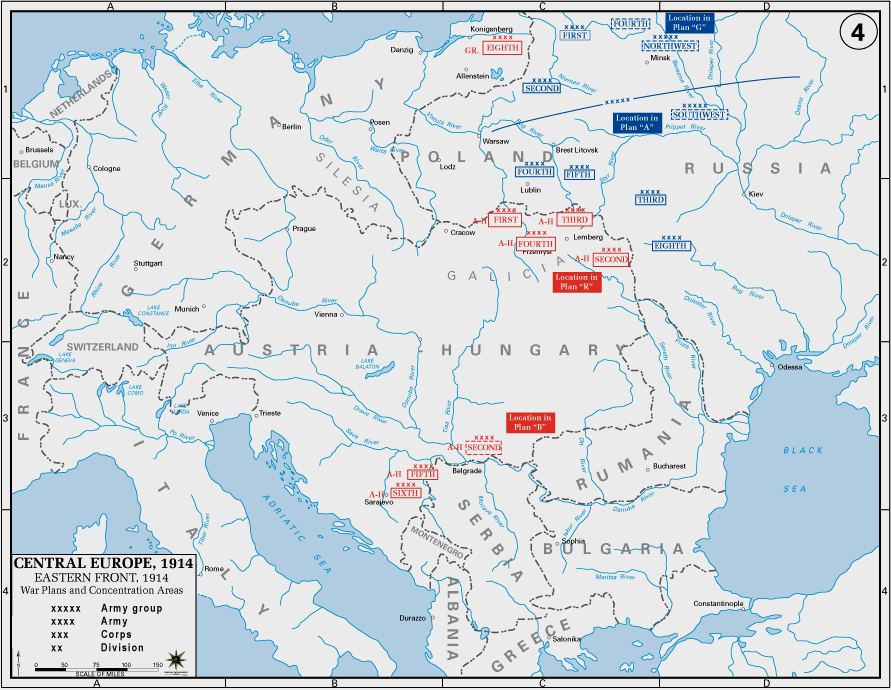
Eastern Front on the verge of conflict in 1914. Polish territories were located roughly in the northern part of the front. Notably, the entire German-Russian frontier, and northern Austrian-Russian frontier passed through those lands.

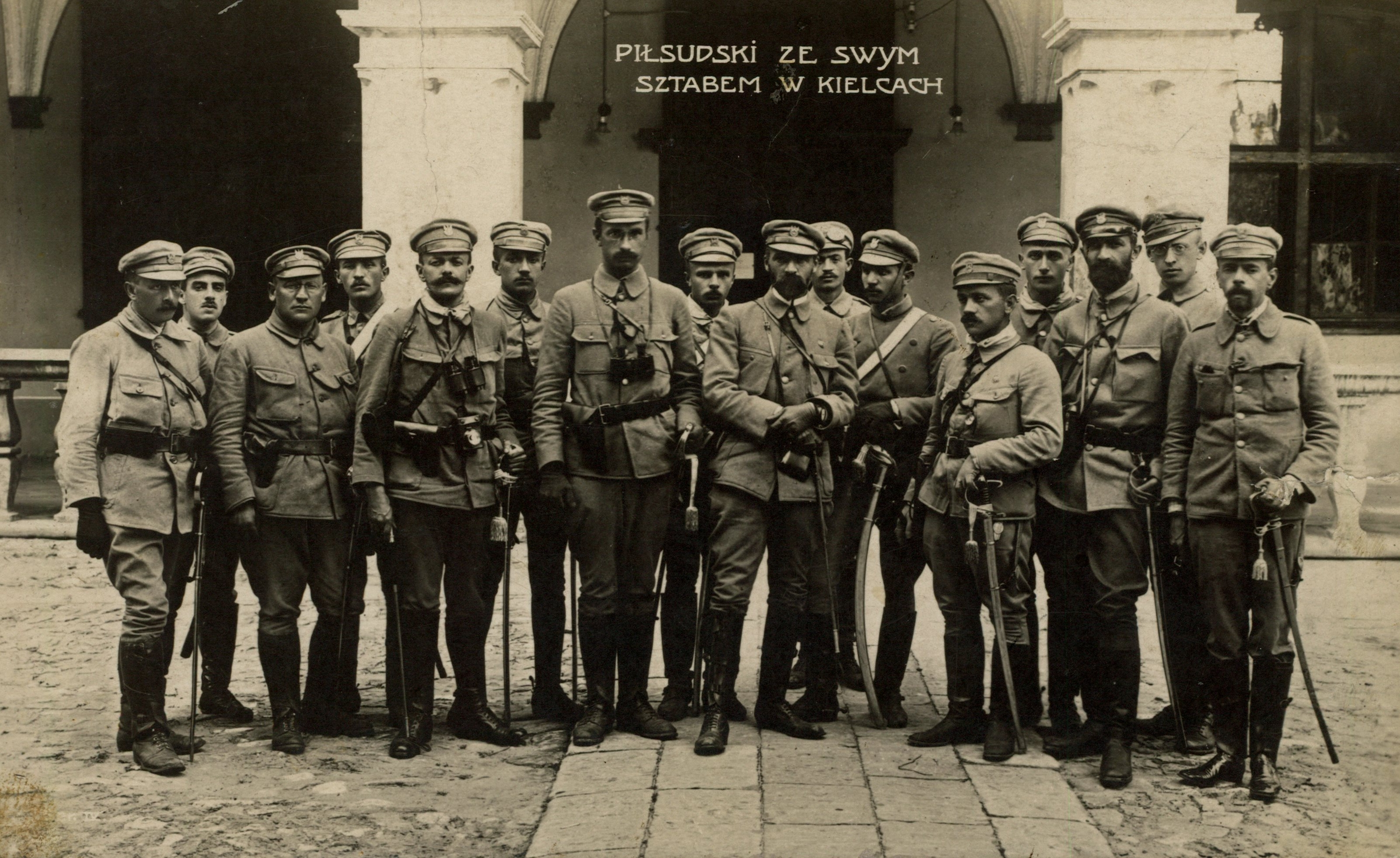
Col. Józef Piłsudski with his staff in front of the Governor's Palace in Kielce, 1914

The war split the ranks of the three partitioning empires, pitting Russia as defender of Serbia and ally of Britain and France against the leading members of the Central Powers, Germany and Austria-Hungary.

== Conflicting aims of empires ==
This circumstance afforded the Poles political leverage as both sides offered pledges of concessions and future autonomy in exchange for Polish loyalty and army recruits.

The Austrians wanted to incorporate the Russian territory of Privislinsky Krai into their territory of Galicia, so even before the war they allowed nationalist organizations to form there (for example, Związek Strzelecki).

In 1914, Russian Grand Duke Nicholas proclaimed an offer of self-government to the Poles in exchange for solidarity against Prussia. Some representatives of the Poles responded positively, saying that the "two Slav peoples" are shedding blood "against the common enemy."

The Russians recognized the Polish right to autonomy and allowed formation of the Polish National Committee, which supported the Russian side. Russia's foreign Minister Sergei Sazonov proposed to create an autonomous Kingdom of Poland with its own internal administration, religious freedom and Polish language used in schools and administration. Poland would receive eastern area of Poznań region, southern Silesia and Western Galicia.

As the war settled into a long stalemate, the issue of Polish self-rule gained greater urgency. Roman Dmowski spent the war years in Western Europe, hoping to persuade the Allies to unify the Polish lands under Russian rule as an initial step toward liberation.

In June 1914, Józef Piłsudski had correctly predicted that the war would ruin all three of the partitioners, a conclusion often considered unlikely before 1918. Piłsudski therefore formed the Polish Legions to assist the Central Powers in defeating Russia as the first step toward full independence for Poland. According to Prit Buttar, "At the Beginning of the war, Piłsudski committed his forces to support the Austro-Hungarian cause, believing that Poland's best chance for independence lay in a victory of the Central Powers over Russia, followed by the defeat of the Central Powers by France and Britain. He had talks in secret with the Western Powers, assuring them that his men would never fight against them, only against the Russians."

The encroaching German forces were met with hostility and distrust. Unlike the Napoleonic forces a century earlier, Poles didn't see them as liberators.

The Russians were bid farewell, often with sadness, grief and uncertainty. There was no harassment of retreating Russian soldiers, nor attacks on wounded. For many Poles, Russians at that time were seen as "ours," due to the process of liberalization that occurred in the Russian Empire after the 1905 Revolution. This was in contrast to Germany which, through its actions of relentless Germanization of Poles within its borders, the Września school strike, persecution of Polish education in Pomerania and Poznań, and in 1914 the Destruction of Kalisz increased pro-Russian and anti-German feelings. This attitude distressed Austrian-orientated Piłsudski. Only in late summer of 1915 after harsh policy of Russian plunder of Polish lands did the sympathy of Poles for Russia wane.

According to Prit Buttar, following the first year of fighting in 1914, "The people who suffered the most were those who had no national army serving their cause: the Poles. Most of Poland west of Warsaw had been turned into a battlefield, and large areas were deliberately devastated by the Germans during their retreat from the Vistula. Treated with disdain by Germans, Russians, and the Austro-Hungarians alike, the Poles could only endure through a cold winter in their shattered towns and villages, and hope for a better future."

== Kingdom of Poland (1916–1918) ==
In 1916, attempting to increase Polish support for the Central Powers and to raise a Polish army, the German and Austrian emperors declared that a new state called the Kingdom of Poland would be created. The new Kingdom in reality was to be a puppet regime under military, economical and political control by the German Reich. Its territory was to be created after the war of only a small part of the old Commonwealth, i.e. the territory of Kingdom of Poland (Privislinsky Krai), with around 30,000 square kilometers of its western areas to be annexed by Germany. Polish and Jewish population in those areas was to be expelled and replaced by German colonists. A Regency Council was established in preparation for this, forming a proto-Government, and issuing currency, called the Polish mark. German efforts to create an army serving the Central Powers however met with failure, as it lacked expected volunteers for the German cause.

After peace in the East was assured by the Treaty of Brest-Litovsk, Germany and Austria-Hungary started a policy of creating a "Mitteleuropa" ("Central Europe") and on November 5, 1917, declared that a puppet state Kingdom of Poland might be created.

== Battlefields ==
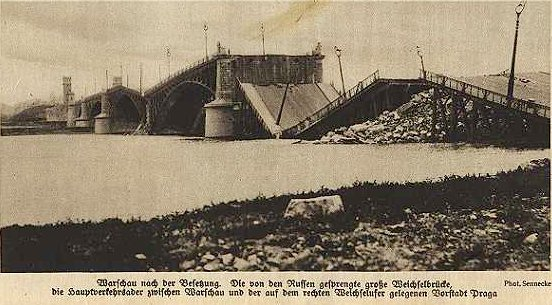
Poniatowski Bridge in Warsaw after being blown up by the retreating Russian Army in 1915.

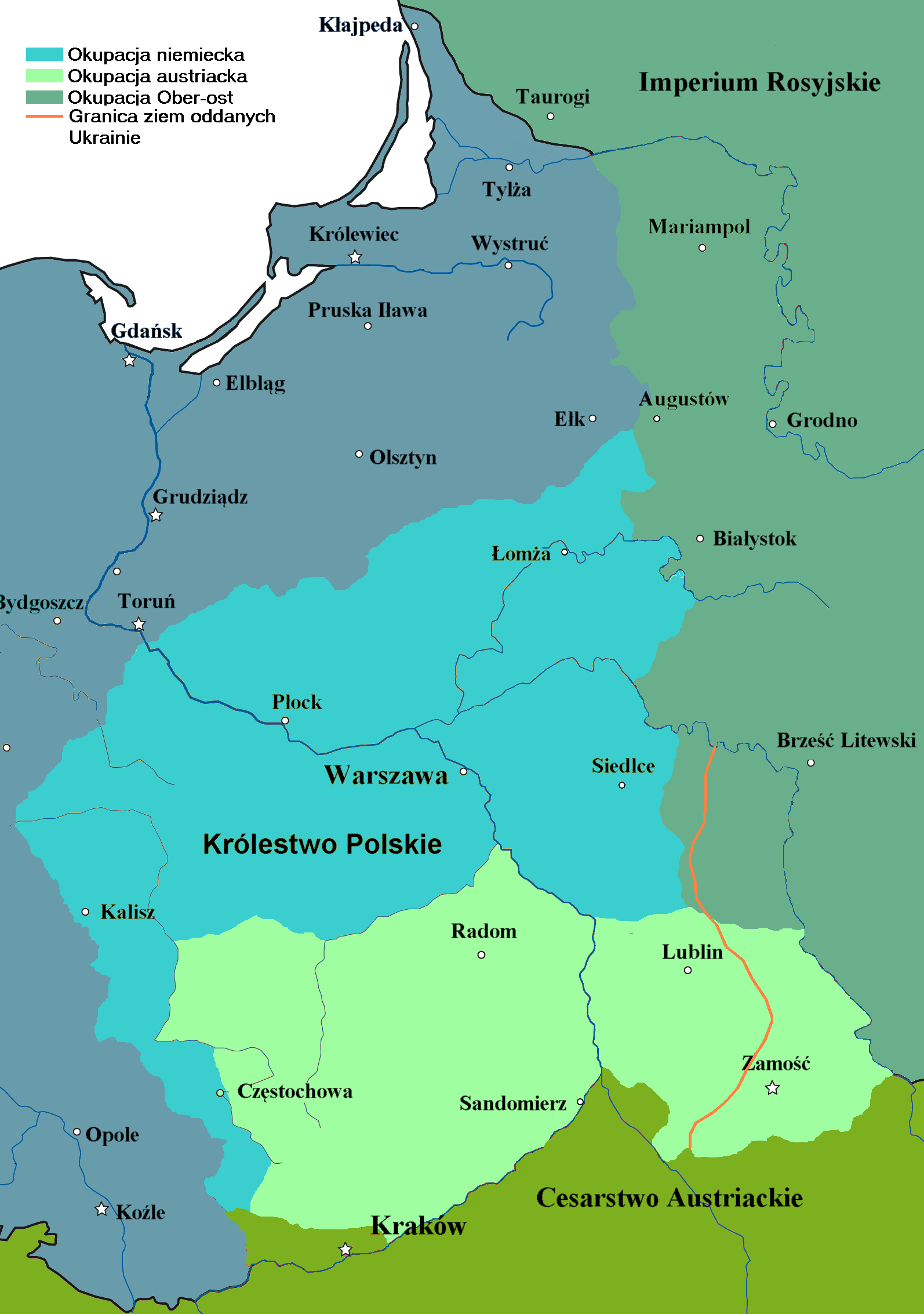
Occupation of the Kingdom of Poland in World War I

Much of the heavy fighting on the war's Eastern Front took place on the territory of the former Polish state. In 1914 Russian forces advanced very close to Kraków before being beaten back. The next spring, heavy fighting occurred around Gorlice and Przemyśl, to the east of Kraków in Galicia. In 1915 Polish territories were looted and abandoned by the retreating Imperial Russian army, trying to emulate the scorched earth policy of 1812; the Russians also evicted and deported hundreds of thousands of its inhabitants suspected of collaborating with the enemy. By the end of 1915, the Germans had occupied the entire Russian sector, including Warsaw. In 1916 another Russian offensive in Galicia exacerbated the already desperate situation of civilians in the war zone; about 1 million Polish refugees fled eastward behind Russian lines during the war. Although the Russian offensive of 1916 caught the Germans and Austrians by surprise, poor communications and logistics prevented the Russians from taking full advantage of their situation.

450,000 Poles died and around one million were wounded while fighting in the Austrian, Russian, and German armies, which by 1916 included close to 2 million Polish soldiers. Several hundred thousand Polish civilians were moved to labor camps in Germany, and 800,000 were deported by the Russians from Congress Poland to the East. The scorched-earth retreat strategies of both sides left much of the war zone uninhabitable. Total deaths from 1914 to 1918, military and civilian, within the 1919–1939 borders, were estimated at 1,128,000. Around 1,800,000 buildings and half of the bridges had been destroyed. Production output fell to 20% of its level before the war and Polish industry suffered the loss of an estimated 73 billion French francs. The British Director of Relief summarized the situation in Poland as following:

"The country...had undergone four or five occupations by different armies, each of which had combed the land for supplies. Most of the villages had been burnt down by the Russians and their retreat (of 1915); land had been uncultivated for four years and had been cleared of cattle, grain, horses and agricultural machinery by both Germans and Bolsheviks. The population here was living upon roots, grass, acorns and heather. The only bread obtainable was composed of those ingredients, with perhaps about 5 per cent of rye flour..."

The lack of food caused widespread malnutrition, which combined with disease often brought by soldiers returning from the front, drove up the mortality rate of the local population. Famine conditions affected a significant area of eastern Poland.

== Military formations ==
Units with a high number of Polish personnel in various armies
Germany	Austria-Hungary	France ("Blue Army")	Russia	
Germany	Austria-Hungary	France ("Blue Army")	Polish I Corps	Polish II Corps
10th Division; 35th Division; 119th Division; 121st Division; 214th Division; 235th Division; 5th Reserve Division; 46th Reserve Division; 47th Reserve Division	I Brigade; II Brigade; III Brigade; 1st Uhlan Regiment; 2nd Uhlan Regiment; 3rd Uhlan Regiment; 4th Uhlan Regiment; 6th Uhlan Regiment; 7th Uhlan Regiment; 8th Uhlan Regiment; 13th Uhlan Regiment	1st Rifle Division; 2nd Rifle Division^{a}; 3rd Rifle Division^{a}; 6th Rifle Division^{a}; 7th Rifle Division^{a}^aFormed after the Armistice.	1st Rifle Division; 2nd Rifle Division; 3rd Rifle Division	4th Rifle Division; 5th Rifle Division

== Recovery of statehood ==
In 1917 two separate events decisively changed the character of the war and set it on a course toward the rebirth of Poland. The United States entered the conflict on the Allied side, while a process of revolutionary upheaval in Russia weakened it and then removed the Russians from the Eastern Front, finally bringing the Bolsheviks to power in that country. After the last Russian advance into Galicia failed in mid-1917, the Germans went on the offensive again; the army of revolutionary Russia ceased to be a factor, and Russia was forced to sign the Treaty of Brest-Litovsk in which it ceded all formerly Polish lands to the Central Powers.

The defection of Russia from the Allied coalition gave free rein to the calls of Woodrow Wilson, the American president, to transform the war into a crusade to spread democracy and liberate the Poles and other peoples from the suzerainty of the Central Powers. The thirteenth of his Fourteen Points adopted the resurrection of Poland as one of the main aims of World War I. Polish opinion crystallized in support of the Allied cause.

Józef Piłsudski became a popular hero when Berlin jailed him for insubordination. The Allies broke the resistance of the Central Powers by autumn 1918, as the Habsburg monarchy disintegrated and the German imperial government collapsed. In October 1918, Polish authorities took over Galicia and Cieszyn Silesia. In November 1918, Piłsudski was released from internment in Germany by the revolutionaries and returned to Warsaw. Upon his arrival, on November 11, 1918, the Regency Council of the Kingdom of Poland ceded all responsibilities to him and Piłsudski took control over the newly created state as its provisional Chief of State. Soon all the local governments that had been created in the last months of the war pledged allegiance to the central government in Warsaw. Independent Poland, which had been absent from the map of Europe for 123 years, was reborn.

The newly created state initially consisted of former Privislinsky Krai, western Galicia (with Lwów besieged by the Ukrainians) and part of Cieszyn Silesia.

== See also ==
- History of Poland (1795–1918)
- History of Poland (1918–1939)
- Diplomatic history of World War I
- Kingdom of Poland (1917–1918)
