= History of Poland in the modern era =

Poland in the Modern era is covered in:

- History of Poland (1795–1918)
  - Poland during World War I
- History of Poland (1918–1939)
- History of Poland (1939–1945)
- History of Poland (1945–1989)
