= Władysław Galica =

Polish Army officer

Władysław Galica (20 September 1900 in Chicago, United States – 7 September 1943 in Warsaw, Poland) was a Polish Army Colonel.

From 1917 Galica served in the Polish Auxiliary Corps of the Austro-Hungarian Army; he joined the Polish Army at the end of the First World War. In the years preceding the Second World War he was commander of a battalion of the 69th Infantry Regiment.

After the German occupation of Poland he became a member of the Polish resistance Armia Krajowa (codenames: Bródka, Poręba). In 1940 Władysław became commander of the "Kraków area (ZWZ)" and in 1941 Chief-Inspector of the Protection Service of the Uprising (Główny Inspektor Wojskowej Służby Ochrony Powstania). Arrested by the Gestapo in 1943 he was murdered by Germans in Pawiak.
