= Battle of Mołotków =

1914 battle on the Eastern Front of WWI

- Part of the Eastern Front of World War I
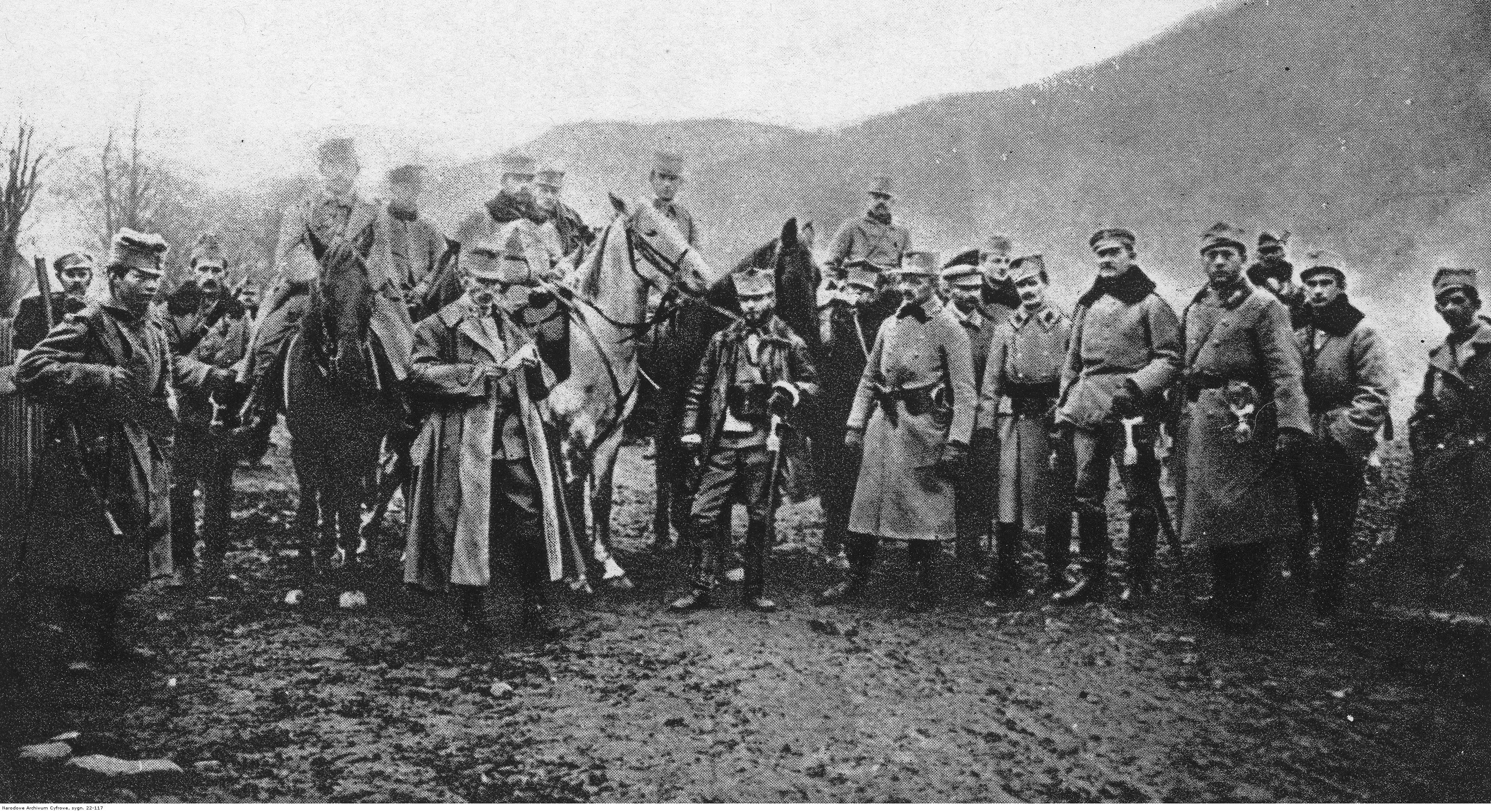
- Polish legionaries
Date	October 29, 1914
Location	Mołotków, Kingdom of Galicia and Lodomeria
Result	Russian victory

Belligerents
Austria-Hungary (Polish Legions)	Russian Empire

Commanders and leaders
Karol Durski-Trzaska; Zygmunt Zieliński; Józef Haller; Bolesław Roja	unknown

Units involved
2nd and 3rd Infantry Regiments, 14 cannons	34th Infantry Division, Cossack regiment, 16 cannons, 24 machine guns

Casualties and losses
200 killed 300 wounded 400 captured	100 killed

The Battle of Mołotków (Polish: Bitwa pod Mołotkowem) took place on October 29, 1914, near the village of Mołotków (Molotkiv), Austrian Galicia (current Ukraine). 2nd and 3rd Infantry Regiments of Polish Legions clashed with units of the Russian Imperial Army, which had invaded Galicia (see Russian occupation of Eastern Galicia, 1914–15). Polish forces were part of Tactical Group of General Karol Durski-Trzaska.

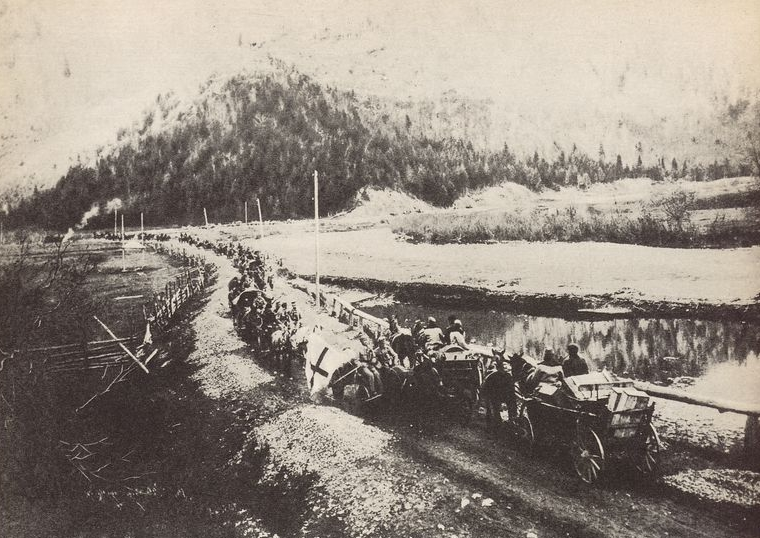
Transport of the wounded

On October 29, the Group of Durski-Trzaska attacked Russian positions in the outskirts of Mołotków. Polish 4th Battalion commanded by Bolesław Roja managed to reach the center of the village, but was then stopped and forced to retreat. Meanwhile, the bulk of both 2nd and 3rd Regiments, with some 6,000 soldiers, fiercely resisted 12 battalions of Russian infantry (15,000) soldiers, supported by 24 machine guns and 16 cannons. The Russians broke through Polish positions, forcing both regiments to retreat, in order to avoid encirclement.

Polish losses amounted to 200 dead, 300 wounded, and 400 captured by the enemy. The Russians lost 100 dead.

The Battle of Mołotków was commemorated in the interwar period on Tomb of the Unknown Soldier, Warsaw, with inscription “MOŁOTKÓW 29 X 1914”. The inscription was removed by Communist authorities, and returned after 1990.

== Sources ==
- Mieczysław Wrzosek, Polski czyn zbrojny podczas pierwszej wojny światowej 1914-1918, Państwowe Wydawnictwo "Wiedza Powszechna", Warszawa 1990
