= Eastern Legion =

Polish military formation

Eastern Legion (Polish: Legion Wschodni) was a Polish military formation, part of the Austro-Hungarian Army, created in Lwów, Austrian Galicia, in early August 1914. Its establishment was supported by Supreme National Committee, a quasi-government for the Poles in Galicia.

The Legion was established upon order of the Headquarters of Imperial and Royal Army, on 27 August 1914. According to the order, it consisted of two infantry regiments (each divided into two battalions with 1,000 volunteers), and two or three cavalry squadrons (150 men in each). Archduke Friedrich, Duke of Teschen named Major Adam Pietraszkiewicz commandant of the Legion, while his chief of staff was Captain Dionizy Jasienicki. Eastern Legion was based on volunteers, most of whom were members of different Polish paramilitary organizations, such as Sokół, Bartosz Brigades, and Polish Rifle Squads from the area of Lwów.

Due to rapid Russian advance into Galicia (see Battle of Galicia), the Legion was on 29 August evacuated to Mszana Dolna, via Sambor, Chyrów, Sanok and Jasło. During the evacuation, which was organized by Count Aleksander Skarbek, the number of its soldiers grew to over 6200.

For unknown reasons, Adam Pietraszkiewicz did not become commandant of the Legion, so his post was offered to Captain Dionizy Jasienicki. Count Skarbek, who was a very influential person in Galicia, opposed this promotion, and as a result, on 14 September Captain Józef Haller became the new commandant of Eastern Legion. Five days later, the Legion arrived at Mszana Dolna.

Eastern Legion was dissolved on 21 September 1914. Most of its volunteers refused to swear allegiance and obedience to the Emperor Franz Joseph I of Austria: only 800 soldiers, most of whom came from Podhale and the Duchy of Teschen, led by Józef Haller and Jan Kozicki, agreed to swear allegiance to Franz Joseph. Out of these soldiers, 3rd Legions' Infantry Regiment was created. The regiment swore the oath on 26 September.

== See also ==
- Polish Legions in World War I
- Riflemen's Association
- First Cadre Company

== Sources ==
- Jan Rzepecki, Sprawa Legionu Wschodniego 1914 roku, Państwowe Wydawnictwo Naukowe, Warszawa 1966.
- Mieczysław Wrzosek, Polski czyn zbrojny podczas pierwszej wojny światowej 1914–1918, Państwowe Wydawnictwo "Wiedza Powszechna", Warszawa 1990, ISBN 83-214-0724-2.
