= Battle of Rarańcza =

1918 Polish victory over Austria Hungary in WWI

- Part of the Eastern Front (World War I)
Date	February 15–16, 1918
Location	Near Rarańcza (Ridkivtsi), Bukovina
Result	Polish victory

Belligerents
(Poland) Polish Legionnaires	Austria-Hungary

Commanders and leaders
(Poland) Józef Haller de Hallenburg (Poland) Michał Żymierski (Poland) Roman Górecki	Unknown

Strength
over 2,000	Unknown

Casualties and losses
Heavy or 16 dead and 900 captive	Unknown

The Battle of Rarańcza was fought between Polish Legionnaires, and Austria-Hungary, from February 15 to 16, 1918, near Rarańcza in Bukovina, and ended with a Polish victory.

== Background ==
The Brest-Litovsk Treaty, which was being negotiated on February 9, 1918, did not appear to benefit the idea of a nation state for Poland. This treaty, signed between the Central Powers (including Austria-Hungary) and the Ukrainian People's Republic on February 9, 1918, transferred the province of Chełm to the Ukrainian state. Poles, meanwhile, believed that the town of Chełm and surrounding lands should be under Polish control.

The Polish forces, part of the Austro-Hungarian Army stationed on the border of Bessarabia, were increasingly restless. They were relatively spread out throughout the region over a frontline 250 km in length. They consisted of the Polish Auxiliary Corps (known as the II Brigade of Polish Legionnaires up till the recent oath crisis), as well as some additional Polish units. The Poles, having received the information about the treaty on February 12, and expecting, in the aftermath of the treaty further weakening of the Polish units, decided on the February 14 to join forces with the Polish First Army Corps in Russia by crossing the Austrian-Russian front lines. Only a few, including general Zygmunt Zieliński, proposed taking no action, however even Zieliński unofficially supported the mutiny.

== Battle ==
Polish units, mostly the 2nd and 3rd Regiment under the command of Józef Haller de Hallenburg, attempted to break through the Austrian lines on February 15 to 16, 1918. Austrian forces were ordered to stop them, and fighting ensued in several places (while in others Austrian units withdrew). The main Polish units broke through the Austro-Hungarian Army near a town called Rarańcza, located in Bukovina, but the rear units with wagons were stopped by an armored train, and eventually disarmed and arrested.

== Aftermath ==
The Legionnaires won the battle, but estimates of their losses vary: according to historian Jerzy Lerski they suffered "great losses", but Gawlik states there were only 16 casualties, while over 900 soldiers of the Auxiliary Corps and other Polish soldiers from other formations - about 4,000 total - were arrested). 86 officers and NCOs were later put to trial by the Austro-Hungarian government, but Charles I of Austria-Hungary ordered the trial to be stopped, and a few weeks later Austria-Hungary was no more.

Some (according to Gawlik, about 1,600) of Haller's troops were able to make it through the front lines into already abandoned Russian trenches, and on March 5 were absorbed into the Polish Second Corps, whilst many were captured and imprisoned by the Austrians. The remaining troops under general Haller would be defeated in May by the Germans in the battle of Kaniów.
