= 4th Rifle Division (Poland) =

Polish military unit

The Polish 4th Rifle Division (Polish: 4. Dywizja Strzelców Polskich, Russian: Полская 4-я Стрелковая Дивизия) was a Polish military unit, forming, together with the Polish 5th Rifle Division of the Blue Army, the only part of the Polish military which took part in the Russian Civil War. Under the command of General Lucjan Żeligowski, it operated as an ally of the White movement from autumn 1918 to August 1919 in southern Russia and Bessarabia.

== History and operations ==
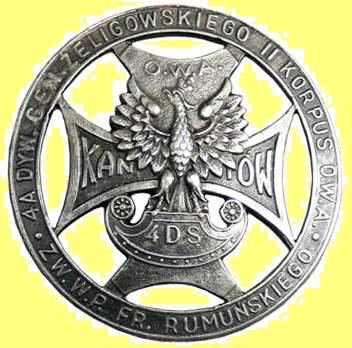
4th Rifle Division badge

The 4th Rifle Division could trace its origins to the Polish 2nd Corps in Russia. The 2nd Corps was formed from various Polish units, but primarily the 2nd Brigade of the Polish Legions in World War I, which rebelled against the Treaty of Brest-Litovsk and decided to join the newly-forming Polish army and help secure the territories inhabited by the Poles in the Kresy region. The Polish 5th Rifle Division found itself fighting in the northern territories of the former Russian Empire; the 4th, in its southern regions.

The ever-changing and chaotic currents of the Russian Civil War, coupled with the weak chain of command of the newly reborn Polish Army, meant that the local commanders had much autonomy; thus the 2nd Corps found it most useful to ally itself with the forces of the White movement, even though Polish commander-in-chief Józef Piłsudski declined to support the Whites with any other units after he had established firm control over the Polish forces in 1919. Nonetheless this meant that the soldiers of the 2nd Corps were fighting the Bolsheviks and their Red Army even before the Polish-Soviet War began in 1919.

After the Battle of Kaniów on 11 May 1918, in which the forces of the 2nd Brigade broke through the front and created the 2nd Corps, the Polish commanders entered the alliance with one of the White generals, Mikhail Alekseev, and his Volunteer Army in the northern Caucasus near the Kuban River. By September 1918 the Polish forces in the region, called the 'Polish Unit of the Volunteer Army', numbered over 700 people under the command of Col. Franciszek Zieliński, and were engaged in several battles with the Bolsheviks.

In October 1918 General Lucjan Żeligowski assumed command of the Polish forces in the east from General Haller. At the same time, General Alekseev died, and General Anton Ivanovich Denikin assumed the command of the White forces in the region. The local Polish forces were reorganized into the Polish 4th Rifle Division, subordinated to the 2nd Corps of the Blue Army of General Józef Haller. By the end of January 1919 the division numbered over 2800 men, including many from the now-disbanded Polish 1st Corps in Russia.

At that time Piłsudski ordered the Polish units in the far East to move close to the core Polish territory. Denikin, who received this order through French General Ferdinand Foch, ordered Żeligowski to move to Odessa, a major port west of Crimea. Żeligowski reorganized and strengthened the units in the area, and in December 1918 he found himself facing the Ukrainian forces of Symon Petlura. Reinforced by French and Greek troops, it helped to secure Odessa as part of the Allied Southern Russia Intervention and took part in the fights near Tiraspol. In March 1919 the unit numbered about 3000 men, including a sizeable cavalry contingent.

By the end of March the division, and the Allied forces, were no longer fighting the Ukrainians, but the Bolsheviks. Żeligowski was able to influence the placement of his unit, and until May the division successfully screened the retreat of Allied troops from Odessa towards the Romanian lines in Bessarabia. Near the end of May the division was relieved and finally transported to Poland. It was the only major Polish military formation that took part in the Russian Civil War and managed to return to Poland as a functioning unit.

The division then took part in the last phase of the ongoing Polish-Ukrainian War, starting from the area near Chernivtsi and Stanyslaviv. This time it was not fighting Petliura (who was soon to become a Polish ally), but one of the other Ukrainian factions, the West Ukrainian National Republic. From 11 to 13 July the division fought its first (and victorious) battle near a town with a sizeable Polish population in the area, Jazłowiec.

On 19 July 1919 the division was reformed into the Polish 10th Infantry Division and took part in the major conflict of that time, the Polish-Soviet War.

== See also ==
- 4th Infantry Division (Poland)
- Polish Armed Forces in the East (1914–20)
