= Jan Berek =

Austrian soldier (1896–1986)

Jan Zygmunt Emil Berek (1896–1986) was a soldier of the Austro-Hungarian Army and Generał brygady of the Polish Army, who fought in World War I, Polish–Soviet War and the Invasion of Poland.

Born on 19 August 1896 in Nowy Sącz, Austrian Galicia, Berek studied medicine at the Jagiellonian University in Kraków. In May 1918 he joined Polish Military Organisation, and in November of the same year he fought in the Battle of Lemberg, as leader of a company in 5th Legions' Infantry Regiment. In February 1919, Berek became company leader in the 9th Legions Infantry Regiment, stationed at Lublin. He remained in his post until April 1926, fighting in the Polish–Soviet War. On 1 June 1919 Berek was promoted to major.

In the second half of 1926, Berek served in 83rd Infantry Regiment at Kobryn. In December 1926 he was transferred back to 9th Legions Infantry Regiment, and in the period May 1929 – September 1931, he attended Wyższa Szkoła Wojenna in Warsaw. After completing his officer course, he was chief of staff of the 4th Infantry Division, stationed in Toruń (1931–1934), and in 1934 – 36, he commanded 1st Rifle Battalion in Chojnice. Promoted to Lieutenant Colonel on 1 January 1935, Berek served at the Polish General Staff (October 1936 – July 1939). A few weeks before the Invasion of Poland, he was sent to Jarosław, to command 3rd Legions' Infantry Regiment. Berek remained in his post until the capitulation of Modlin Fortress, on 29 September 1939 (see Battle of Modlin).

After the capitulation of Modlin, Berek was captured and spent World War II in an Oflag. Released in May 1945, he went first to Italy and then to Great Britain, settling in London. He was an active member of Polish emigree circles, in 1958 founding the Association of Polish Philatelists in Great Britain. On 26 May 1978 Berek was named chairman of Supreme Audit Office in Exile, replacing Władysław Zaleski. On 15 May, following the decision of President in Exile Edward Raczyński, Berek became Minister of Military Affairs in the government of Prime Minister Kazimierz Sabbat. In 1983, Berek was promoted to Generał brygady.

Jan Berek died on 18 June 1986 in London.

== Awards ==
- Gold Cross of the Virtuti Militari,
- Silver Cross of the Virtuti Militari (1921),
- Cavalier's Cross of the Order of Polonia Restituta,
- Commander's Cross of the Order of Polonia Restituta,
- Cross of Valour (Poland),
- Gold Cross of Merit (Poland).

== Sources ==
- Tadeusz Kryska-Karski, Stanisław Żurakowski, Generałowie Polski niepodległej, Editions Spotkania, Warszawa 1991
