= Polish Auxiliary Corps =

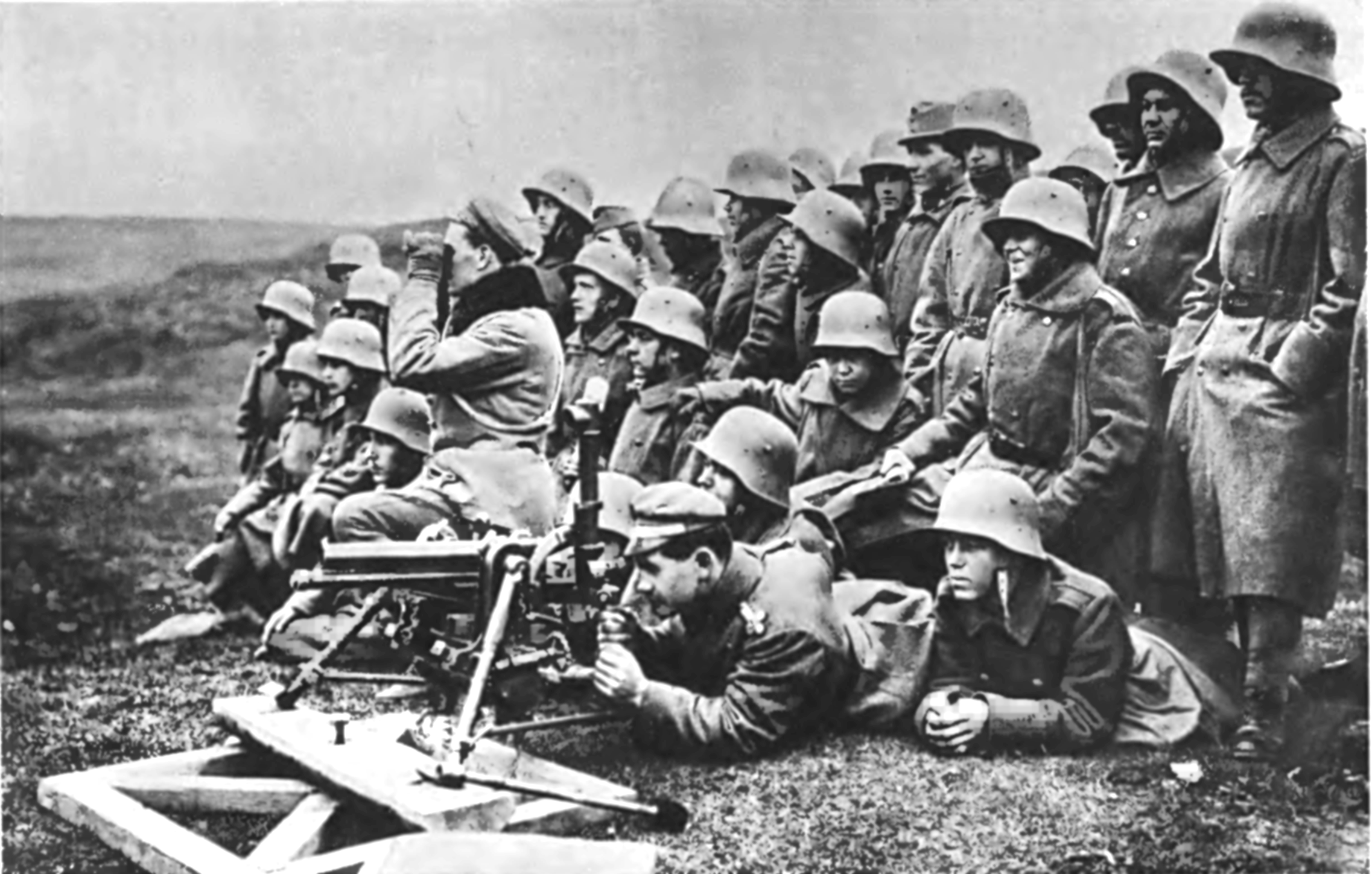
2nd Infantry Regiment of the Polish Auxiliary Corps in Bukovina

Polish Auxiliary Corps (Polish: Polski Korpus Posiłkowy, Austrian German: Polnisches Hilfskorps, Hungarian: Lengyel Segédhadtest) was the name of the Polish military formation in the Austro-Hungarian Army. Formed from the Polish Legions, it was created on 20 September 1916 and existed until 19 February 1918. In the aftermath of the Oath crisis, some members of the corps, mainly the 1st, and 3rd Brigades, were forcibly drafted into the main Austro-Hungarian Army or imprisoned. Those of the 2nd Brigade remained in The Polish Auxiliary Corps and formed the basis for the German Polnische Wehrmacht. This lasted until 16 February 1918, when Jozef Haller and the 2nd Brigade rebelled, due to the unfavorable terms found within the Treaty of Brest-Litovsk, leading to the corps' disbandment. Members of this formation fought in the Battle of Rarańcza and Battle of Kaniów, merging with the Polish II Corps in Russia.
