= 2nd Legions Home Army Infantry Division =

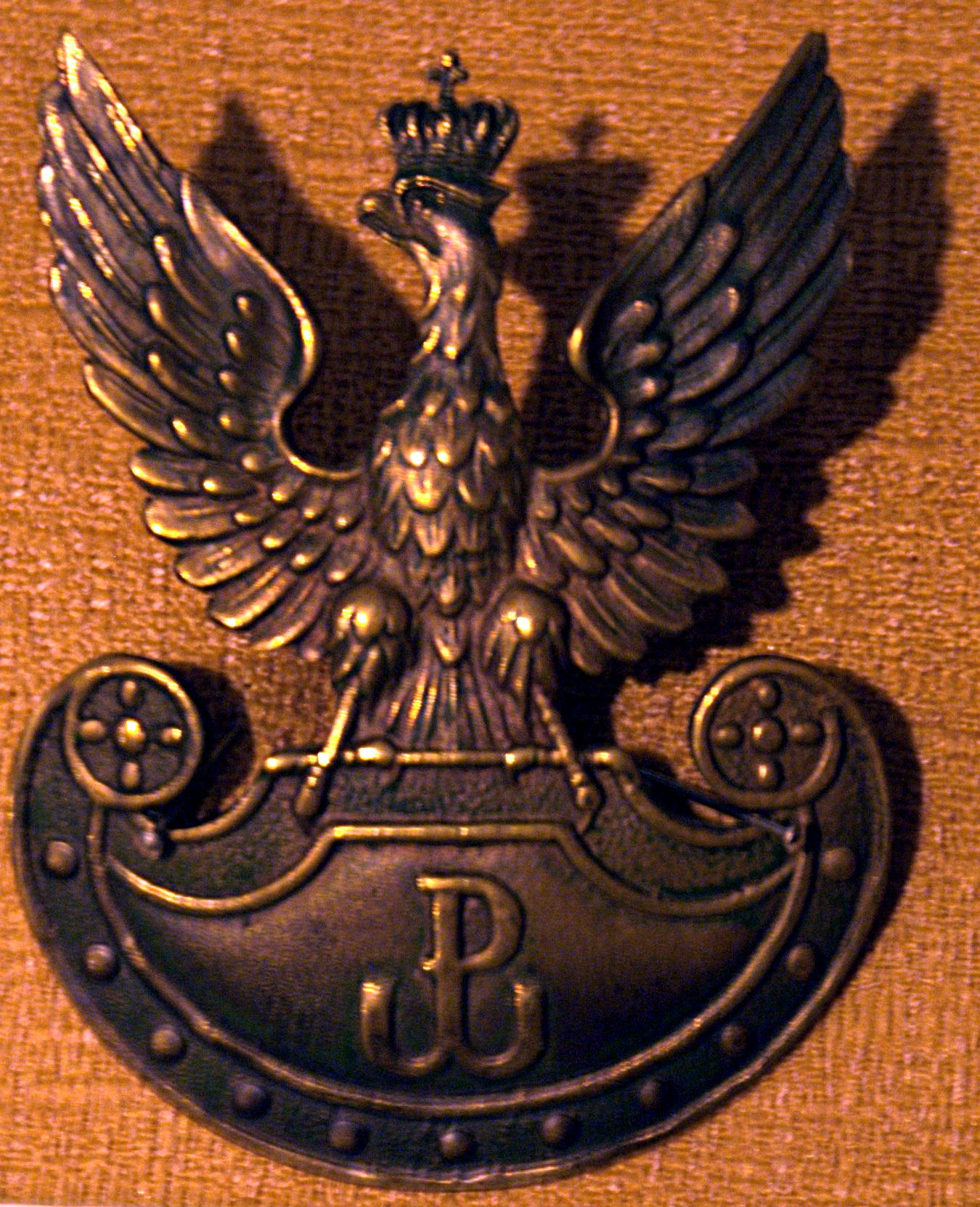
- Active: 1944 – 8 October 1944
- Country: Poland
- Branch: Home Army
- Role: Infantry
- Nickname(s): "Pogon"
- Engagements: World War II: Operation Tempest

Commanders
- Notable commanders: Colonel Antoni Zolkiewski

The 2nd Legions Home Army Infantry Division “Pogon” (Polish: 2 Dywizja Piechoty Legionow AK "Pogon", 2 DP Leg. AK) was a unit of the Polish Home Army (AK), created in 1944 in the Home Army District Radom - Kielce. Creation of the division was based on a September 1942 order of the AK headquarters, which stated that in the future Operation Tempest, the Home Army units were to be named after pre-September 1939 units of the Polish Armed Forces. Therefore, the Second Legions Home Army Infantry Division was based on and named after the 2nd Legions Infantry Division, which until the Invasion of Poland had its headquarters in Kielce.

== Structure ==
The Division was commanded by Colonel Antoni Zolkiewski (nom de guerre “Lin”), while his chief of staff was Captain Michal Mandziara “Siwy”.

The Second Legions Home Army Infantry Division “Pogon” consisted of the following subunits:

- 2nd Legions Infantry Regiment of the Home Army, under Major Antoni Wiktorowski “Kruk,
- 3rd Legions Infantry Regiment of the Home Army, under Major Stanislaw Poreda “Swiatek”,
- 4th Legions Infantry Regiment of the Home Army, under Major Jozef Wlodarczyk “Wyrwa”,
- reconnaissance squadron, under rittmeister Karol Wickenhagen “Pobog”,
- platoon of military police under Colonel Dionizy Medrzycki “Reder”,
- divisional services.

== Operation Tempest ==
In mid-August 1944, when the Division concentrated for the Operation Tempest, it had 3,075 soldiers, with 1,107 serving in the largest subunit, the 2nd Legions Infantry Regiment. On August 20, the Division, concentrated near Przysucha, set off towards Warsaw, to fight in the Warsaw Uprising. Since this turned out to be impossible, as the route northwards was blocked by strong German units, on August 23 the Division headed towards Checiny, planning to capture Kielce. On August 26, it fought the Wehrmacht in the village of Dziebaldow. In September 1944, it took part in a number of skirmishes and battles.

On October 8, 1944, following the order of headquarters of the Home Army District Radom - Kielce, the division was disbanded due to deteriorating general situation, shortage of food and autumn conditions. After this order, its subunits acted independently, fighting the Wehrmacht until late autumn 1944.

== Murder of Jews ==
The "Wybraniecki" unit, commanded by Marian Sołtysiak ("Barabasz") which was part of the 4th Legions Infantry Regiment, murdered hiding Jews and their helpers on a number of occasions. In order to purge their own ranks of Jews in hiding, the unit examined the genitalia of members, executing on the basis of circumcision.
