= Battle of Rafajlowa =

WW1 battle

Coordinates: 48°27′50″N 24°14′50″E

- Part of the Eastern Front during World War I
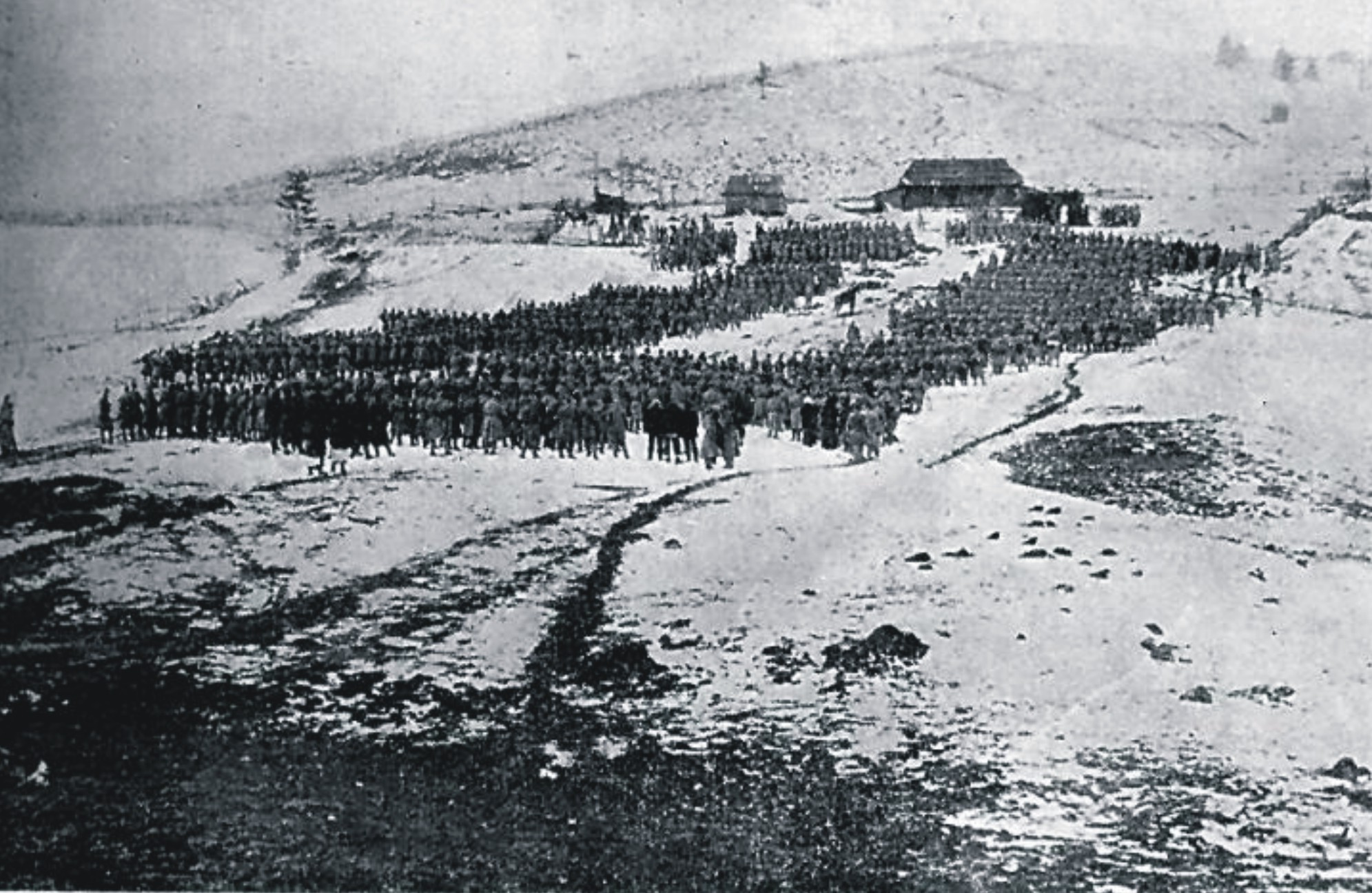
- Field service for soldiers of the Polish Legions in Rafajlowa, 1915
Date	23–24 January 1915
Location	Village of Rafajlowa, Austria-Hungary (present-day Ukraine)
Result	Austro-Hungarian victory

Belligerents
Austria-Hungary (Polish Legions)	Russian Empire

Commanders and leaders
(Austria-Hungary) Henryk Minkiewicz	Zolotin

Strength
Unknown	4,000 men: 2 battalions (With Cossacks and artillery support)

Casualties and losses
5–40	400

The Battle of Rafajlowa took place in the night of January 23–24, 1915, during World War I. The 2nd Brigade, Polish Legions, which was part of the Austro-Hungarian Army repelled a night raid of the Russian Imperial Army, which was aimed at blocking all passes through Gorgany mountain range in Eastern Carpathians. The battle took place in the village of Rafajlowa, Austrian Galicia (now the village is called Bystrytsia, and belongs to Ukraine).

== Background ==
In late September 1914, 3rd Legions Infantry Regiment, which was part of forces of General Karl von Pflanzer-Baltin was sent to the Eastern Carpathians, in order to prevent Russian advance into Hungary and Transilvania. 1st and 4th Battalion of the Regiment were stationed in the mountain village of Ust-Chorna, which lies in the Gorgany range. On October 16, 1914, both units were sent to the area of Brustura (today: Lopuchiv, Ukraine). Rafajlowa, which lies on the other side of the range, was an important strategic point, and gateway to the attack towards east and south.

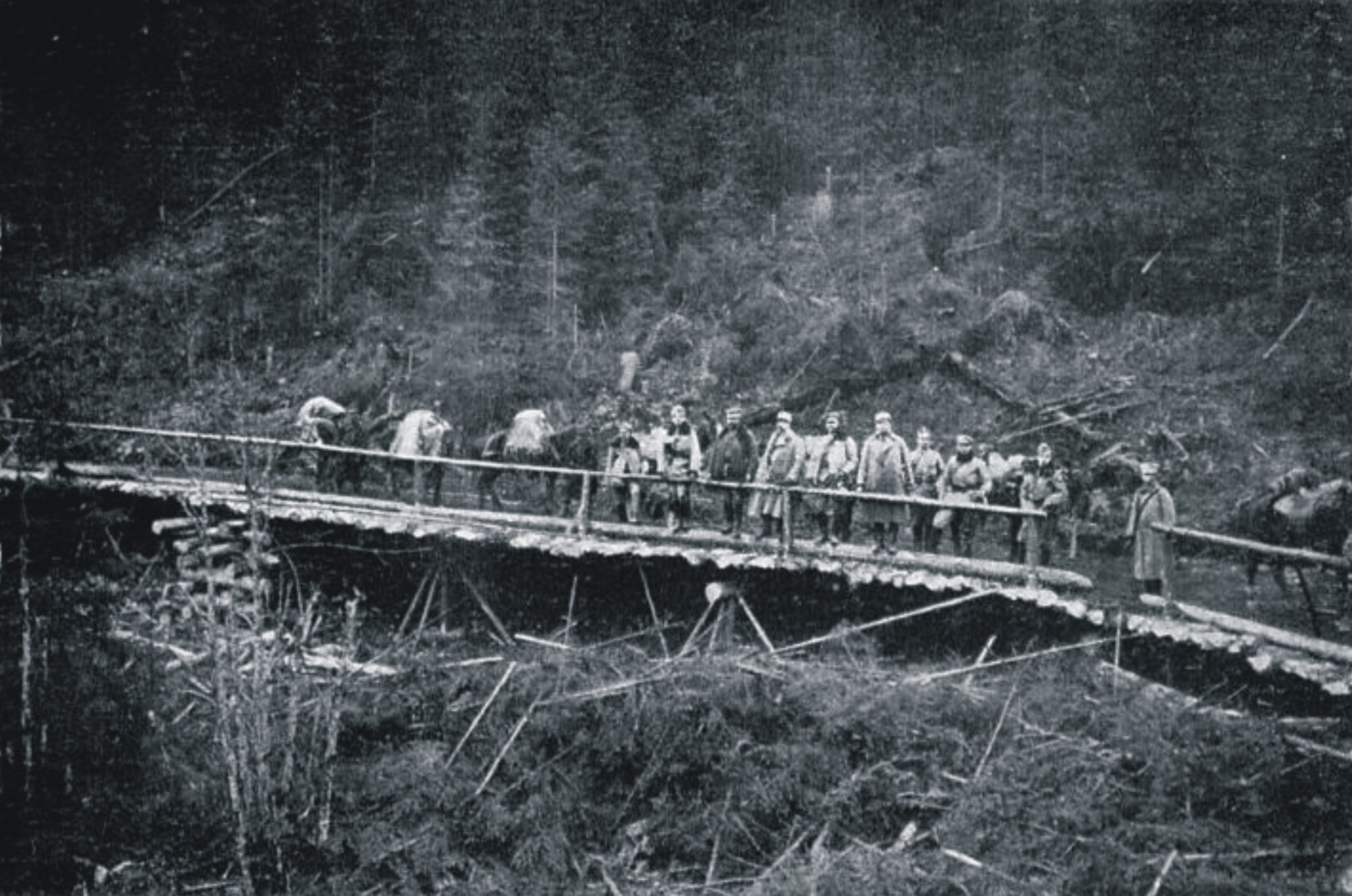
A bridge on the so-called Legions Road, 1915

On October 12, Rafajlowa was captured by a battalion commanded by Captain Józef Haller. Further objectives of Polish forces were to build a road through the Gorgany and initiate an offensive towards Nadworna, in order to pull enemy forces out of the valley of the Stryi River.

Soldiers of the 3rd Battalion, tasked with construction of the road, managed to build it in record time of 50 hours. The road, which came to be known as "The Legions Road" connected Teresva, Kingdom of Hungary (now Zakarpattia Oblast, Ukraine) with Rafajlowa (now Bystrycia, Ivano-Frankivsk Oblast, Ukraine), which at that time was located on northern, Galician side of the mountains. Construction began on October 16, and was overseen by engineer and colonel Jan Sluszkiewicz. Mountain road was paved with 4-meter wooden planks, 28 bridges were constructed: some of them were 50-meter long. The length of the road was over 7 kilometers, and 5000 cubic meters of wood were used.

On October 19 the 2nd Brigade began to cross the mountains. The journey lasted 3 days, by October 22 in the evening, the headquarters with all officers, artillery and cavalry had reached Rajalfowa on the northern, Galician side of the range. Polish soldiers continued their advance northwards, capturing villages in the area.

== The battle ==
The battle of Rafajlowa can be divided into three smaller battles, which took place in late 1914 and early 1915. The largest one was in the night of January 23/24, 1915.

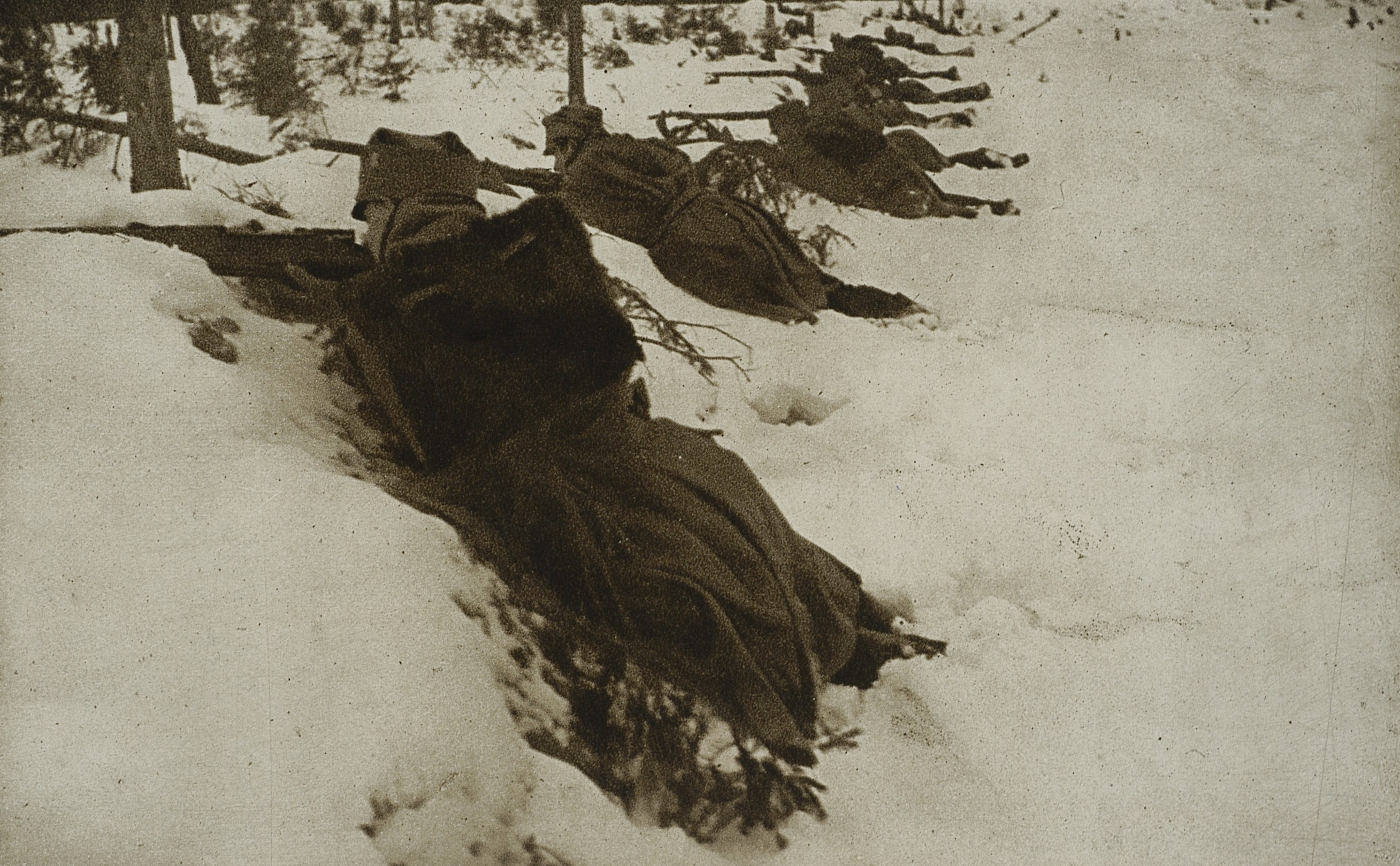
Polish legionaries

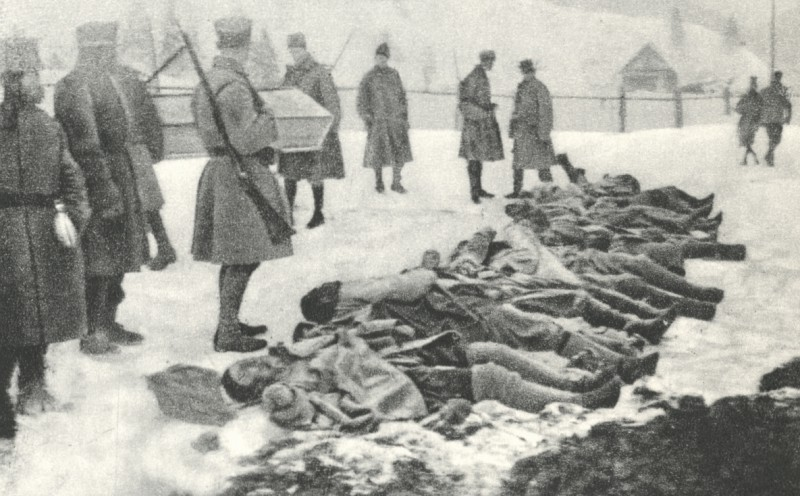
Funerals after the battle

In mid-January 1915, news of a planned Austrian offensive reached Polish soldiers. Since Rafajlowa was regarded as a strategic point, the Russians were keen to forestall Austrian advance and attack first. Furthermore, on January 20 Józef Haller left for a short leave.

On January 24, at 00:45, two Russian battalions, reinforced with Cossacks and artillery (altogether 4000 men) began the attack. They quickly captured first two lines of Polish trenches and a hospital building. For unknown reason, Russians decided then to stop their advance, and Poles, commanded by Captain Henryk Minkiewicz, took advantage of this. They regrouped and attacked the trenches, taking the enemy by surprise. Both sides used bayonets, and the battle continued until morning, when Polish reinforcements attacked from both sides, forcing Russians to retreat from Rafajlowa.

Several traces of fighting can still be seen in Rafajlowa, including parts of the Legions Road and trenches. Furthermore, near former Roman Catholic church there is a commemorative obelisk. A Legions Cross was erected on the Pantyr mountain, there also is a field cemetery. Polish losses in the battle are unknown, they range from 5 to 40.

== Sources ==
- Henryk Lewartowski, Bolesław Pochmarski, J. A. Teslar: Szlakiem bojowym Legionów. Krótki zarys organizacyi i dziejów 2 Brygady Legionów Polskich w Karpatach, Galicyi i na Bukowinie. Oprac...oficerowie Legionów Polskich. Nakł. Funduszu Wdów i Sierot po Legionistach, Lwów 1915.
- Stanisław Czerep: II Brygada Legionów Polskich. Bellona, 1991. ISBN 83-11-07889-0.

== See also ==
- 2nd Brigade, Polish Legions
- Polish Legions in World War I
- First Cadre Company
- Polish Military Organisation
