= Zygmunt Zieliński (1858–1925) =

Polish general (1858–1925)

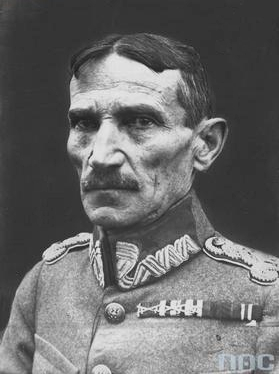
- Born: August 1, 1858; Rzeszotary, Austrian Empire
- Died: April 11, 1925 (aged 66); Kraków, Poland
- Occupation: Military officer

Zygmunt Zieliński (1 August 1858 – 11 April 1925) was a Polish general. He reached the rank of colonel in the Austro-Hungarian Army.

In 1914, he volunteered for the Polish Legions, where he commanded the 3rd Brigade, Polish Legions from 1915. From 1917 to 1918, he commanded the Polish Auxiliary Corps. After World War I ended, he participated in the Polish-Ukrainian War and the Polish-Soviet War, commanding the Polish 3rd Army. He retired in 1922.

== Awards ==
- Order of the White Eagle (1921)
- Commander's Cross of the Virtuti Militari
- Silver Cross of the Virtuti Militari
- Cross of Independence
- Cross of Valor (four times)
- Commander's Cross of the Legion of Honour

== Bibliography ==
(in Polish)

- Tadeusz Kryska-Karski, Stanisław Żurakowski: Generałowie Polski Niepodległej, Editions Spotkania, Warszawa 1991, pp. 27.
- Piotr Stawecki, Słownik biograficzny generałów Wojska Polskiego 1918-1939, Warszawa 1994, ISBN 83-11-08262-6, pp. 367–368.
- Marian Porwit, Spojrzenia poprzez moje życie, Czytelnik, Warszawa 1986, ISBN 83-07-01535-9, pp. 63, 66.
- Piotr Hapanowicz, Generał Zygmunt Zieliński (1858–1925), "Gazeta Wyborcza" Kraków, 14 February 2005.
- Piotr Hapanowicz, Żywot legionisty. Generał Zygmunt Zieliński, "Kraków", 9/2008, pp. 48–49.
- Media related to Zygmunt Zieliński at Wikimedia Commons
