= Karol Durski-Trzaska =

Austrian military officer (1849–1935)

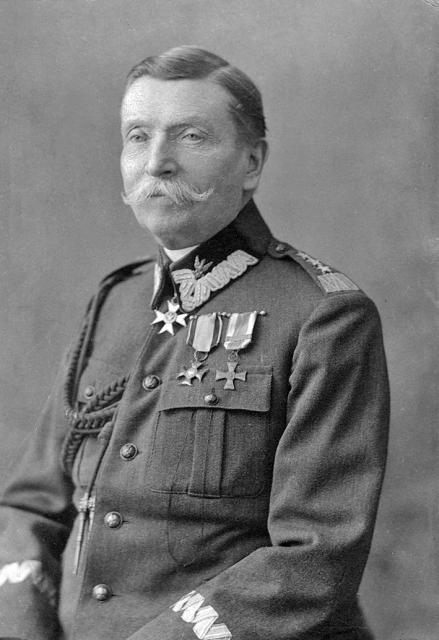
- Born: September 6, 1849; Spas, Austrian Empire
- Died: August 15, 1935 (aged 85); Wadowice, Poland
- Military career
- Allegiance: Austria-Hungary; Poland
- Branch: Austro-Hungarian Army; Polish Army
- Rank: Feldmarschalleutnant (Major general); Generał broni (Lieutenant general)
- Commands: Commendant of Polish Legions
- Conflicts: World War I
- Awards: Silver Cross of the Order of Virtuti Militari; Commander's Cross of the Polonia Restituta

Karol Durski-Trzaska (1849–1935) was an officer in the Austro-Hungarian Army and later, Polish Army. Reached the rank of Lieutenant General (Feldmarschalleutnant) in Austrian-Hungarian Army; commander of Austrian Polish Legions in World War I from 23 September 1914 to December 1915. Transferred to reserve afterwards. He served in the Polish Army from 1919 to 1922, in reserve again afterwards. Recipient of the Silver Cross of the Virtuti Militari and the Commander's Cross of the Polonia Restituta.

== Biography ==
In the years 1864-1868 he was a student in the Military School in Hranice (German: Mährisch Weißkirchen). He beagn his service in Imperial and Royal Army on 1 October 1868. He was serving in Divisional Artillery Regiment No. 8 in Radgersburg since 1893, until 1895 when he was transferred to the Divisional Artillery Regiment No. 32 in Lviv. Four years later he became a regimental commander of the Divisional Artillery Regiment No. 28, stationed in Przemyśl. In 1904 he moved to Lviv and he took over command of the Corps Artillery Regiment No. 11. On 9 November 1907 he was promoted to Generalmajor with seniority from November 1, 1907 and was appointed commander of the 6th Artillery Brigade in Košice.

On 30 September 1908 he retired from the army with the rank of Generalmajor. On 16 May 1912 he was appointed titular lieutenant field marshal (Feldmarschalleutnant).

At the outbrake of World War I he was called up from retirement to active service. Between 23 September 1914 and December 1915 he was the commander of the Polish Legions in Austria. On 24 December 1915 he was promoted to the rank of Feldmarschalleutnant. He was serving in the army until 16 March 1916, when he retired once again.

From March 1919 he served in the newly formed Polish Army. Until September 20, 1920, he commanded the General District "Warsaw" and he was a member of War Council. On 1 October 1920 he was appointed, by the Minister of Military Affairs general Kazimierz Sosnkowski, as the Inspector of Officers' Institutions. Two months later on 21 December 1920 he became a chairman of the General Verification Commission. On 1 April 1921, he retired, at the rank of Lieutenant General (pol. generał broni). On 26 October 1923, the President of the Republic of Poland Stanisław Wojciechowski confirmed him at the rank of Lieutenant General. He lived in Gniew and Wadowice. He was married to Anna Edlbacher, with whom he had two daughters and two sons, officers of the Polish Army. One of his sons Antoni was a colonel in the Polish Army.

== Promotions ==
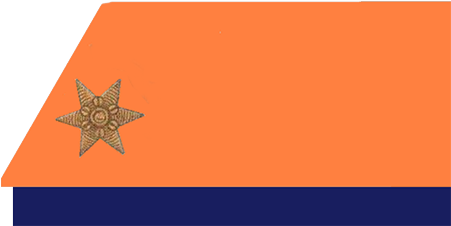
- Leutnant (Second lieutenant) - 1868
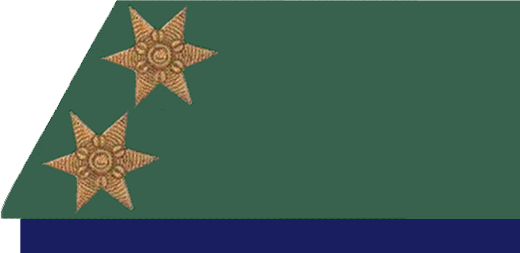
- Oberleutnant (First lieutenant) - 1875
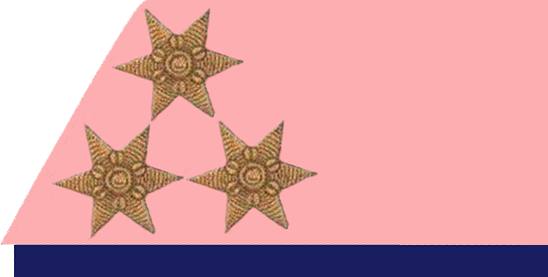
- Hauptmann (Captain) - 1887
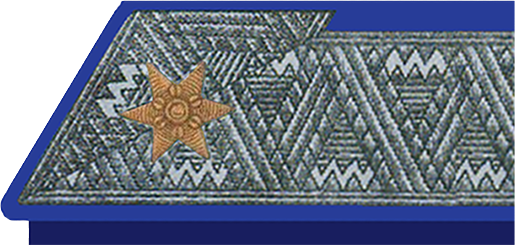
- Major (Major) - 1 January 1894
- Oberstleutnant (Lieutenant colonel) - 1 May 1898
- Oberts (Colonel) - 1 November 1901
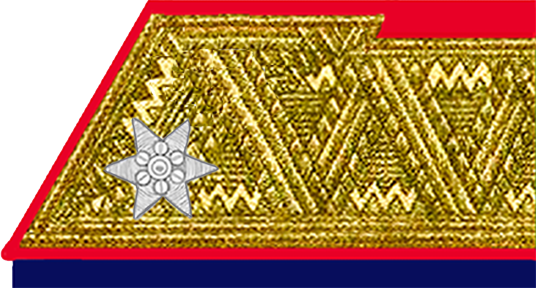
- Generalmajor (Brigadier general) - 9 November 1907
- Feldmarschalleutnant (Major general) - 16 May 1912
- Generał broni (Lieutenant general) - 26 October 1923

== Awards and decorations ==
- Silver Cross of Virtuti Militari
- Commander's Cross of Order of Polonia Restituta
- Cross of Valour (twice)
- Golden Cross of Merit
- Knight of Order of Leopold (Austria-Hungary, 1914)
- Order of the Iron Crown, 3rd Class (Austria-Hungary)
- Military Merit Cross (Austria-Hungary)
- War Medal 1873 (Austria-Hungary)
- 1908 Jubilee Cross (Austria-Hungary)
- Iron Cross, 2nd Class (German Empire)
