= 1st Polish Corps in Russia =

Polish formation of the Russian Army (1917)

- I Korpus Polski w Rosji; 1-й Польский корпус
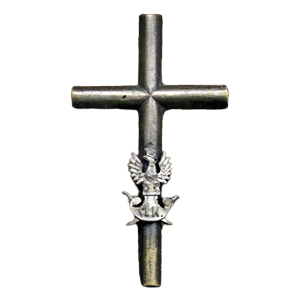
- Active: 24 July 1917 – 21 May 1918
- Country: Russian Republic
- Branch: Russian Army
- Size: 29,000 (mid-January 1918)
- Engagements: World War I Russian Civil War

Commanders
- First Commander: Józef Dowbor-Muśnicki

1st Polish Corps in Russia (Polish: I Korpus Polski w Rosji; Russian: 1-й Польский корпус) was a military formation formed on 24 July 1917 in Minsk from Polish and Lithuanian personnel serving in the Western and Northern Fronts of the Russian Army.

In the chaotic period at the end of World War I on the Eastern Front, the Polish I Corps fought against the Red Army, cooperated with the German Ober Ost forces in taking Minsk, and after acknowledging the Regency Council in May 1918, it surrendered to the German forces in Babruysk. The soldiers were given safe passage to Warsaw, where they became part of the newly created Polish Army.

== History ==
=== Formation ===
The corps was formed at the initiative of the Chief Polish Military Committee (Polish: Naczelny Polski Komitet Wojskowy; CPMC), a Polish faction in the revolutionary and split Russian Empire military. Its goal was to defend Poles inhabiting parts of Poland under Russian partitions and support the formation of independent Poland.

In the immediate aftermath of the February Revolution, the Russian Provisional Government's obvious weakness, its half-hearted declaration of the right of nations to self-determination and Germany's promises of autonomy in occupied Poland stirred up long suppressed nationalist feelings among ethnic Poles living within the Russian Empire since the partitions of Poland. Roughly 700,000 of them were serving in the Russian military by 1917 and they began forming a Polish army to fight for a "united and free Poland" with the assent of the Provisional Government and general Lavr Kornilov of the Russian Army. In August, the newly formed CPMC, a Polish faction in the revolutionary and divided Russian Empire, led by Władysław Raczkiewicz, appointed Dowbor-Muśnicki Commissar of the Petrograd Military District and on August 23 (Old Style) he was appointed commander of the newly formed Polish 1st Corps in Russia, being formed in Russia as part of the Entente forces, serving under the Russian Provisional Government in exchange for its support for some form of Polish autonomy or independence.

The reorganization process was complicated by the October Revolution of 1917, which brought Bolsheviks to power, but Dowbor-Muśnicki was able to take advantage of the new government's weakness and general anarchy and, by mid-January 1918, had organised his forces into:

- 1st Polish Rifle Division (from the former Polish Rifle Division),
- 2nd Polish Rifle Division,
- 3rd Polish Rifle Division,
- Lancer Division,
- in addition to Officers' (later Knights') Legion.

At that time the I Corps numbered almost 30,000 men, although the number would fall to 23,500 over the coming months.

=== Combat ===
At first, after the fall of the Provisional Government, Dowbor-Muśnicki declared that his corps was neutral towards the Russian factions, and intended to join the Entente forces to fight against Germany and Austria-Hungary. Soon, however, it became apparent that this was an unreasonable plan, as the Entente forces in the area were weak, and out of two dominant forces — the German Ober Ost forces, and Russian Bolsheviks - the Bolsheviks were much more hostile towards the Polish forces.

==== Fights against Bolsheviks ====
On 25 January [O.S. 12 January] 1918, Dowbor-Muśnicki refused an order by the Soviet government to disband the Corps, which quickly led to clashes with the newly formed Red Army and Red Latvian riflemen under Jukums Vācietis. After sporadic fighting in late January, on January 31 Dowbor-Muśnicki's Corps had to retreat from Minsk to Babruysk. On February 2, the Corps started sieging the fortress in Babruysk, still held by a Red Army garrison of 7,000. During this siege, the Knight's Legion distinguished itself and the fortress fell on 11 March. However, the German army forced the Polish forces to give over the fortress.

==== Brest-Litovsk Treaty ====
After the temporary breakdown of the Brest-Litovsk peace negotiations on February 10, the Corps also received a status of auxiliary unit from the Germans and joined the German offensive against the Bolsheviks on February 18, and Minsk was taken on 21 February. After a week, on 28 February, the Polish agreed to work with Germans and thus occupied 6 Belarusian districts in the triangle of Mogilev-Zhlobin-Slutsk, with their headquarters at Babruysk. This strategic disposition cut Bolshevik communications between Petrograd and Ukraine.

After the signing of the Brest-Litovsk Peace Treaty, which gave all of Poland and Belarus to Germany, Dowbor-Muśnicki's corps remained in Belarus for 3 months, regrouping and performing police duties under German occupation authorities. On May 21, 1918, Dowbor-Muśnicki after acknowledging the Regency Council signed an agreement with the Germans, under which the Corps agreed to be disarmed and disbanded, after which, anyhow, the units retreated to Poland, forming the core of the Polish military, which proved decisive later that year during the formation of the Polish Army. Soldiers who remained in Russia mostly joined the Polish II Corps in Russia (primarily the 4th Rifle Division).

=== Lithuanians in the Corps ===
There were numerous Lithuanian soldiers in the Corps. In summer 1917, there were many Lithuanians in the Corps, especially in these particular units:

- 1st Regiment - 500 Lithuanians
- 2nd Regiment - more than 400 Lithuanians

The 3rd and 4th Regiments also had many Lithuanians in their ranks, with the zapasnam Regiment having 1,000 Lithuanians in it.

== Officers' Legion ==
An 'Officers' Legion' was formed in December 1917 from 300 surplus officers, itself being divided into company-sized 'Legions':

- Cavalry Legion,
- 2nd Infantry Legion,
- 3rd Artillery Legion,
- Special Weapons Legion.

A half-year later, on 20 April 1918, the Legion had grown to a 1,000 strong and was renamed to 'Knight's Legion' (Polish: Legia Rycerska), being divided into:

- 1st Battalion,
- 2nd Battalion,
- Artillery platoon.

== Commander ==
On 6 August 1917, Lavr Kornilov, the Commander-in-Chief of the Provisional Government's armed forces, appointed Józef Dowbor-Muśnicki as the commander of the Polish I Corps.

== Organisation ==
Units attached to the Corps:

- Reserve Brigade:
  - 1st Reserve Regiment,
  - 2nd Reserve Regiment
- Officers’ Legion (December 1917) / Knight's Legion (20 April 1918);
- 1st Artillery Brigade
- 2nd Artillery Brigade;
- 1st Heavy Artillery Battalion;
- Armoured train "Związek Broni";
- I Polish Corps Aviation (19 August 1917);
- 1st Engineer Regiment;

1st Polish Rifle Division (autumn 1917)

- 1st Polish Rifle Regiment (February 1917);
- 2nd Polish Rifle Regiment;
- 3rd Polish Rifle Regiment;
- 4th Polish Rifle Regiment;
- 1st Artillery Brigade;
- Engineer Company

2nd Polish Rifle Division (autumn 1917)

- 5th Polish Rifle Regiment (February 1917);
- 6th Polish Rifle Regiment;
- 7th Polish Rifle Regiment;
- 8th Polish Rifle Regiment;
- 2nd Artillery Brigade;
- Engineer Company

3rd Polish Rifle Division (autumn 1917)

- 9th Polish Rifle Regiment;
- 10th Polish Rifle Regiment;
- 11th Polish Rifle Regiment;
- 12th Polish Rifle Regiment;
- 3rd Artillery Brigade;
- Engineer Company

Uhlan Division (spring 1918)

- 1st Uhlan Regiment (created on 15 September 1917)
- 2nd Uhlan Regiment (created on 20 November 1917)
- 3rd Uhlan Regiment (created on 14 November 1917)
- 1st Horse Artillery Battalion (3 mounted batteries);
- Mounted Engineer Squadron

== See also ==
- 4th Rifle Division (Poland)
- 5th Rifle Division (Poland)
- Polish Legions in World War I
- Polish II Corps in Russia (formed in Bessarabia) and Polish III Corps in Russia (formed in Ukraine)
- Blue Army (Poland)
- Battle of Bobruysk (1918)
