= 2nd Brigade, Polish Legions =

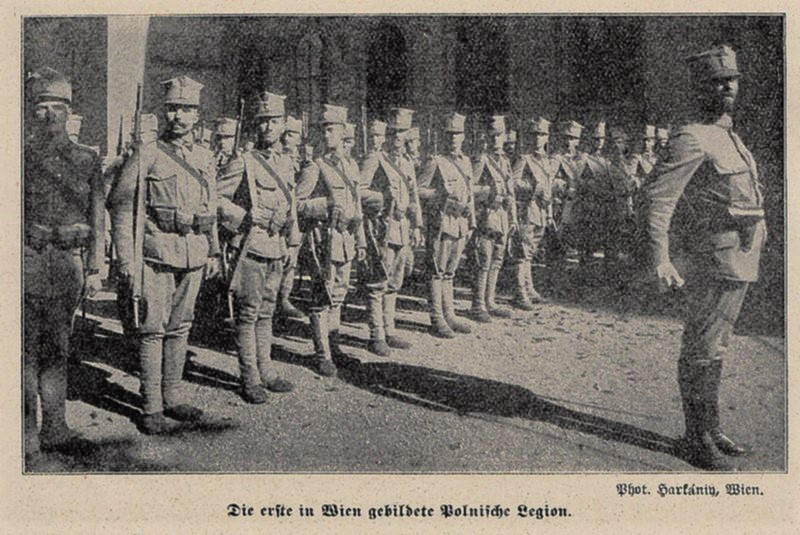
The first Polish Legion formed in Vienna in 1914(Die erste in Wien gebildete Polnische Legion){2nd Brigade Polish}

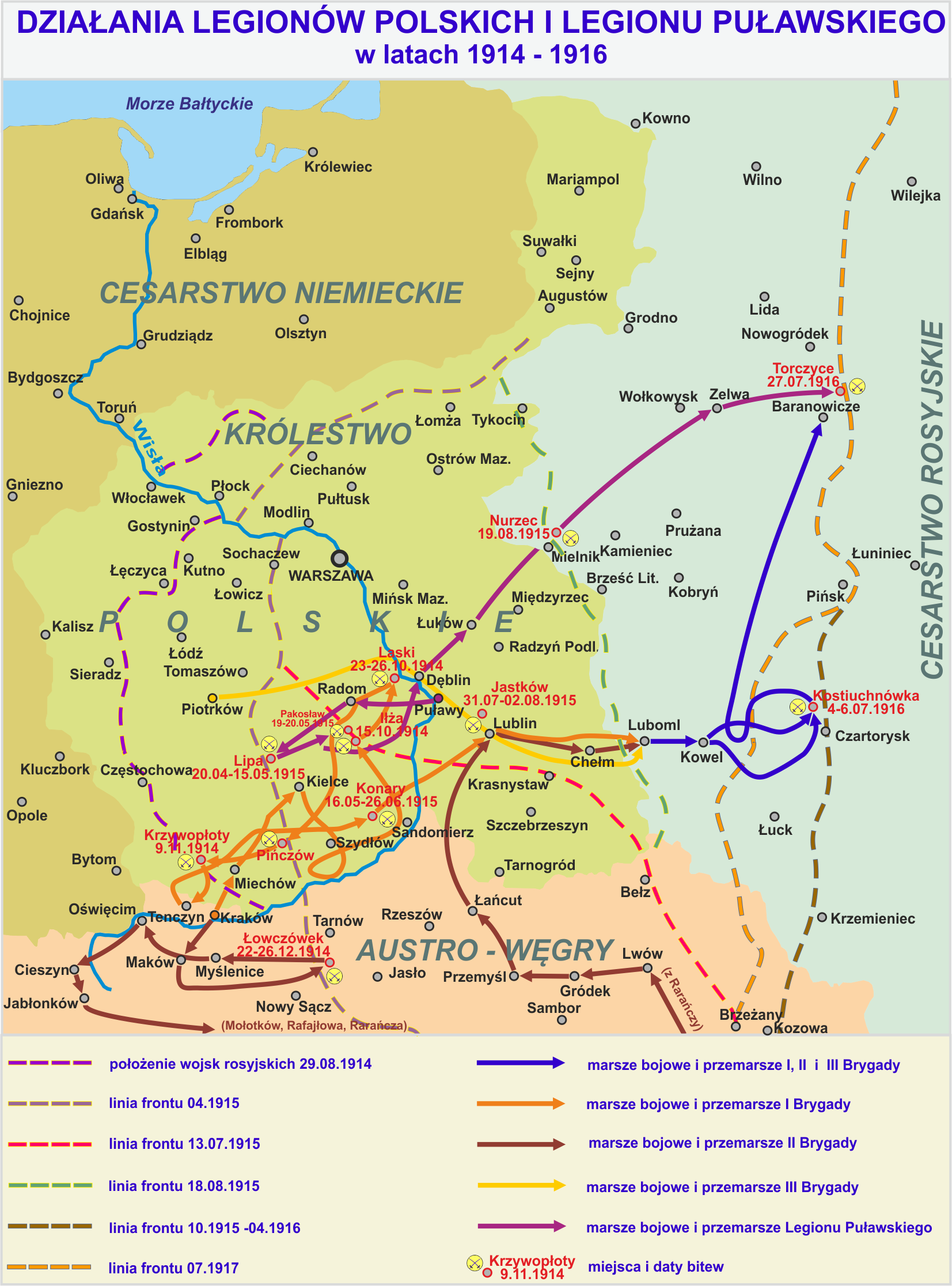
Operations of the Polish Legions

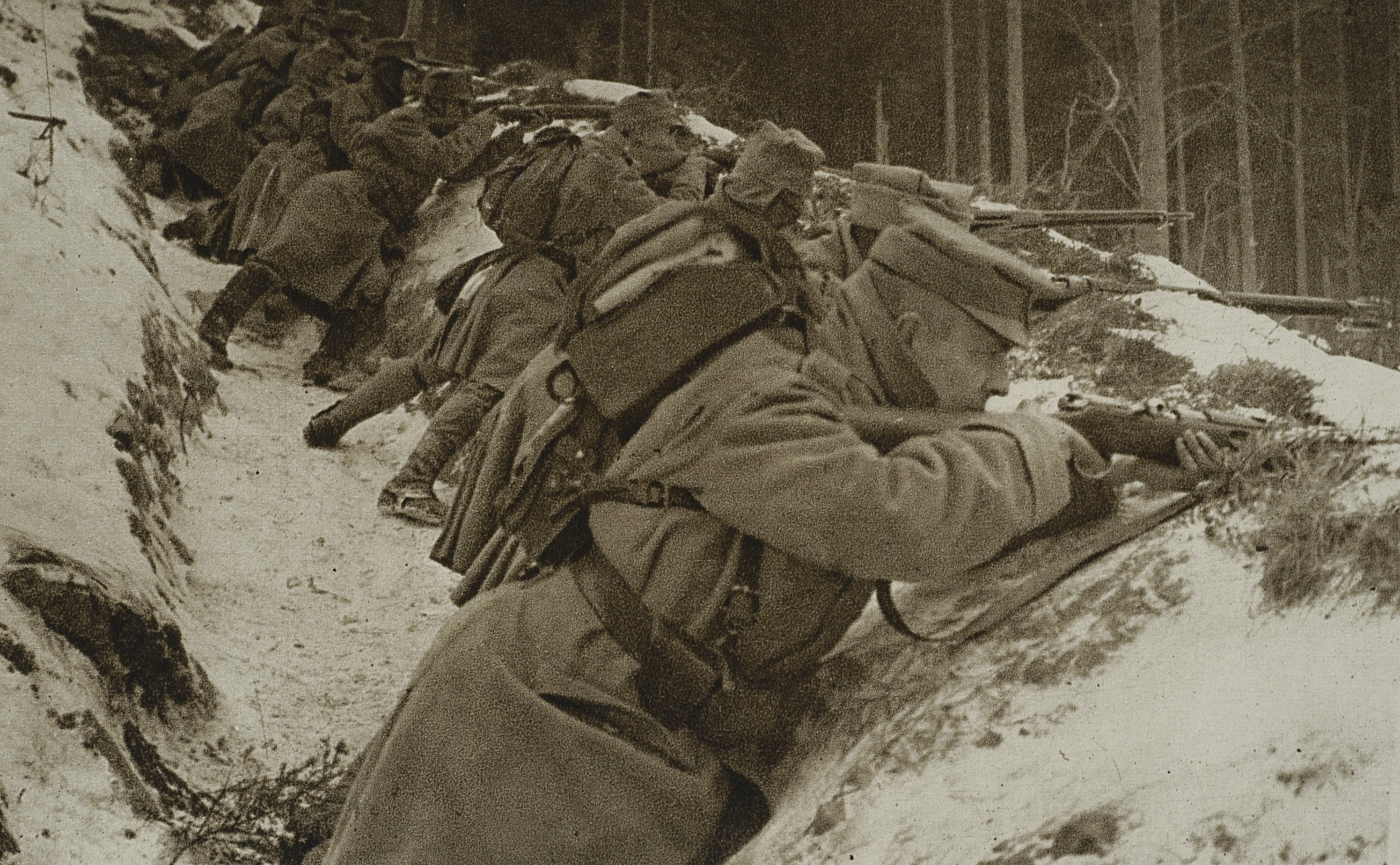
Soldiers of Brigade II, 1915

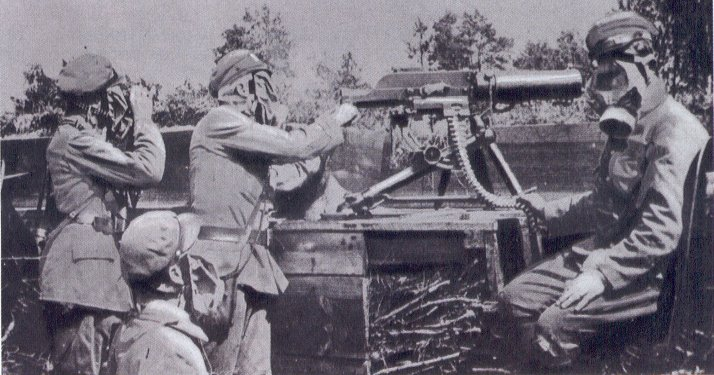
Soldiers of Brigade II in Volhynia, 1915 or 1916

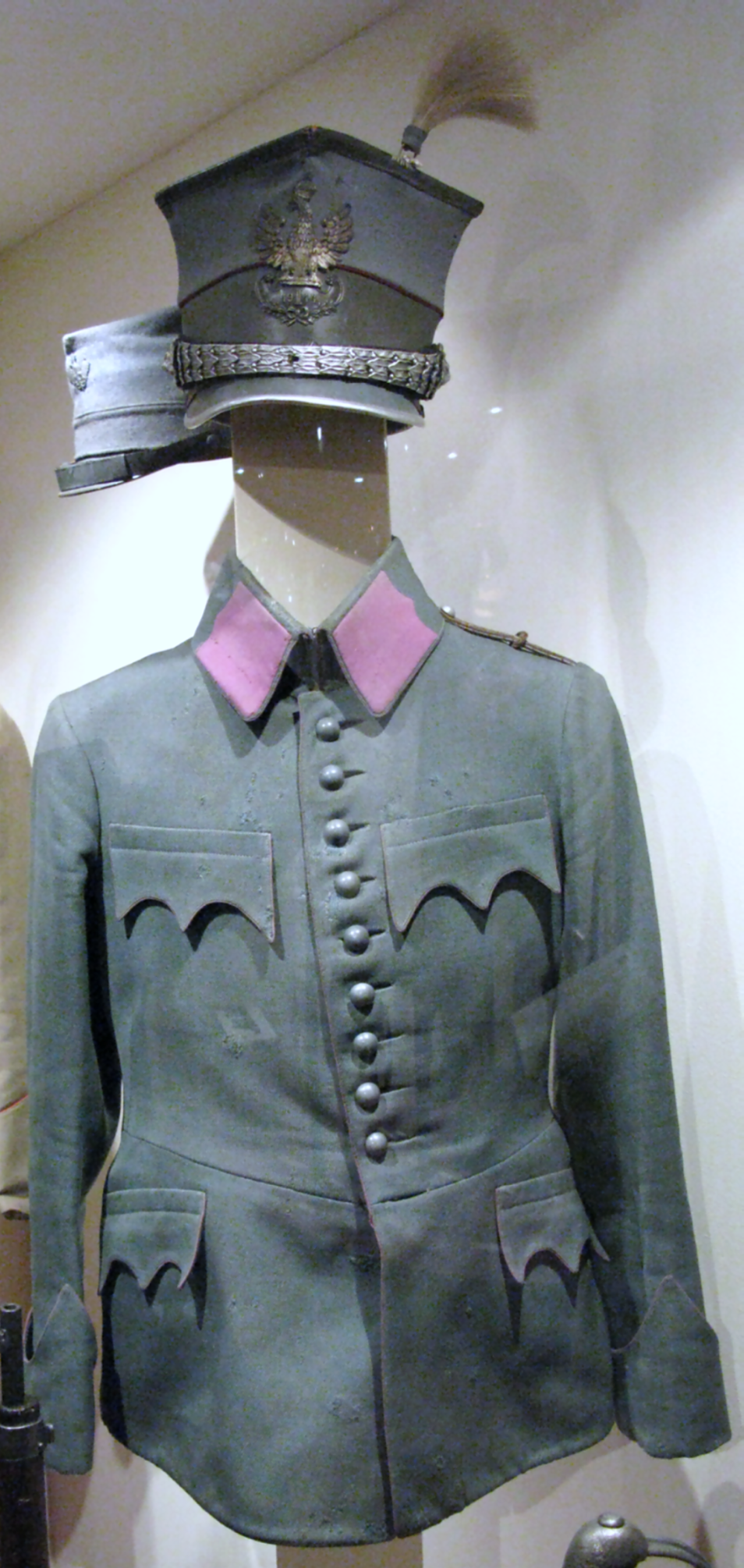
Uniform of 2nd Uhlan Regiment of Polish Legions (1914-1918)

Brigade II of the Polish Legions (Polish: II Brygada Legionów Polskich, Austrian German: Brigade II der Polnischen Legion, Hungarian: A Lengyel Légió II. Dandárja), also known as the Iron (Żelazna, Eisen, Vas) or Carpathian (Karpacka, Karpaten, Kárpát) Brigade, a unit of Austro-Hungarian Army, manned by Austrian Poles, part of the Polish Legions in World War I, that existed from 1914 or 1915 till 1918.

== History ==
The unit was formed in mid-December 1914 (or March 1915, sources vary), as part of the Polish Legions in World War I. The Brigade was first commanded by an Austrian officer, Ferdynand Küttner, and from 14 July 1916 by a Polish officer, Józef Haller de Hallenburg.

In 1917 most of the Brigade followed Haller and unlike the I Brigade and III Brigade, which followed Józef Piłsudski, it swore an oath during the Oath crisis. It eventually formed the bulk of the Polish Auxiliary Corps (although several sources indicated it remained a distinct unit, under the name of the Second Brigade, till March 1918).

After the Treaty of Brest-Litovsk, the Brigade rebelled against the Austro-Hungarians, joining other Polish units and fighting for the cause of Polish independence. In March 1918 the Brigade was combined with the Polish II Corps in Russia (of the former Russian Army, now also rebelling against the Russians).

It was the only First World War Polish formation that fought against all three partitioners of Poland (Austria, Germany and Russia).

=== Battles ===
Major battles fought by the Second Brigade included:

- Battle of Mołotków (29 October 1914)
- Battle of Rafajlowa (23/24 January 1915)
- Charge of Rokitna (13 June 1915)
- Battle of Kostiuchnówka (4 to 6 July 1916)
- Battle of Rarańcza (15/16 February, 1918)
- Battle of Kaniów (11 May 1918)

== Organization ==
The Second Brigade comprised 3 infantry regiments (the 2nd, 3rd and, before it was moved to the III Brigade, 4th), a cavalry regiment (the 2nd), as well as support units (ex. an artillery battalion).
