= Battle of Kaniów =

1918 Eastern Front battle of World War I

- Part of the Eastern Front (World War I)
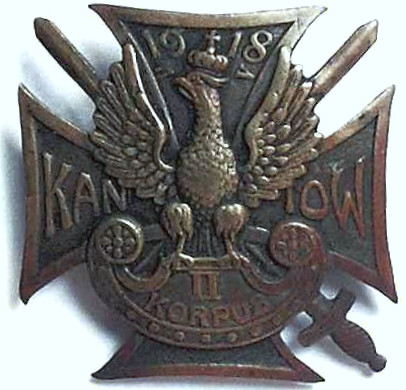
- Commemorative brass award awarded to Polish soldiers years after the battle. Text reads: "1918 - Kaniów - II Korpus".
Date	10–11 May 1918
Location	Near Kaniv (Kaniów)
Result	German victory

Belligerents
(Poland) Polish II Corps in Russia	German Empire

Commanders and leaders
(Poland) Józef Haller	(German Empire) Franz Hermann Zierold

Units involved
Polish II Corps	Unknown

Strength
8,000	12,000

Casualties and losses
1,000 dead or wounded, 3,250 captured	1,500 dead or wounded

Battle of Kaniv, or Battle of Kaniów took place during World War I on the night of 10–11 May 1918, near Kaniv, Ukraine (Ukrainian: Канів, Polish: Kaniów) between Polish and German army troops. The fighting pitted the Polish II Corps in Russia (including Brigade II of the Polish Legions), under General Józef Haller von Hallenburg, against the German Imperial Army (including the 28th Landwehr Brigade), under General Franz Hermann Zierold. Ultimately the Germans were victorious with about half of the Polish forces surrendering and the rest retreating in disarray.

== Background ==
On 15 February, protesting against the Treaty of Brest-Litovsk which reduced the chances for the creation of an independent Poland, the II Brigade of the Polish Legions, formerly part of the Austro-Hungarian Army, broke through the frontline near Rarańcza and merged with the Polish units formerly in the Russian Army, joining the newly formed Polish II Corps in Russia. The Germans, however, saw the II Corps as troublesome, and decided to ensure it would be disarmed, or would otherwise be incapacitated.

On 18 April the II Corps was ordered by the Regency Council to stop near Kaniv in Ukraine; in a triangle between Potik, Kozyn and Stepantsi. Soon it began to be surrounded by nearby German units. On 6 May the commander of the 28th German Landwehr Brigade, General Zierold, subordinate of Marshal Hermann von Eichhorn, issued an ultimatum to the II Corps, demanding it lay down its arms and surrender. II Corps readied for battle and surprised Zierold, who was unprepared for battle. Zierold backed down saying that the ultimatum was a miscommunication. Soon however Zierold received reinforcements, which convinced him he had enough strength to force the issue. German army in the battle was reinforced by several Ukrainian haydamak regiments.

== Battle ==
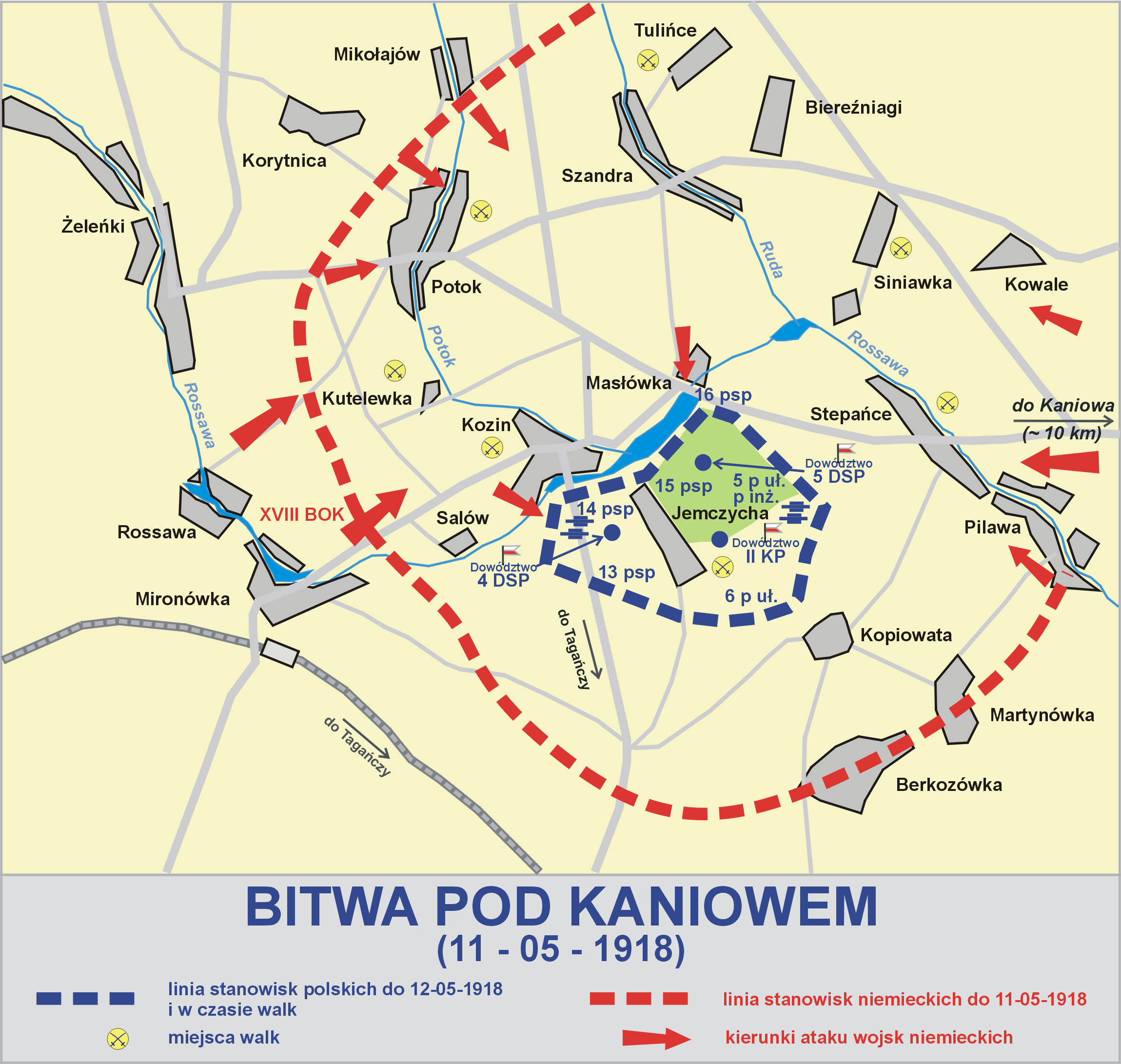
Map of the battle

On the night of the tenth of May to the eleventh of May 1918, II Corps was surrounded and attacked by German units. Polish units, initially surprised, formed on the village of Yemchykha and took defensive positions. The II Corps resisted for about a day, and both sides sustained heavy losses. By the evening of 11 May the Germans, who did not expect the Poles to put such stiff resistance, proposed a ceasefire and negotiations. With supplies running low the Poles accepted the offer to negotiate, and eventually agreed to an honorable capitulation.

== Aftermath ==
The battle resulted in heavy losses for the Germans, estimated at 1,500 dead and 273 wounded. Polish losses are estimated to be much smaller, at about few dozen killed and about 150 wounded. Half of the Polish survivors were arrested and sent to prisoner of war camps (number of prisoners is estimated at 3,250; another estimate suggests 4,000 imprisoned, and 1,500-2,000 who escaped), but the others managed to escape. Those who escaped included the Polish commander Józef Haller de Hallenburg, who faked his death in the battle, and fled to France where he was later appointed commander of the new Polish unit, the Blue Army (or Haller's Army). In the Second Polish Republic, several units would adopt the name "of Kaniów" in honor of that battle: the 28th, 29th, 30th and 31st Infantry Regiments (of Kaniów Rifleman, Polish: Pułki Strzelców Kaniowskich) and 6th Uhlan Kaniów Regiment (6 Pułk Ułanów Kaniowskich).
