= 2nd Polish Corps in Russia =

The 2nd Polish Corps in Russia (Polish: II Korpus Polski w Rosji; Russian: 2-й Польский корпус (Российская империя)) was a Polish military formation formed in revolutionary Russia in 1917.

== History ==
The Corps was formed at the initiative of the Chief Polish Military Committee (Naczelny Polski Komitet Wojskowy), a Polish faction in the revolutionary and split Russian Empire military. It was formed on 21 December 1917 in Soroca (now in Moldova), then a Bessarabian region disputed by revolutionary Ukraine and Romania. The corps was formed primarily from Poles serving in the former Imperial Russian Army. It was a counterpart to the Polish I Corps in Russia formed in the north, in Belarus and the Polish III Corps in Russia in central Ukraine.

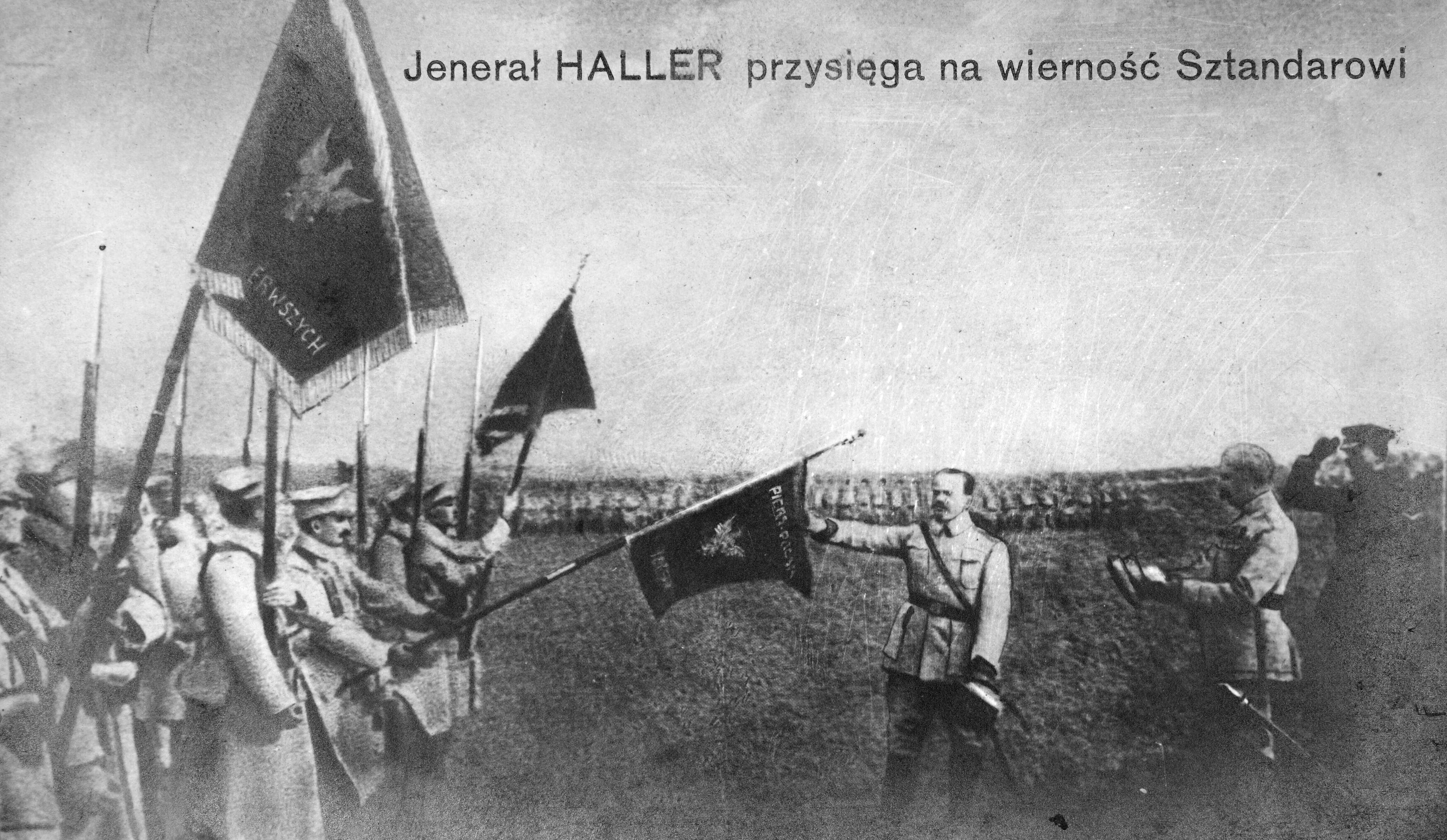
General Józef Haller, touching flag

It was commanded initially by General Sylwester Stankiewicz (some sources also indicate it was briefly commanded by General Władysław Glass). In February 1918 the corps merged with the Brigade II of the Polish Legions and by late March Stankiewicz (and/or Glass) was replaced by the brigade commander, General Józef Haller.

The Corps avoided major engagements, and concentrated on protecting the Polish inhabitants of the region.

In March 1918 the corps had about 8,000 soldiers, and was equipped with weapons passed down from the Russian 29th Corps. At that time, the Treaty of Brest-Litovsk was signed between Russia and the Central Powers. The Germans demanded that the Polish forces surrender.

=== Combat ===
The Poles refused to lay down their arms and General Haller took control of the forces which were then challenged by the Austrians at the battle of Rarańcza (15-16 February 1918). The Poles won the battle and broke through the frontlines to the Ukrainian side. Later, however, they were attacked by German forces. This time the engagement ended in defeat at the battle of Kaniów (10-11 May).

The corps was disbanded afterwards, with most of its soldiers imprisoned by the Germans. General Haller avoided capture and made his way to France. Some soldiers who also avoided capture (mostly from the 4th Rifle Division), moved toward Odessa.

== Organization ==
The corps was considered part of the Blue Army and was composed of two divisions:

- 4th Rifle Division
- 5th Rifle Division

The corps also had supporting units (two cavalry regiments, artillery, engineer and others).

== See also ==
- Polish I Corps in Russia
