= Battle of Sieliszcze =

Battle part of the Polish-Soviet War

- Part of Polish–Soviet War
Date	13 – 14 November 1919
Location	Sieliszcze
Result	Polish victory

Belligerents
Second Polish Republic	Russian SFSR

Commanders and leaders
Lieutenant Władysław Kasza	Unknown

Units involved
2nd Legions Infantry Division (Poland); 4th Legions' Infantry Regiment	ACz divisions

Casualties and losses
2 killed 2 wounded	40 POWs; 2 light guns 2 heavy guns 2 heavy machine guns

`

The Battle of Sieliszcze was fought on 13 November 1919 – 14 November 1919 in the Polish–Soviet War, involving the Polish State against the RSFSR. It resulted in a Polish victory.

== Prelude ==
The aftermath of the Russian Civil War (February Revolution and October Revolution) and World War I, Vladimir Lenin's Russian Soviet Federative Socialist Republic (Russian SFSR) sought to expand their ideology and influence by invading westwards. The result of this was the Soviet westward offensive of 1918–1919 on 18 November 1918, which involved the newly made Second Polish Republic. This offensive ended in February/March 1919 and turned out to be a Soviet victory in Eastern Belorussia but a Soviet defeat in the Baltic states.

The Soviet westward offensive of 1918–1919's end marked the start of the Polish–Soviet War in February 1919 (Battle of Bereza Kartuska).

In the second half of July 1919 the institution of the Polish Armed Forces finished its work on a plan for a large-scale offensive, the aim of which was to capture Minsk, Barysaw, Babruysk and putting the Polish front on the line of the Daugava and Berezina river.

In the operational order of the Lithuanian-Belarusian front of 3 August 1919, it was predicted that the offensive on Minsk would be secured on the left wing by the 1st Legions Infantry Division in the region of Maladzyechna and Vilyeyka while on the right wing by gen. Józef Adam Lasocki's group. The 2nd Legions Infantry Division was to make an offensive on the city from the north-west and then secure Minsk from the direction of Barysaw.

After capturing Minsk during Operation Minsk, the 2nd Legions Infantry Division continued its offensive towards Barysaw and on 18 August it took over the city. It also captured the surrounding foothold on the eastern bank of Berezina, which created the basis for intelligence to be gained from the Red Army.

== Operations ==
In the summer of 1919 the 4th Legions' Infantry Regiment commanded by Mieczysław Smorawiński occupied a 34-kilometre defense section on the Berezina river. On 10 November 1919 it was detected that larger Soviet forces strengthened by artillery were present in Sieliszcze and Tajlanka. The enemy (Red Army) feeling safe behind the front, did not ask for reinforcements.

On 13 November 1919, mjr. Erwin Więckowski acting as the commander of the 4th Legions' Infantry Regiment instead of Mieczysław Smorawiński, ordered the commander (Władysław Kasza of the 3rd battalion to organise an expedition "for cannons". Soldiers of the 9th, 11th, and 12th companies were to take part in the expedition. In total, the group was to consist of 214 soldiers and five heavy machine guns. The 10th company and the 3rd heavy machine gun company remained in defensive positions.

Lieutenant Władysław Kasza started operations on Sieliszcze at midnight, protecting himself with the patrol of the 11th company. Marching through the forests, he approached the town from the south-east. Here he divided the battalion into two parts. Two platoons under the command of Zdzisław Rosołowski were directed to Tajlanka, where the presence of a heavy artillery semi-battery was detected, while the remaining platoons under the command of Witold Rosołowski attacked Sieliszcze.

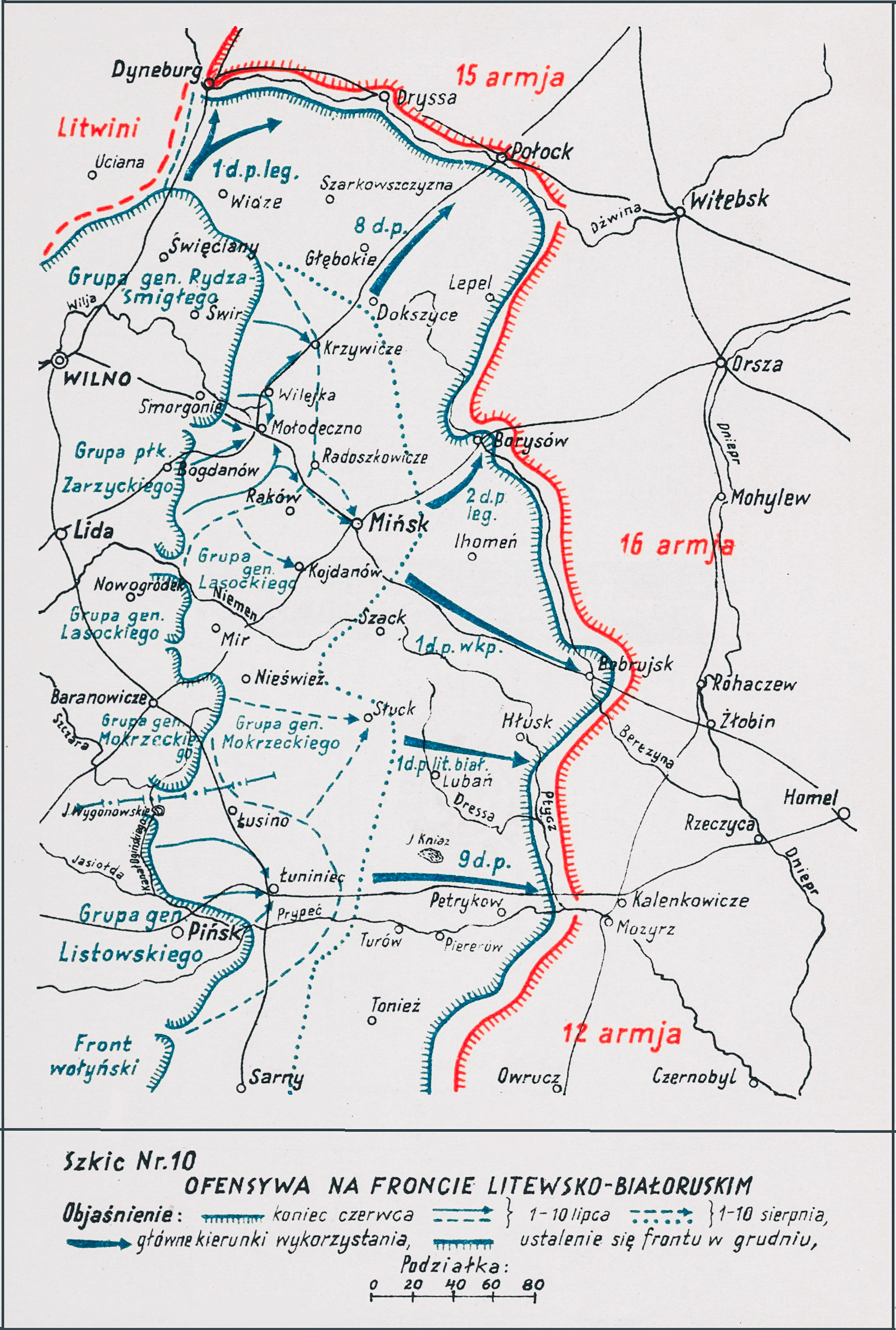
Adam Przybylski, Wojna Polska 1918-1921

Acting out of surprise, the forces of the group captured the town. Two separate platoons captured Tajlanka, where two heavy guns were captured without a fight. At dawn, the commander of the battalion (Władysław Kasza) ordered a retreat. The battalion had to repel Soviet cavalry attacks. Near the village of Miotcza, the battalion's front was stopped by Soviet machine gun fire. Captured cannons were used to fight the Red Army and were operated by captured Soviet cannoneers supervised by Poles. Accurate cannon fire forced the enemy (Red Army) to leave the village and opened the way for the Polish battalion's retreat.

For their exemplary performance of attack and defense, the battalion received a congratulatory message from the fronts commander and a commendation from the commander of the 2nd Legions Infantry Division.

"To the brave 4th Legions' Infantry Regiment and its commander, Lieutenant Kasza, I express my full appreciation for their raid on the village of Miotcza, which resulted in the capture of a Bolshevik battery. The following officers deserve special mentions for their personal bravery in the difficult conditions of this raid: Smidowicz, Witold Rosołowski, Zdzisław Rosołowski, Łopuszański and Kaniowski, non-commissioned officers: Grzybowski, Bytomski, Kuźnicki, Bijowski, Stankiewicz, Brajtling, Zadrożny, Janicki and Wiśniowski, legionnaires: Ogórek, Płóciennik, Wiejak, Pietrzak, Kutrzeba, Wolski, Gurgoń, Sobański, Adamczyk, Gołębiowski, Lewandowski, Kopiński, Sujnoraj and many others." - Colonel Minkiewicz

== Losses ==
During the raid on Sieliszcze, two Poles were killed and two Poles were wounded. As for the Soviets, forty prisoners of war were taken, two light guns, two heavy guns and two heavy machine guns were captured.

== General sources ==
- Adam Lewicki: Zarys historii wojennej 4-go pułku piechoty Legionów. Warsaw: Wojskowe Biuro Historyczne, 1929, series: Zarys historii wojennej pułków polskich 1918-1920 [pl].
- Janusz Odziemkowski: Leksykon wojny polsko – rosyjskiej 1919-1920. Warsaw: Oficyna Wydawnicza „Rytm”, 2004. ISBN 83-7399-096-8.
- Janusz Odziemkowski: Leksykon bitew polskich 1914 – 1920. Pruszków: Oficyna Wydawnicza „Ajaks”, 1998. ISBN 83-85621-46-6.
- Janusz Odziemkowski: Piechota polska w wojnie z Rosją bolszewicką 1919-1920. Warsaw: Oficyna Wydawnicza „Adam”, 2010. ISBN 978-83-7072-650-8.
- Adam Przybylski: Wojna polska 1918-1921. Warsaw: Wojskowy Instytut Naukowo-Wydawniczy, 1930.
- Juliusz S. Tym: Działania na Froncie Litewsko-Białoruskim (June 1919 – April 1920). Szczecin: Institute of National Remembrance, 2020.
- Lech Wyszczelski: Wojna o polskie kresy 1918-1921. Warsaw: Wydawnictwo Bellona SA, 2011. ISBN 978-83-11-12866-8.
- Józef Sitko: Zarys historii wojennej 2-go pułku piechoty Legionów. Warsaw: Wojskowe Biuro Historyczne, 1928, series: Zarys historii wojennej pułków polskich 1918-1920 [pl].
- Norman Davies: White Eagle, Red Star: The Polish-Soviet War 1919–20 and 'the Miracle on the Vistula'. London: Pimlico, 2003. ISBN 978-0-7126-0694-3.
- Christopher Rice: Lenin: Portrait of a Professional Revolutionary. London: Cassell, 1990. ISBN 978-0-304-31814-8.
