= Kaszás =

Kaszás is a surname. Notable people with the name include:

- Attila Kaszás (1960–2007), Slovak-Hungarian actor
- László Kaszás (born 1938), Hungarian footballer
- Oliver Venndt Kaszas (born 1991), Danish beach volleyball player
- Zoltan Kaszas (born 1987), Hungarian-American comedian and actor

== See also ==
- Kasza
