= Battle of Lida (1919) =

Coordinates: 53°53′N 25°18′E

- Part of Polish–Soviet War
| Date | 16th – 17th April 1919 |
| Location | Lida, part of modern Belarus |
| Result | Polish victory |

Belligerents
| Poland | Russian SFSR |

Commanders and leaders
| Józef Lasocki | Franciszek Rupniewicz I. Kukujew |

Strength
| 7 infantry battalions, 4 artillery batteries, 2 and a half squadrons of cavalry | 3 Rewolucyjny Pułk Siedlecki, 6 Rewolucyjny Pułk Grodzieński, 1 armored train |

Casualties and losses
| At least 38 killed and 174 wounded | More than 350 POWs, 1 armored train lost |

The Battle of Lida took place on 16 and 17 April 1919 around the city of Lida during the Polish–Soviet War of 1919–20. During World War I Lida was occupied by the German troops. In 1919 the Red Army briefly established Soviet power here.

Polish troops under General Józef Adam Lasocki reached the outskirts of the town, which was an important railroad junction, in early March 1919. On April 15 they resumed their advance and on April 17 they captured Lida, as a screening operation to the taking of Vilnius, which was the main target of Polish operation.

== Background ==
In early 1919, the situation on the Polish–Ukrainian front stabilized (see Polish–Ukrainian War). Further to the north, Polish – Soviet frontline went along the line Brest – Pinsk – Baranavichy – Skidzyelʹ. Southern sector of the Polish – Soviet frontline (near Byaroza), was protected by the so-called Podlasie Group of the Polish Army concentrated, under General Antoni Listowski, while in the north (around Vawkavysk), stationed the 1st Lithuanian–Belarusian Division, commanded by General Wacław Iwaszkiewicz-Rudoszański. In early March 1919, Polish forces initiated a series of local offensives: on March 2, Poles captured Slonim, three days later Pinsk, and their units reached Lida.

In April 1919, Headquarters of the Polish Army had to make a strategic decision: whether to continue fighting the Ukrainians in Eastern Galicia and Volhynia, or to move bulk of the forces to Polesia and Belarus, and face the Soviets. Józef Piłsudski chose the latter option, probably for personal reasons, as he was emotionally attached with the city of Vilnius.

In early April 1919, Polish units concentrated along the line of the Yaselda River and the Oginski Canal. Soviet forces controlled the towns of Vilnius, Lida, Baranavichy and Luninets, while German units of the Ober Ost remained east of Grodno.

The area of Lida was guarded by weak Soviet forces, and Polish troops took advantage of it, capturing Eišiškės, located between Lida and Varėna. Following the order of Polish Headquarters, both Vilnius and Lida were to be captured in a simultaneous operation. Forces, sent to Lida under General Józef Lasocki, consisted of the following units:

- 1st Battalion of 2nd Legions' Infantry Regiment (Captain Emil Czaplinski),
- 1st Battalion of 3rd Legions' Infantry Regiment (Captain Waclaw Zborowski),
- 3rd Battalion of 4th Legions' Infantry Regiment (Captain Stefan Jazdzynski),
- a battery of field artillery and two batteries of heavy artillery,
- two infantry battalions of 41st Suwałki Infantry Regiment,
- cavalry group of Major Gluchowski.

== The battle ==
On April 16, 1919, at 5 a.m., Polish forces attacked the town from three sides – north, west and south. At the same time, Polish cavalry headed eastwards, to cut rail connection between Lida and Maladzyechna. Bolshevik forces in the town, supported by the Jewish residents, put up a strong resistance. Since the battle ensued for much longer that Józef Piłsudski had predicted, additional Polish forces were sent by trains: 2nd Battalion of 5th Legions Infantry Regiment (Captain Bernard Mond), and 1st Battalion of 6th Legions Infantry Regiment (Major Stefan Dąb-Biernacki).

Heavy fighting lasted for the whole night of April 16/17, with several soldiers killed and wounded on both sides. The Bolsheviks called an armoured train, which managed to halt Polish advance for some time. Polish soldiers finally managed to cross the railroad track, and entered the suburbs of Lida. During a bloody street fighting, Poles had to capture one house at a time, but after reinforcements had been brought in, they destroyed railroad track with hand grenades.

On April 17, at 4 in the morning, general Polish assault began, with main forces concentrated in the direction of the rail station. After one hour of heavy fighting, Lida was captured. The Poles captured a Bolshevik armoured train, weapons, ammunition and 350 prisoners of war. The Bolsheviks retreated eastwards, chased by Polish cavalry of the 7th Lublin Uhlan Regiment under Major Janusz Głuchowski.

Polish engineers immediately began working on the destroyed rail track, to enable troop transports to Vilnius. At noon on April 17, Józef Piłsudski came to Lida.

The Battle of Lida was commemorated on Warsaw Tomb of Unknown Soldier, with the inscription "LIDA 16 IV 1918 – 28 IX 1920".
