= Gediminas Castle =

Gediminas Castle is the name applied to:

- Gediminas Tower in Vilnius, Lithuania
- Lida Castle in Lida, Belarus
