= Kasza =

Kasza may refer to:

== People ==
- Alexander Kasza (1896–1945), Austro-Hungarian World War I flying ace
- Dániel Kasza (born 1994), Hungarian footballer
- József Kasza (1945–2016), Serbian-Hungarian politician, economist, and banker
- Keiko Kasza (born 1951), Japanese-American author and illustrator
- Róbert Kasza (born 1986), Hungarian modern pentathlete
- Władysław Kasza (1895–1937), Lieutenant colonel of the Polish Army, independence activist

== Food ==
- Kasza, a generic Polish term for groats, closely related to words in other Slavic languages
  - Kasha, an English word borrowed from Russian or Yiddish that refers to buckwheat groats

== See also ==
- Kaszás
