= 1966–67 UE Lleida season =

UE Lleida
1966–67 season
- Chairman: (Spain) Ramón Vilaltella
- Manager: (Spain) José Seguer (to December) (Spain) Rosendo Hernández (from December)
- Segunda División: 12th
- Copa del Generalísimo: Second Round
- Top goalscorer: League: Juan Cifré (7); All: Juan Cifré (9)

The 1966–67 season was the 28th season in UE Lleida's existence, and their 1st year in Segunda División after 1966 promotion.

== Squad ==
| | Player | Pos | Lge Apps | Lge Gls | Cup Apps | Cup Gls | Tot Apps | Tot Gls | Date signed | Previous club |
Goalkeepers
| (Spain) | Carlos Patiño | GK | 30 | - | 5 | - | 35 | - | 1963 | Plus Ultra |
| (Spain) | Benito Beitia | GK | - | - | - | - | - | - | 1966 | Constància |
Defenders
| (Spain) | Manuel Quevedo Pantaleón | DF | 27 | - | 5 | - | 32 | - | 1965 | Deportivo |
| (Spain) | Luis Navarro | DF | 19 | - | 2 | - | 21 | - | 1966 | Espanyol |
| (Spain) | Jaime Sabaté | DF | 13 | - | 3 | 1 | 16 | 1 | 1966 | Espanyol |
| (Spain) | Rodrigo Durán Rori | DF | 12 | - | 3 | - | 15 | - | 1966 | Celta |
| (Spain) | José María Castellví | DF | 11 | - | 1 | - | 12 | - | 1967 | Borges |
| (Spain) | Antonio Olivares | DF | 7 | - | - | - | 7 | - | 1964 | |
| (Spain) | Enrique García Pey | DF | 3 | 1 | 1 | - | 4 | 1 | 1967 | Espanyol |
| (Spain) | Pérez | DF | 2 | - | - | - | 2 | - | 1967 | Balaguer |
Midfielders
| (Spain) | Juan Forteza | MF | 29 | - | 5 | - | 34 | - | 1966 | Mallorca |
| (Spain) | Juan José Barberà | MF | 20 | 3 | 4 | 1 | 24 | 4 | 1965 | Badalona |
| (Spain) | Ramón Aumedes | MF | 15 | 4 | 1 | - | 16 | 4 | 1966 | Espanyol |
| (Spain) | Francisco Guzmán | MF | 12 | 1 | - | - | 12 | 1 | 1966 | Menorca |
| (Spain) | Miguel Iguaran | MF | 7 | - | 3 | - | 10 | - | 1967 | Mallorca |
| (Spain) | Juan Antonio Rodríguez Juanín | MF | 6 | - | 3 | - | 9 | - | 1963 | |
| (Spain) | Andrés Manceñido | MF | 7 | 2 | 1 | - | 8 | 2 | 1963 | Cartagena |
| (Spain) | José Sánchez Boy | MF | 7 | 1 | 1 | - | 8 | 1 | 1966 | Espanyol |
| (Spain) | Constancio Bermúdez | MF | 5 | 1 | 2 | - | 7 | 1 | 1967 | Ontinyent |
| (Spain) | Eudaldo Jordá | MF | 3 | - | - | - | 3 | - | 1966 | Academy |
Forwards
| (Spain) | Antonio Vallejo | CF | 23 | 5 | 4 | - | 27 | 5 | 1964 | Castellón |
| (Spain) | Antonio Ferrando | CF | 18 | 2 | 4 | - | 22 | 2 | 1966 | Espanyol |
| (Spain) | Diego Torrents | CF | 18 | 2 | 2 | - | 20 | 2 | 1966 | Levante |
| (Hungary) | László Kaszás | CF | 15 | 1 | 1 | 1 | 16 | 2 | 1966 | Espanyol |
| (Spain) | Juan Cifré | CF | 7 | 7 | 3 | 2 | 10 | 9 | 1967 | Mallorca |
| (Spain) | Julio Nogueira Julito | CF | 8 | - | - | - | 8 | - | 1966 | Constància |
| (Spain) | Ginés Castaño | CF | 6 | - | - | - | 6 | - | 1966 | Sabadell |

== Competitions ==
=== Pre-season ===
| 14 August 1966 | Lleida (Spain) | 2 – 1 | (France) Red Star | Lleida |
| | Manceñido 9' (pen.); Barberá (?) | | Jara (?) | Stadium: Camp d'Esports |

| 17 August 1966 | Lleida | 1 – 2 | Zaragoza | Lleida |
| | Barberá 33' | | Marcelino 14'; Bustillo 59' | Stadium: Camp d'Esports; Referee: Mòdol |

| 20 August 1966 | Lleida | 0 – 4 | FC Barcelona | Lleida |
| | | | Zaldúa 26'; Montesinos (?); Vidal (?) | Stadium: Camp d'Esports; Referee: Molina |

=== Copa Presidente ===
| 24 August 1966 | Olot | 4 – 1 | Lleida | Olot |
| | Danés 19'; Salvi 21', 77'; Morchón 43' | | Guzmán 73' | Referee: Gurrea |

| 27 August 1966 | Lleida | 3 – 0 | Balaguer | Lleida |
| | Torrents 4', 57'; Julito 50' | | | Stadium: Camp d'Esports; Referee: Forés |

| 1 September 1966 | Lleida | 4 – 0 | Europa | Lleida |
| | Torrents 8'; Kaszás 55', 65' (pen.); Boy 89' | | | Stadium: Camp d'Esports; Referee: Sierra |

=== League ===
| 11 September 1966 Round 1 | Recreativo | 1 – 0 | Lleida | Huelva |
| | Mauro 47' | | | Stadium: Colombino; Referee: Franco Martínez |

| 18 September 1966 Round 2 | Lleida | 2 – 0 | Badalona | Lleida |
| | Aumedes 4'; Boy 47' | | | Stadium: Camp d'Esports; Referee: Tomás López |

| 25 September 1966 Round 3 | Castellón | 1 – 0 | Lleida | Castellón de la Plana |
| | Paulino 36' | | | Stadium: Castalia; Referee: Peinado Lara |

| 2 October 1966 Round 4 | Lleida | 0 – 0 | Condal | Lleida |
| | | | | Stadium: Camp d'Esports; Referee: Varas Gómez |

| 9 October 1966 Round 5 | Murcia | 3 – 0 | Lleida | Murcia |
| | Abenza 58'; Serafín 62', 87' | | | Stadium: La Condomina; Referee: Medina Díaz |

| 16 October 1966 Round 6 | Lleida | 2 – 1 | Mestalla | Lleida |
| | Aumedes 50'; Guzmán 79' | | Nolito 84' | Stadium: Camp d'Esports; Referee: Ventura Santana |

| 30 October 1966 Round 7 | Betis | 2 – 1 | Lleida | Seville |
| | Landa 25'; Zacarizo 42' | | Vallejo 12' | Stadium: Heliópolis; Referee: Segrelles del Pilar |

| 6 November 1966 Round 8 | Lleida | 2 – 0 | Constància | Lleida |
| | Kaszás 17'; Aumedes 86' | | | Stadium: Camp d'Esports; Referee: Pastrana Zamudio |

| 13 November 1966 Round 9 | Ceuta | 1 – 0 | Lleida | Ceuta |
| | Ginesín 43' | | | Referee: Pérez Quintas |

| 20 November 1966 Round 10 | Málaga | 0 – 0 | Lleida | Málaga |
| | | | | Stadium: La Rosaleda; Referee: Jorge Ramos |

| 27 November 1966 Round 11 | Lleida | 1 – 1 | Europa | Lleida |
| | Vallejo 65' | | Elizondo 2' | Stadium: Camp d'Esports; Referee: Balaguer García |

| 4 December 1966 Round 12 | Cádiz | 2 – 0 | Lleida | Cádiz |
| | Migueli 11', 70' | | | Stadium: Ramón de Carranza; Referee: Franco Martínez |

| 11 December 1966 Round 13 | Lleida | 0 – 2 | Levante | Lleida |
| | | | Wanderley 13', 70' | Stadium: Camp d'Esports; Referee: Carbelo Martín |

| 18 December 1966 Round 14 | Algeciras | 1 – 0 | Lleida | Algeciras |
| | Gerardo 23' | | | Stadium: El Mirador; Referee: David Aguado |

| 1 January 1967 Round 15 | Lleida | 0 – 1 | Mallorca | Lleida |
| | | | Daucik 54' | Stadium: Camp d'Esports; Referee: Cañete Laguna |

| 8 January 1967 Round 16 | Lleida | 1 – 0 | Recreativo | Lleida |
| | Aumedes 35' | | | Stadium: Camp d'Esports; Referee: Valle Hernández |

| 15 January 1967 Round 17 | Badalona | 3 – 1 | Lleida | Badalona |
| | Gasull 62'; Vinacua 63'; Taulats 81' | | Torrents 66' | Stadium: Camp del Centenari; Referee: Ventura Santana |

| 22 January 1967 Round 18 | Lleida | 3 – 0 | Castellón | Lleida |
| | Bermúdez 6'; Torrents 15'; García Pey 26' | | | Stadium: Camp d'Esports; Referee: Balaguer García |

| 5 February 1967 Round 19 | Condal | 3 – 1 | Lleida | Barcelona |
| | Ilundain 14', 84'; Garriga 63' | | Vallejo 64' (pen.) | Stadium: Camp Nou; Referee: David Aguado |

| 12 February 1967 Round 20 | Lleida | 1 – 1 | Murcia | Lleida |
| | Barberá 5' (pen.) | | Serafín 28' | Stadium: Camp d'Esports; Referee: Varas Gómez |

| 18 February 1967 Round 21 | Mestalla | 4 – 1 | Lleida | Valencia |
| | Palau 50' (pen.), 57', 84'; Burgos 72' | | Manceñido 70' | Stadium: Mestalla; Referee: Medina Díaz |

| 26 February 1967 Round 22 | Lleida | 1 – 4 | Betis | Lleida |
| | Manceñido 7' | | Azcárate 20'; Pallarés 34'; Frasco 48'; González 88' | Stadium: Camp d'Esports; Referee: Galende Valladolid |

| 5 March 1967 Round 23 | Constància | 3 – 0 | Lleida | Inca |
| | Colom 3'; Joseíto 49', 61' | | | Referee: Cañete Laguna |

| 12 March 1967 Round 24 | Lleida | 3 – 0 | Ceuta | Lleida |
| | Cifré 5', 30', 65' | | | Stadium: Camp d'Esports; Referee: Segrelles del Pilar |

| 19 March 1967 Round 25 | Lleida | 1 – 1 | Málaga | Lleida |
| | Ferrando 78' | | Benítez 44' | Stadium: Camp d'Esports; Referee: Serrano Sancristóbal |

| 26 March 1967 Round 26 | Europa | 1 – 3 | Lleida | Barcelona |
| | López 44' | | Barberá 28'; Vallejo 49'; Cifré 50' | Stadium: Sardenya; Referee: Pascual Tejerina |

| 2 April 1967 Round 27 | Lleida | 1 – 1 | Cádiz | Lleida |
| | Cifré 2' | | Santiago 67' | Stadium: Camp d'Esports; Referee: Franco Martínez |

| 9 April 1967 Round 28 | Levante | 3 – 3 | Lleida | Valencia |
| | Ballester 26'; Núñez 42'; Wanderley 55' (pen.) | | Barberá 28'; Ferrando 74'; Cifré 78' | Stadium: Vallejo; Referee: Jorge Ramos |

| 16 April 1967 Round 29 | Lleida | 2 – 0 | Algeciras | Lleida |
| | Vallejo 37'; Cifré 75' | | | Stadium: Camp d'Esports; Referee: Segrelles del Pilar |

| 23 April 1967 Round 30 | Mallorca | 0 – 0 | Lleida | Palma de Mallorca |
| | | | | Stadium: Lluís Sitjar; Referee: Franco Martínez |

==== Results by Round ====
| Round | 1 | 2 | 3 | 4 | 5 | 6 | 7 | 8 | 9 | 10 | 11 | 12 | 13 | 14 | 15 | 16 | 17 | 18 | 19 | 20 | 21 | 22 | 23 | 24 | 25 | 26 | 27 | 28 | 29 | 30 |
|---|---|---|---|---|---|---|---|---|---|---|---|---|---|---|---|---|---|---|---|---|---|---|---|---|---|---|---|---|---|---|
| Ground | A | H | A | H | A | H | A | H | A | A | H | A | H | A | H | H | A | H | A | H | A | H | A | H | H | A | H | A | H | A |
| Result | L | W | L | D | L | W | L | W | L | D | D | L | L | L | L | W | L | W | L | D | L | L | L | W | D | W | D | D | W | D |
| Position | 14 | 6 | 12 | 9 | 15 | 13 | 13 | 11 | 13 | 13 | 13 | 13 | 14 | 15 | 15 | 14 | 15 | 14 | 15 | 15 | 15 | 15 | 15 | 15 | 15 | 13 | 13 | 13 | 12 | 12 |

Updated to match(es) played on 19 May. Source: rfef.es
A = Away; H = Home; W = Win; D = Draw; L = Loss

=== Copa del Generalísimo ===
| 23 October 1966 First 1st Leg | Calvo Sotelo | 0 – 1 | Lleida | Puertollano |
| | | | Kaszás 67' | Referee: Serrano |

| 29 January 1967 First 2nd Leg | Lleida | 1 – 1 | Calvo Sotelo | Lleida |
| | Barberá 52' | | Fábregas 20' | Stadium: Camp d'Esports; Referee: Vicedo |

| 30 April 1967 Second 1st Leg | Deportivo | 2 – 2 | Lleida | A Coruña |
| | Pellicer 16'; Ribada (?) | | Cifré 30' (?) | Stadium: Riazor; Referee: Gómez Platas |

| 7 May 1967 Second 2nd Leg | Lleida | 0 – 0 | Deportivo | Lleida |
| | | | | Stadium: Camp d'Esports; Referee: Álvarez Martínez |

| 9 May 1967 Second Replay | Deportivo | 4 – 1 | Lleida | Bilbao |
| | Loureda 22' (90+?); Sertucha 23' (pen.); Domínguez (?) | | Sabaté 86' | Stadium: San Mamés; Referee: Gómez Arribas |

=== Copa Presidente 1967 ===
| 16 May 1967 | Europa | 1 – 2 | Lleida | Barcelona |
| | Litri 70' | | Juanín 13'; Ortega 20' | Stadium: Sardenya; Referee: Ortiga |

| 24 May 1967 | Lleida | 0 – 2 | Nàstic Tarragona | Lleida |
| | | | Sánchez 30'; Echevarría 58' | Stadium: Camp d'Esports; Referee: Mòdol |

| 30 May 1967 | Espanyol | 1 – 0 | Lleida | Barcelona |
| | Martínez 45' | | | Stadium: Sarrià; Referee: Oliva |

| 3 June 1967 | Lleida | 3 – 1 | Europa | Lleida |
| | Vallejo 22', 65'; Bermúdez 70' | | Pérez 44' | Stadium: Camp d'Esports; Referee: Sierra |

| 6 June 1967 | Nàstic Tarragona | 2 – 0 | Lleida | Tarragona |
| | Alcalde 18'; Serer 70' | | | Referee: Bodena |

| 10 June 1967 | Lleida | 4 – 2 | Espanyol | Lleida |
| | Vallejo 15' (pen.), 65'; Rabassa 32'; Cifré 55' | | Carreras 16' (pen.); Cerrada 28' | Stadium: Camp d'Esports; Referee: Mòdol |
