= Lida =

City in Grodno Region, Belarus

Lida Ліда (Belarusian) Лида (Russian)
- City
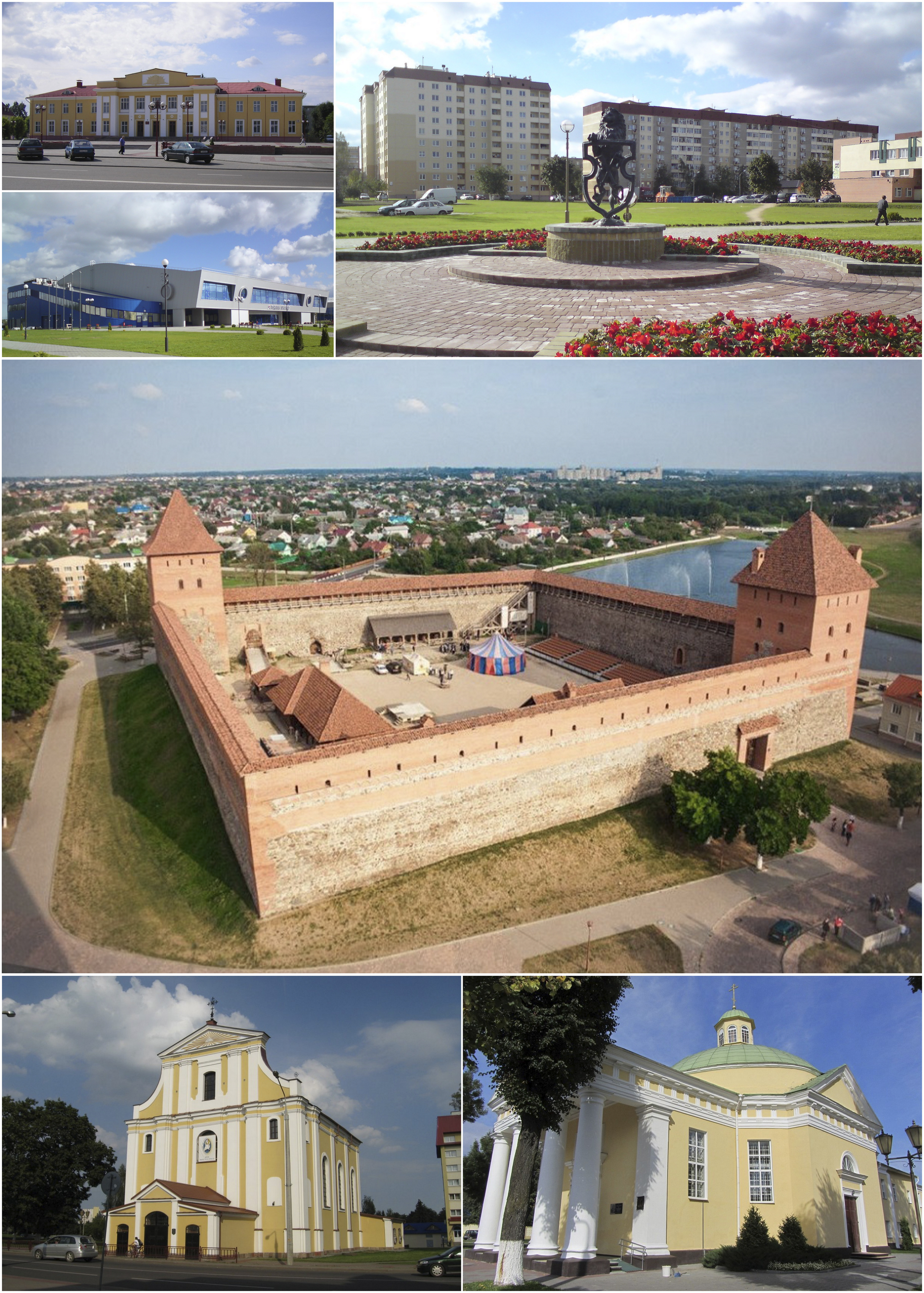

- Flag Coat of arms

- Location within Belarus
- Coordinates: 53°53′44″N 25°17′45″E
- Country: Belarus
- Region: Grodno Region
- District: Lida District
- Founded: 1323

Government
  - Chairman: Mikhail Karpovich

Area
  - Total: 45.8 km^{2} (17.7 sq mi)
- Elevation: 158 m (518 ft)

Population (2025)
  - Total: 103,262
  - Density: 2,250/km^{2} (5,840/sq mi)
- Time zone: UTC+3 (MSK)
- Postal code: 231300
- Area code: +375 154
- License plate: 4
- Website: www.lida.gov.by

Lida (Note: Belarusian: Ліда, IPA: [ˈlʲid̪ä]; Russian: Лида, IPA: [ˈlʲid̪ə]; Lithuanian: Lyda; Latvian: Ļida; Polish: Lida, IPA: [ˈlid̪ä]; Yiddish: לידע, romanized: Lyde.) is a city in Grodno Region, western Belarus, located 168 kilometres (104 mi) west of Minsk. It serves as the administrative center of Lida District. As of 2025, it has a population of 103,262.

== Etymology ==
The name Lida arises from its Lithuanian name Lyda, which derives from lydimas, meaning "slash-and-burn" agricultural method or a plot of land prepared in this way. Names in other languages are spelled as Polish: Lida and Yiddish: לידע.

== History ==
=== Early history ===
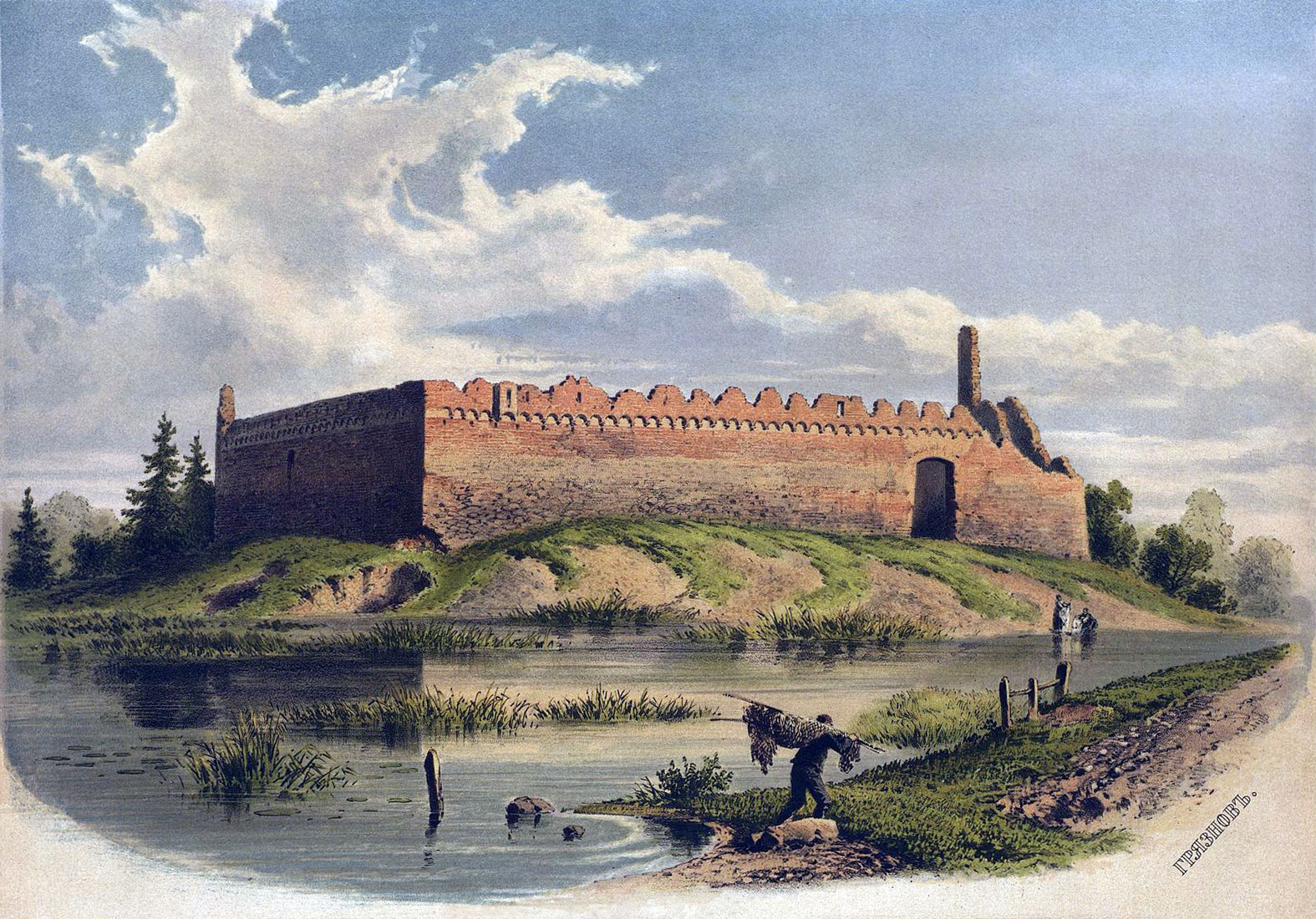
19th-century view of the Lida Castle

There are passing mentions of Lida in chronicles from 1180. Until the early 14th century, the settlement at Lida was a wooden fortress in Lithuania proper. In 1323, the Grand Duke of Lithuania Gediminas built a brick fortress there. The generally considered founding year of Lida is 1380. The fortress withstood Crusader attacks from Prussia in 1392 and 1394 but was burned to the ground in 1710. Following the death of Gediminas, when Lithuania was divided into principalities, Lida became the capital of one of them, the seat of Algirdas. Lida was in the Grand Duchy of Lithuania. After the Union of Krewo (1385), when the Polish–Lithuanian Union was established, and the subsequent Christianization of Lithuania, the Catholic parish was established in the former Lithuanian pagan lands, and a church, whose ruins still exist, was built by King Władysław II Jagiełło, who visited Lida two times, in 1415 and 1422. In the 15th century, the town became a centre of production by craftsmen and trade. Lida was connected with Vilnius, Navahrudak and Minsk. The town had a market square and four streets: Wileńska, Zamkowa, Kamieńska and Krivaya. In 1506, a Sejm was held in Lida, convened by King Aleksander Jagiellon and the Polish-Lithuanian army gathered here before the Battle of Kletsk, in which it defeated the invading Tatars.

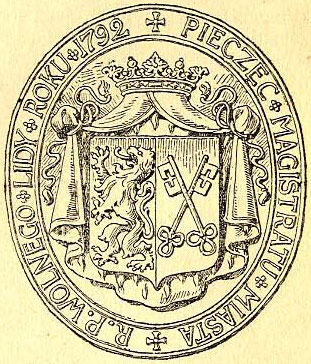
18th-century city seal of Lida

In 1588, Lida became the seat of Lida District in Vilnius Voivodeship. Polish King Sigismund III Vasa granted Lida Magdeburg town rights in 1590, which were later confirmed in Warsaw by Kings Władysław IV Vasa in 1640 and Michael Korybut Wiśniowiecki in 1670 and by the Polish Sejm in 1776. They let Lida hold two annual fairs of little import to the local economy. It was a royal city. The population was between 2000 and 5000 people.

The second half of the 17th century was a difficult time for Lida. During the Russo-Polish War the city was destroyed by the Cossacks in 1655 and the Russians in 1659. As a result of the war in 1656 famine occurred and in 1657 an epidemic. To revive Lida, King Michael Korybut Wiśniowiecki exempted the city from taxes with a privilege of 1676. In 1679 it suffered a fire. In 1702, Lida was plundered by the Swedes.

In 1759, a high school was founded in Lida. By 1786, only 514 inhabitants were left in Lida, in 1792, 1243 people lived here. After the Third Partition of Poland in 1795, it was annexed by the Russian Empire as a powiat centre of the Slonim Governorate (1795).

=== Imperial Russia ===
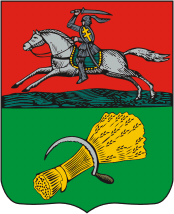
COA of Lida, 1845

Lida was then part of the Lithuania Governorate in 1797 and then Grodno Governorate in 1801.

The town was mostly destroyed during the Napoleonic Wars in 1812. In 1817, the population was 1366 people. In 1831, during the November Uprising, a battle was fought nearby between the Polish insurgents commanded by Dezydery Chłapowski and the Russians. After the uprising, as part of anti-Polish repressions the Piarist church was taken away from Catholics by the Russian administration and transformed into an Orthodox church. It was restored to Catholics after Poland regained independence. In 1842, Lida became the centre of Vilna Governorate. In 1863 and 1873, two beer factories were built in Lida. In 1884, the railway from Vilnius to Lunenets was finished. In 1907, the railway from Molodechno to Mosty was opened. In 1897, the town had 8626 people.

After a two-year school opened, so did a parish school with a department for girls and a Jewish school. In 1899, a hospital opened which consisted of 25 beds. In 1901, a cast-iron plant began to operate. In 1903, a sawmill started operating.

At the end of 19th century and the beginning of 20th century, two brick plants were built. In 1904, there were 1000 houses, of which 275 were brick, 14 small enterprises, four hospitals with beds for 115 patients and six elementary schools for 700 pupils. In 1904, the Russian Social Democratic Party was formed near Minsk. During the revolutions of 1905 to 1907, workers' uprisings took place, complete with political slogans. In 1914, there were almost 40 factories.

=== Interwar Poland ===
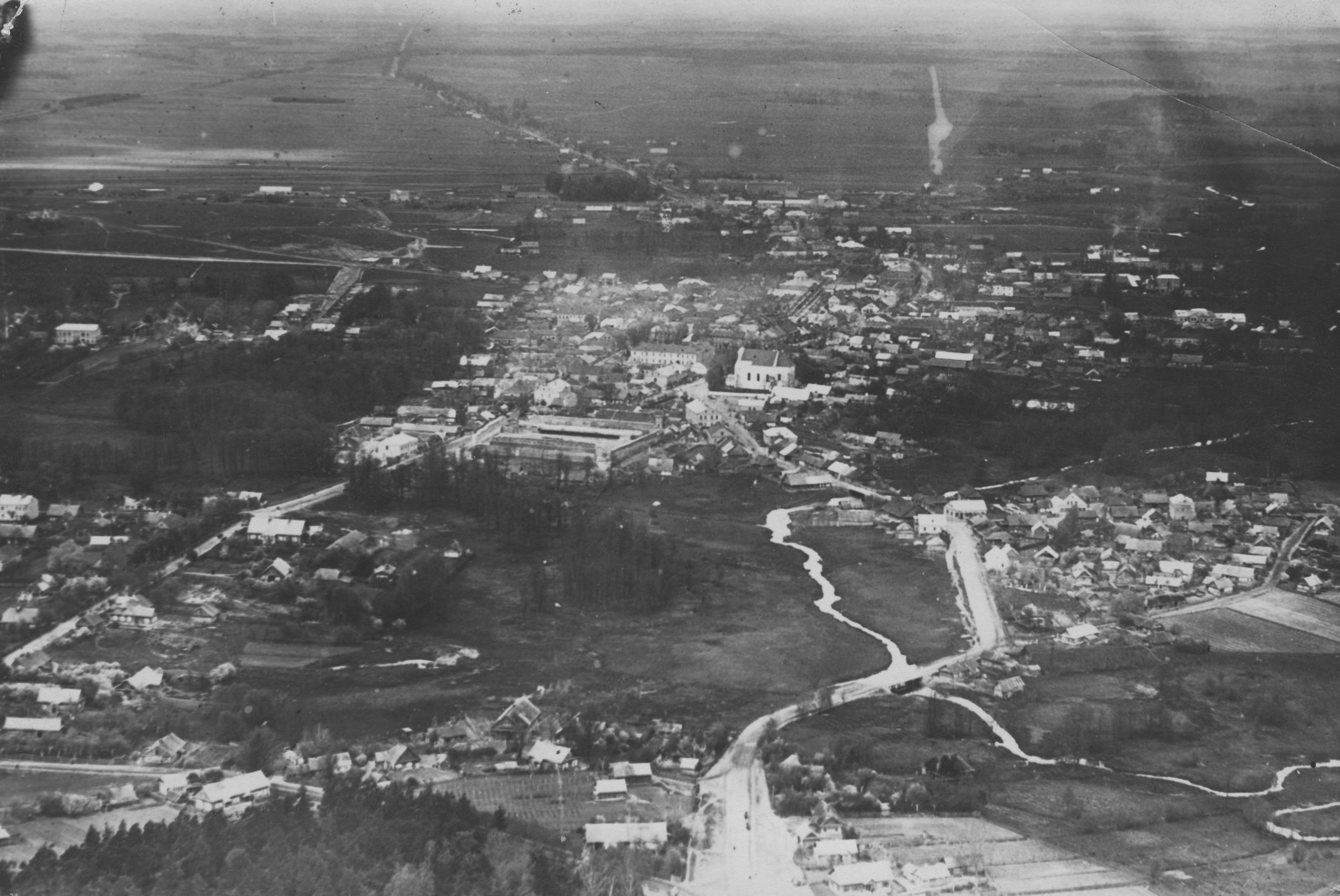
Bird's eye view of Lida in the 1920s

During World War I Lida was occupied by German troops. In 1919, the Red Army established Bolshevik power.

Polish troops, under General Józef Adam Lasocki, reached the outskirts of Lida in early March 1919. On April 15, they resumed their advance, and on April 17 they captured Lida, a screening operation to the taking of Vilnius. On 17 July 1920, the Red Army returned, but it was forced to retreat in August after their defeat at Warsaw.

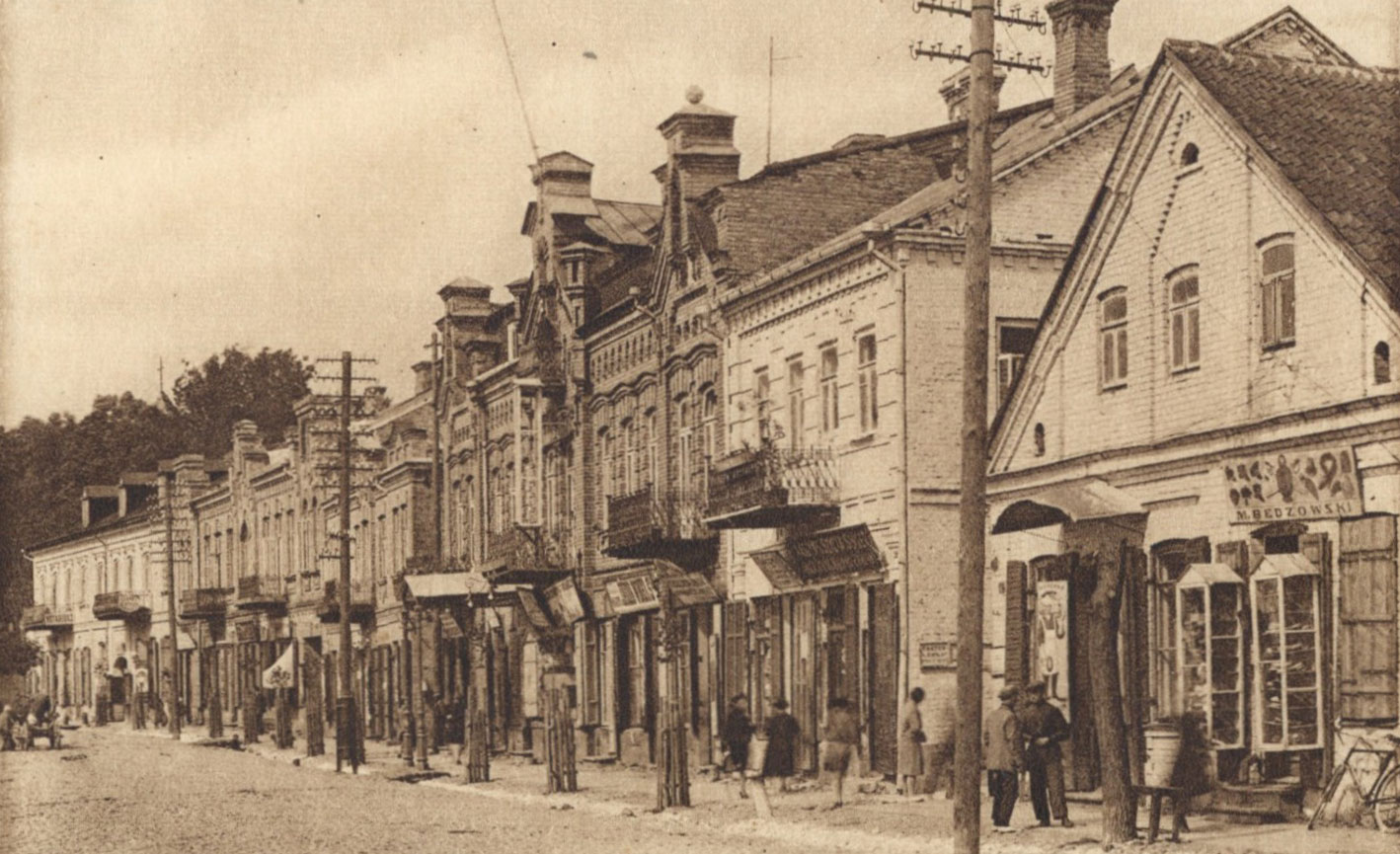
Wileńska Street in pre-war Poland

On 30 September 1920, Polish and Russian troops fought in and around Lida during the Battle of the Niemen River, as the Soviet 21st Rifle Division tried to assault Polish positions but was repulsed by the 1st Lithuanian-Belarusian Division. The Poles took about 10,000 prisoners from the Soviet 3rd Army.

By the Soviet-Lithuanian Treaty of 1920, Lida was ceded by the Soviets to Lithuania, but the treaty was not recognized by Poland. In accordance with 1921 Riga Peace Treaty, the town was awarded to Poland and was a powiat centre in the Nowogródek Voivodeship. According to the 1921 Polish census, the population was 65.8% Polish, 32.4% Jewish and 0.98% Belarusian.

In 1927 were 24 factories in Lida, whose production grew rapidly in 1928. A new rubber goods factory started, employing almost 800 people. Lida was also an important garrison of the Polish Army, with one infantry division and the 5th Corps of the Polish Air Force stationed there. In the 1930s, Lida was extensively expanded, dozens of new streets were built.

=== World War II ===
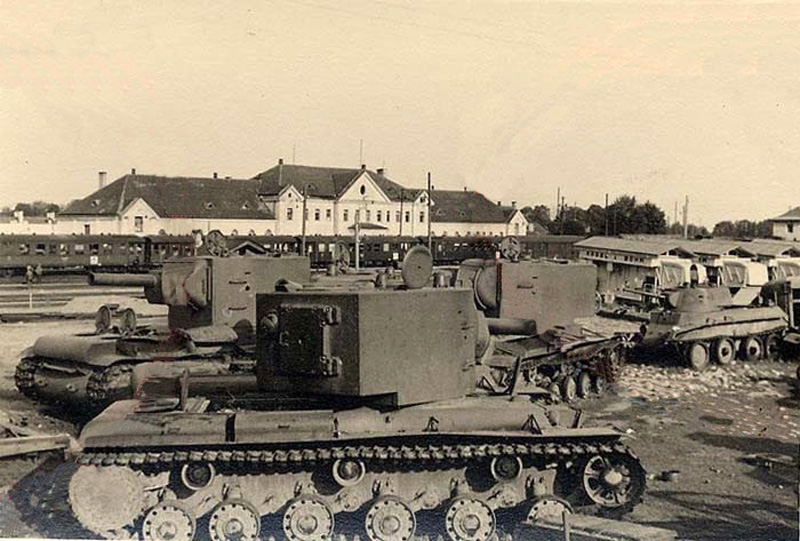
Lida during the occupation of Poland

In 1939, after the Soviet invasion of Poland, Lida became part of the Byelorussian Soviet Socialist Republic. In January 1940, Lida became the centre of Lida Raion, in Baranavichy Region. From June 1941 to July 1944, it was occupied by German troops, who killed almost 25,149 people. On September 18, 1943, the Jewish Community of Lida was rounded up and taken to Majdanek, where they were murdered. Only about 200 Lida Jews survived the Holocaust. From mid-1944 Lida was occupied by the Soviets again. After the war, in 1945, in accordance to the Potsdam Agreement it was taken from Poland and annexed by the Soviet Union. Administratively, Lida became part of Grodno Region.

=== Recent history ===
From the Cold War to 1993, Lida was home to the 1st Guards Bomber Aviation Division of the Soviet Air Force.

In the 2010s, Ivan Kulesh murdered a number of women in the city. He was later executed.

== Jewish community ==
Jews first settled in Lida in the middle of the 16th century, and permission to construct a synagogue was granted by King Stefan Batory in 1579. The temple was decimated and rebuilt with the permission of King Wladyslaw Vasa in 1630, among the city's notable rabbis at the time were Rabbi David ben Aryeh Leib and his son Pethahiah ben David. By 1817, the Jewish Community numbered 567, nearly three-quarters of the total population of the city. Lida had a particularly-sightly brick synagogue.

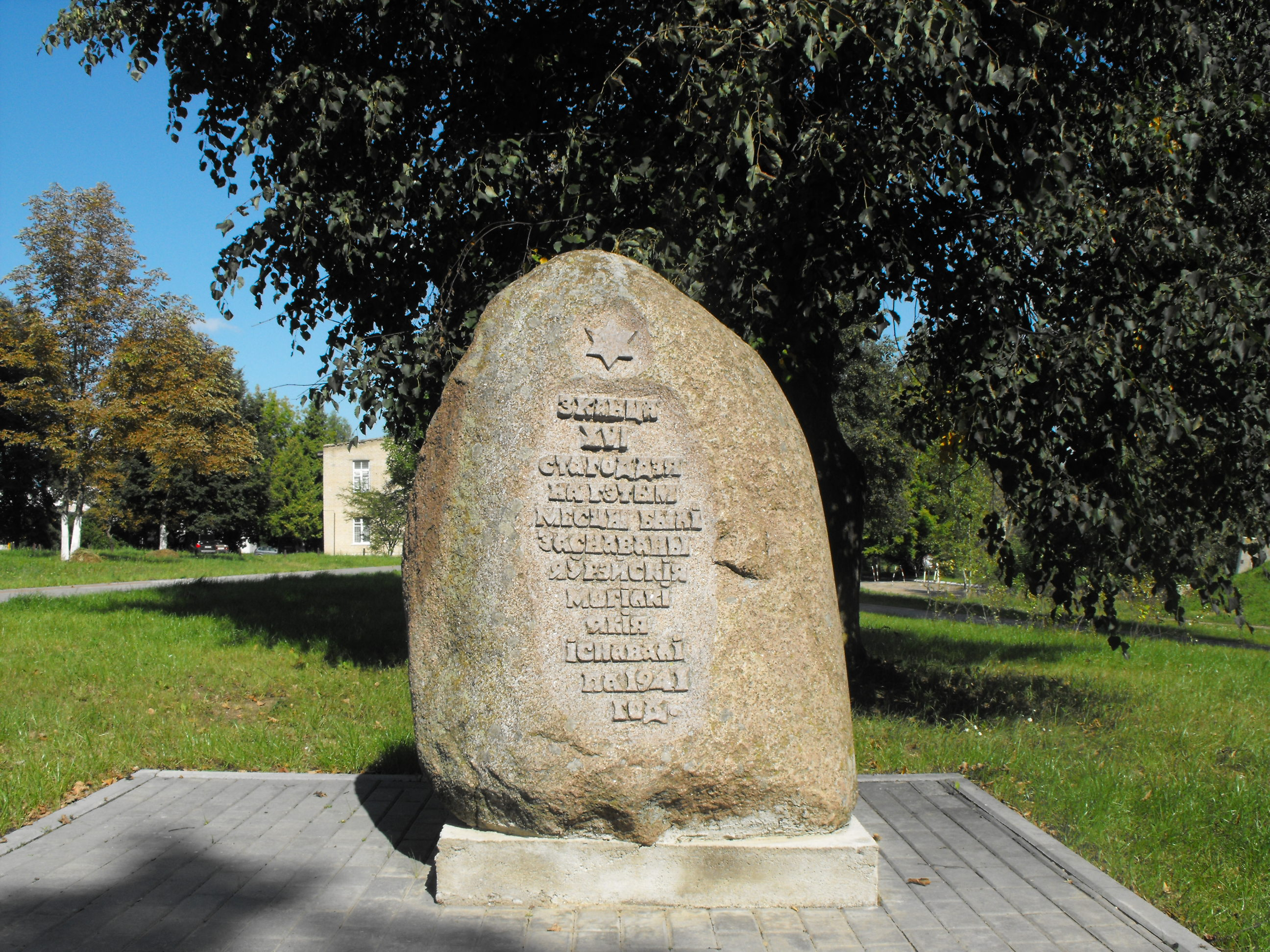
Holocaust memorial

During the First World War, the German army captured Lida on 26 September 1915, and both Jews and non-Jews were forced into labour. Soon after the German Occupation ceased in winter 1918, Bolsheviks entered the city and created a strong sense of the Revolution. On 17 April 1919, Polish soldiers entered Lida and committed a pogrom, killing 39 Jews. Lida was captured by the Red Army on 17 July 1920 but was retaken by Polish troops on 29 September 1920. After the Peace of Riga, it was passed to Poland and became powiat (county) centre in Nowogródek Voivodeship.

The interwar period was a short period of economic growth for the Jewish community. All aspects flourished, and there were 12 fully functioning synagogues. In 1931, the Jewish population grew to 6,335, and at the dawn of the Holocaust, refugees increased the number to nearly 8,500. In the fall of 1939, the Red Army moved in and annexed Lida to the Baranavichy Region of Byelorussian SSR, part of the Soviet Union on 19 September 1939. Under Soviet rule cultural aspects of the Jewish community were diminished.

On 27 June 1941, the Germans severely damaged the city, and by December, a ghetto was created on the suburbs of Lida in which several families ended up crowding into a single home. On 7 May 1942, the ghetto was sealed, and the next day, nearly 6,000 were taken to a military firing range, where they were shot and piled in ready-made grave pits. About 1,500 educated Jews remained in the ghetto, and the population was added to by incoming refugees.

A few groups secretly escaped the city and hid in the forests until the city was liberated on 9 July 1944, but the rest of the community was murdered on 18 September 1943. It was passed to the new Grodno Region in 1944.

== Monuments and attractions ==
Historic architecture of Lida (examples)
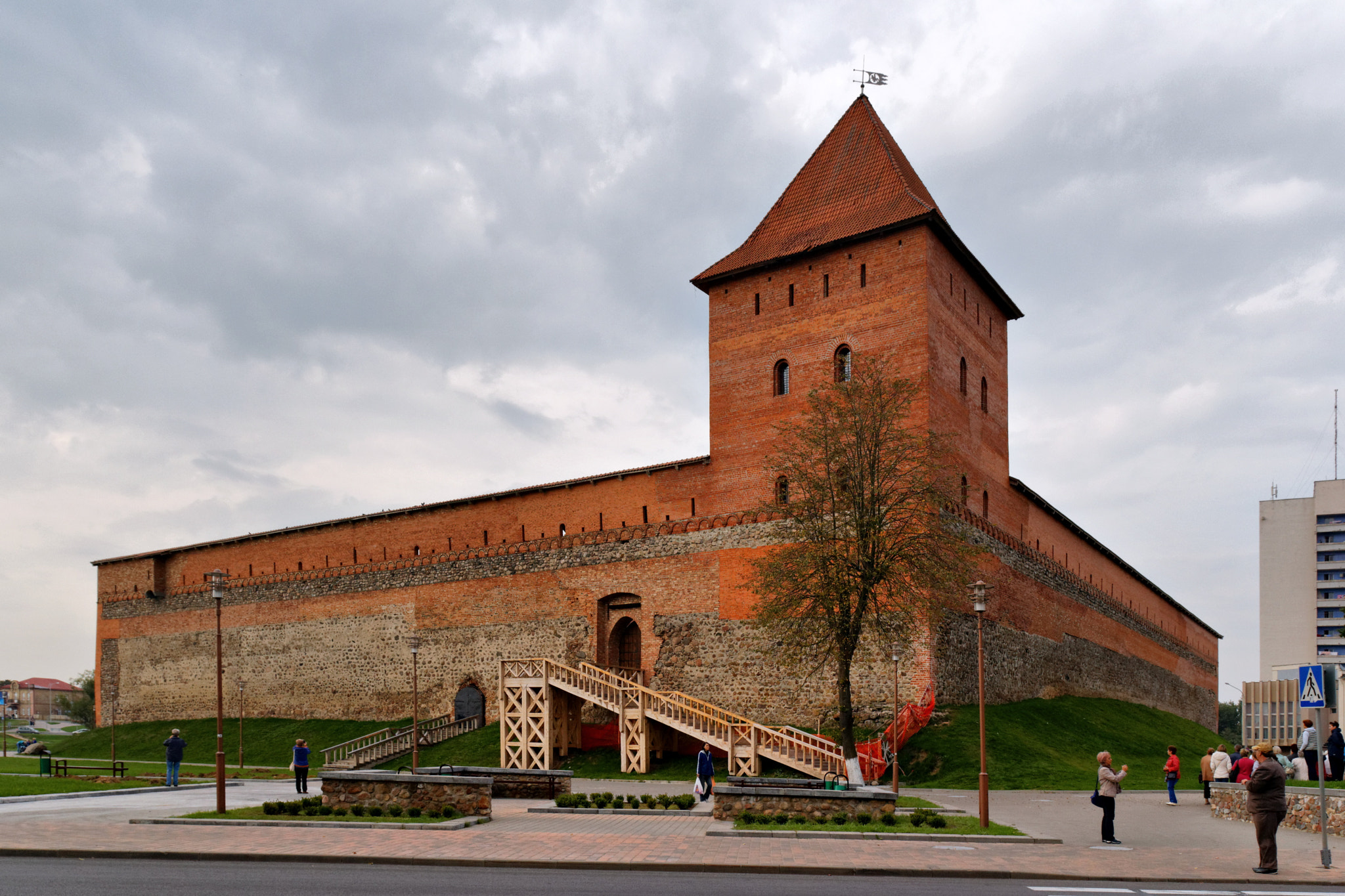
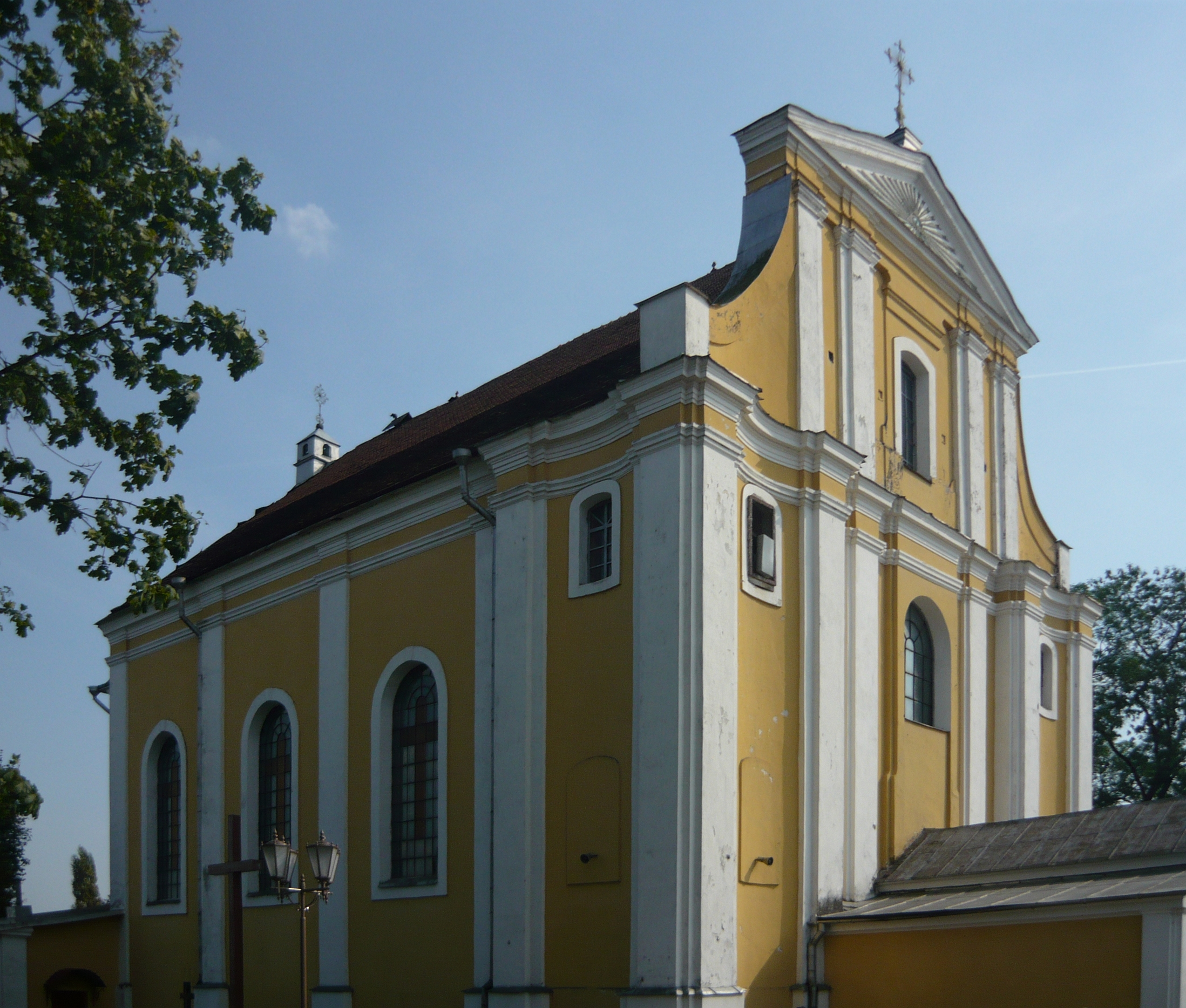
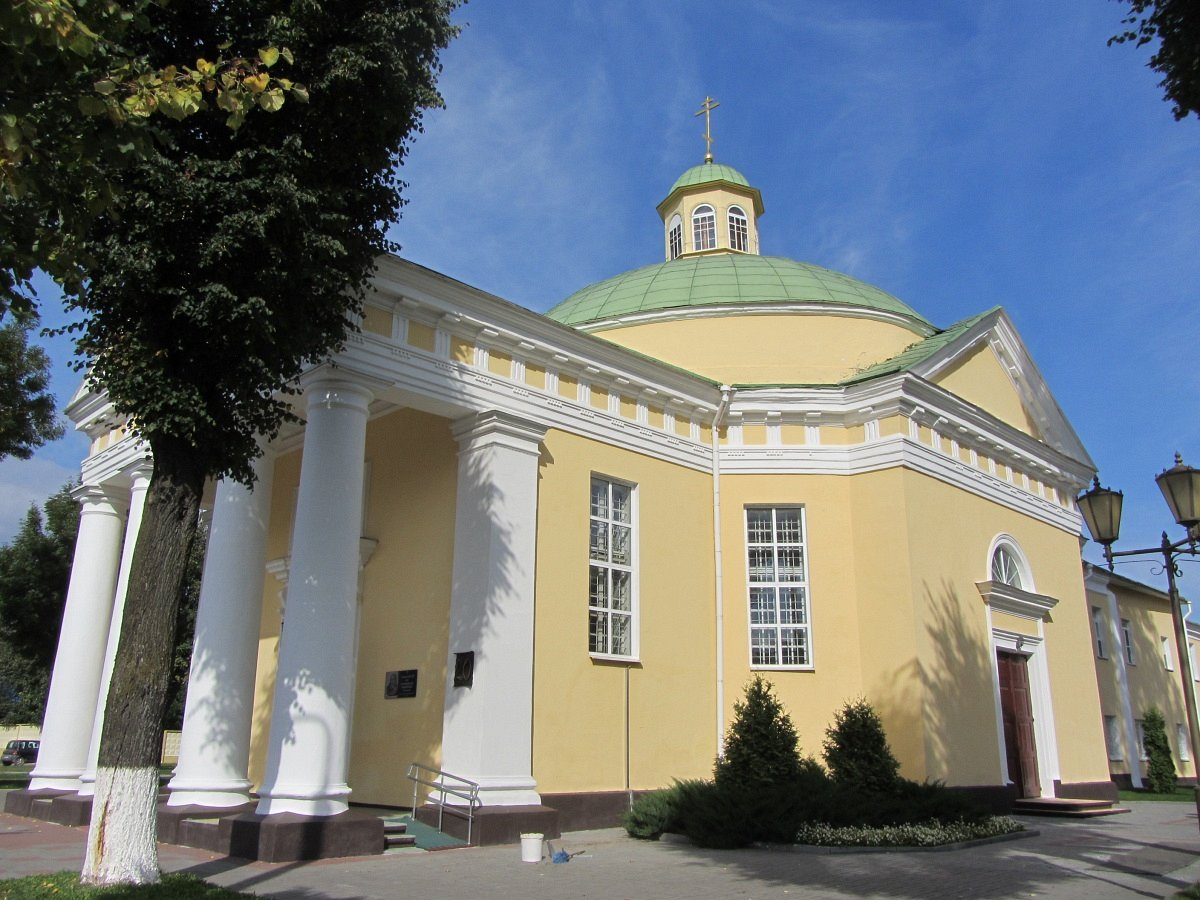
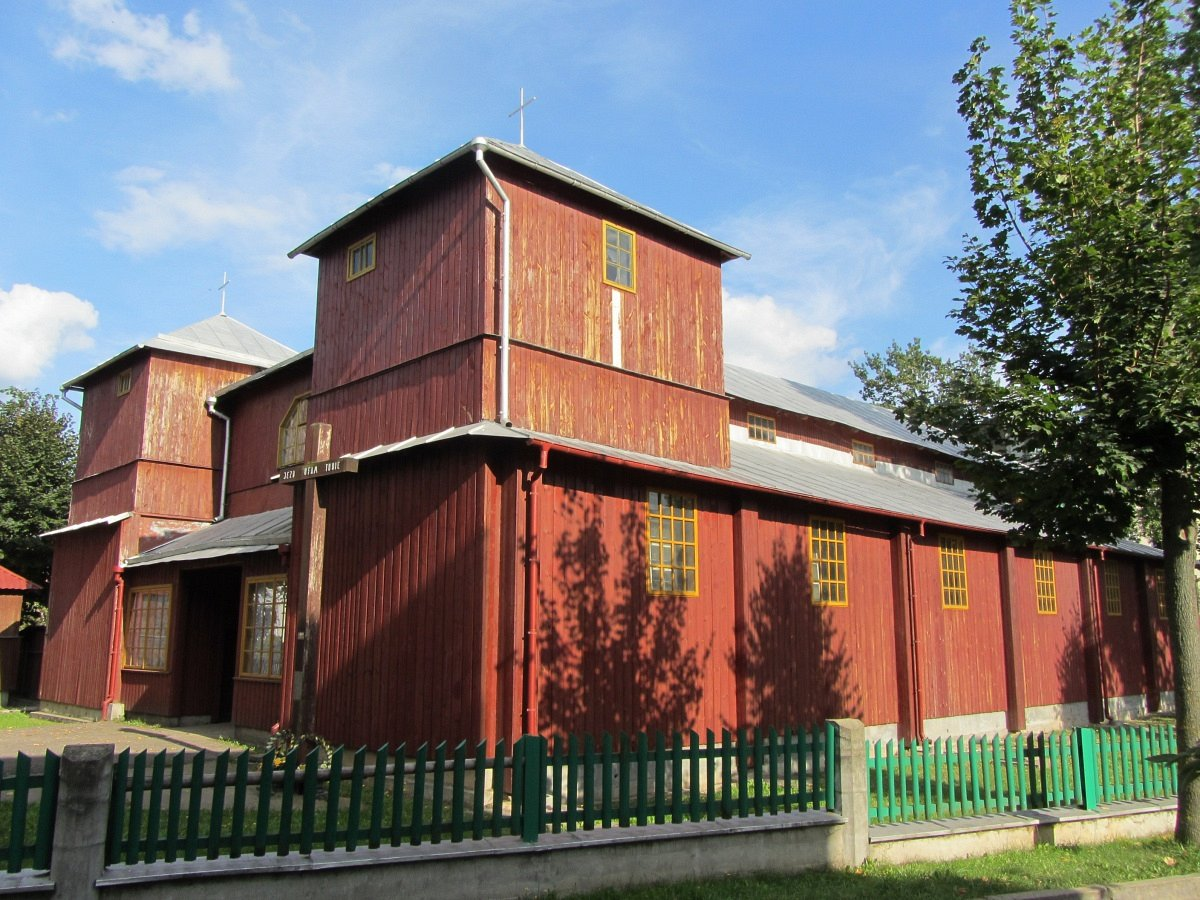
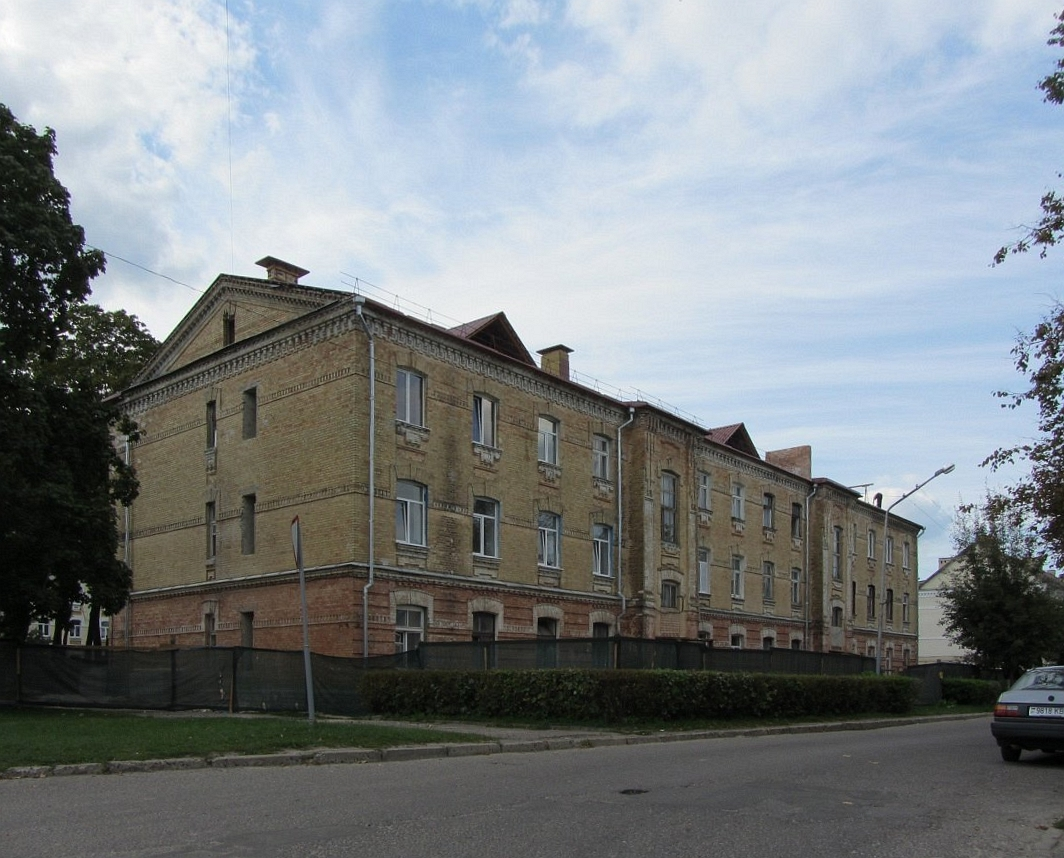
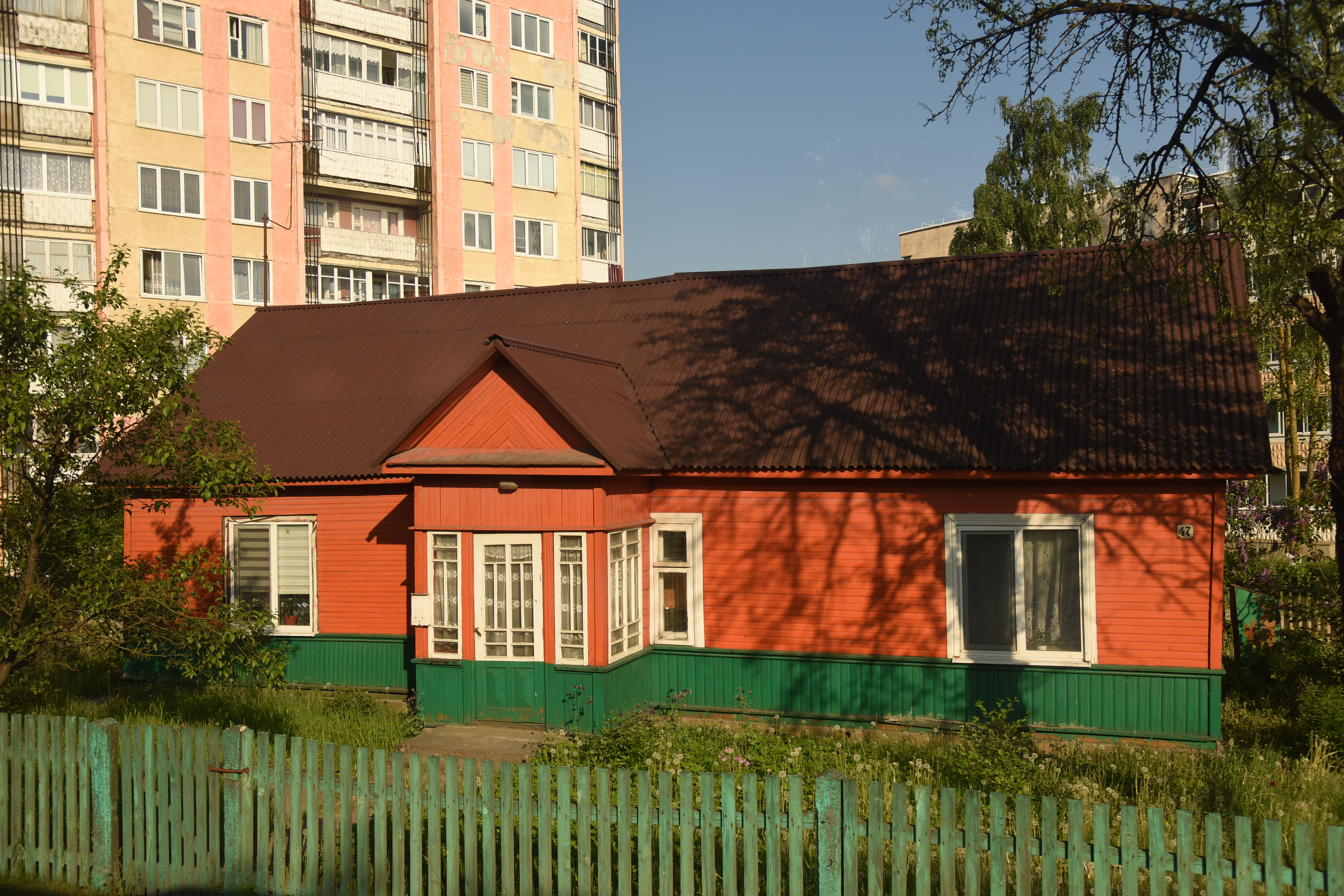
From top, left to right: Lida Castle, Catholic Church of the Exaltation of the Holy Cross, Saint Michael Archangel Orthodox church (former Piarist church), wooden Church of the Immaculate Conception of Mary, former barracks, preserved old wooden house
- Lida Castle was built by the order of the Grand Duke of Lithuania Gediminas for protection against assaults by the Teutonic Knights. The stone foundations were laid in 1323. Parts of the trapezium-shaped fortress were added on up through the 15th century. In the mid-17th century, an army of 30,000 was sent by Prince Nikita Khovansky of Moscow to destroy it, and in the Great Northern War (1700–1721), Swedes came and blew up the castle's towers, permanently diminishing its military purpose. It has since been restored, and tourists come to view its crimson walls.
- The Roman Catholic Church of the Exaltation of the Cross, a fine example of local late Baroque architecture.
- The Piarist Church of St. Joseph in Lida was built in 1794 to 1825. Built in the Late Classicism Style, the round stone church has an attractive dome and front. In 1842, it was destroyed by a fire but was soon rebuilt. It is now an Eastern Orthodox Church.
- Wooden Church of the Immaculate Conception of Mary
- The Catholic Church in Lida was given a new sanctuary in April 2007. The refreshingly-white interior complements the tan exterior.
- In spring 2001, the Jews of Belarus worked closely with the residents of Lida to erect a memorial commemorating the thousands of Lida Jews murdered in the Holocaust. In autumn 2003 was an unveiling ceremony, involving 400 people. Now, visitors and residents alike can take a visit to this memorial, which properly honors all innocent victims of World War II.
- Lida Brewery Museum. It was opened on March 29, 2022, to mark the 146th anniversary of the Lidskoe Pivo OJSC company.
- In 2024, after the reconstruction of the military burial complex in Lida, a memorial sign was erected with the names of 25 fallen liberator soldiers .

== Geography ==
- Altitude: 158 m (518 ft)
- Flat

== Demographics ==
- Population: 102,700 (January 2020); 103,915 (January 2023); 103,916 (January 2024)
- Ethnicity: Belarusians – 49,43%, Poles – 34,84%, Russians – 10,93% (according to 2019 Belarusian data)
- Religion: Eastern Orthodox 40%, Roman Catholic 50%, Other 10%

== Climate ==
The Köppen Climate Classification subtype for the city's climate is Dfb (Warm Summer Continental Climate).

- Winter temperatures: around 1 °C
- Spring temperatures: around 10 °C
- Summer temperatures: around 17 °C
- Autumn temperatures: around 7 °C
- Stormy weather

Climate data for Lida (1991–2020)
Month	Jan	Feb	Mar	Apr	May	Jun	Jul	Aug	Sep	Oct	Nov	Dec	Year
Record high °C (°F)	5.3 (41.5)	6.8 (44.2)	14.0 (57.2)	22.9 (73.2)	27.1 (80.8)	29.5 (85.1)	31.1 (88.0)	31.0 (87.8)	25.9 (78.6)	19.1 (66.4)	11.9 (53.4)	6.8 (44.2)	31.1 (88.0)
Mean daily maximum °C (°F)	−1.1 (30.0)	0.2 (32.4)	5.3 (41.5)	13.3 (55.9)	19.1 (66.4)	22.4 (72.3)	24.4 (75.9)	23.8 (74.8)	17.9 (64.2)	11.0 (51.8)	4.5 (40.1)	0.3 (32.5)	11.8 (53.2)
Daily mean °C (°F)	−3.5 (25.7)	−2.7 (27.1)	1.2 (34.2)	7.9 (46.2)	13.4 (56.1)	16.8 (62.2)	18.8 (65.8)	17.9 (64.2)	12.8 (55.0)	7.1 (44.8)	2.2 (36.0)	−1.8 (28.8)	7.5 (45.5)
Mean daily minimum °C (°F)	−5.7 (21.7)	−5.3 (22.5)	−2.2 (28.0)	3.0 (37.4)	7.9 (46.2)	11.5 (52.7)	13.8 (56.8)	12.8 (55.0)	8.6 (47.5)	4.0 (39.2)	0.2 (32.4)	−3.8 (25.2)	3.7 (38.7)
Record low °C (°F)	−18.8 (−1.8)	−16.4 (2.5)	−10.2 (13.6)	−3.6 (25.5)	0.7 (33.3)	5.4 (41.7)	8.7 (47.7)	6.8 (44.2)	1.3 (34.3)	−3.6 (25.5)	−8.4 (16.9)	−13.9 (7.0)	−18.8 (−1.8)
Average precipitation mm (inches)	46.5 (1.83)	41.2 (1.62)	40.0 (1.57)	39.6 (1.56)	63.9 (2.52)	68.7 (2.70)	85.4 (3.36)	67.6 (2.66)	58.9 (2.32)	54.9 (2.16)	44.9 (1.77)	50.5 (1.99)	662.1 (26.07)
Average precipitation days (≥ 1.0 mm)	11.7	10.5	9.6	8.1	9.7	9.8	10.0	8.7	8.3	9.5	10.1	11.3	117.3
Source: NOAA

== Sport ==
HK Lida of the Belarusian Extraleague is the local pro hockey team.

== Notable people ==
- David ben Aryeh Leib of Lida (ca. 1650–1696), Ashkenazi rabbi
- David Blaustein (1866–1912), American educator, rabbi, and social worker
- Yitzchak Yaacov Reines rabbi of Lida and founder of Mizrakhi Jewish religious Zionist movement
- B. Gorin (1868–1925), American Yiddish playwright, translator, and journalist
- Konstanty Gorski (1859–1924), Polish composer and violinist
- Andrzej Januszajtis (born 1928), Polish physicist and Professor
- Stefan E. Warschawski (1904–1989), mathematician
- Pola Raksa (born 1941), Polish movie star
- Aleksander Zyw (1905–1995), artist born here
- Eduard Palčys (born 1990), blogger and political prisoner

== International relations ==
Lida is twinned with:

- Daugavpils, Latvia
- Dimitrovgrad, Russia
- Goychay, Azerbaijan
- Kalachinsky District, Russia
- Khoroshyovo-Mnyovniki (Moscow), Russia
- Krymsky District, Russia
- Lebedyansky District, Russia
- Lyuberetsky District, Russia
- Nemansky District, Russia
- Rîșcani, Moldova
- Shirak Province, Armenia
