= Władysław Kasza =

Polish lieutenant colonel and Independence Activist

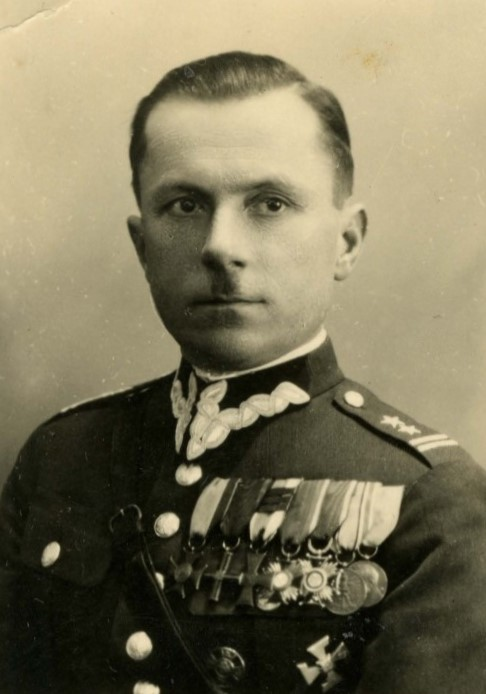
- Born: 6 August 1895; Krosno
- Died: 25 January 1937 (aged 41) Warsaw
- Cause of death: Suicide by firearm
- Allegiance: Second Polish Republic
- Branch: Regiment commander
- Service years: 1914–1937
- Commands: 9th Legions' Infantry Regiment
- Conflicts: World War I Polish–Ukrainian War; Polish–Soviet War
- Awards: Virtuti Militari; Cross of Independence; Cross of Valour (Poland); Cross of Merit; Remembrance Medal for the War 1918-1921; Medal of the Tenth Anniversary of Regained Independence; Badge „For Faithful Service” Swastika of the 4th Infantry Regiment of the Polish Legions

Władysław Kasza – (born 6 August 1895 in Polanka, Krosno, died 25 January 1937 in Warsaw aged 41) lieutenant colonel of infantry of the Polish Armed Forces, independence activist, awarded the Virtuti Militari.

== Early life ==
He was born on the 6th of August 1895 in the village of Polanka, Krosno in the family of Tomasz, a farmer and Zofia from Gieruck. Before 1914, he went to 1st Secondary School named after King Stanisław Leszczyński in Jasło, and then in Sanok, where he completed sixth grade. As of 1913, he was active in the Union of Active Struggle and Riflemen's Association.

== Service ==
On 17 August 1914, he joined the Polish Legions (WW1) and was assigned to the 9th company of the 3rd Infantry Regiment. On 15 March 1915 he was transferred to the 8th company of the 4th Infantry Regiment On 1 January 1917 he was assigned the title of a standard-bearer of the regiment. In April 1917, he served in the National Inspectorate of Enlistment. From 16 September 1917 to 31 October 1918, he served in the Austro-Hungarian Army. On 1 October 1918, he passed the Matura at Primary school no. 8 in the name of Queen Zofia in Sanok.

On 15 November 1918, he was accepted to the Polish Armed Forces, temporarily serving as a sub-lieutenant given by major general Bolesław Roja. During the years of fighting from 1918 to 1921 Kasza served in the 4th Legions' Infantry Regiment. During this period he captured a total of around 400 prisoners, seized four cannons and 30 machine guns. On the 17th of February 1919, he was wounded in Lviv.

On 3 May 1922 he was promoted to Captain with seniority accompanying him from 1 June 1919 and the 281st place in the infantry officer corps. On 10 July 1922 he was approved as the commander of the 3rd battalion of the 4th Legions' Infantry Regiment in Kielce. On 31 March 1924, he was promoted to Major with seniority as of 1 July 1923 and 89th place in the infantry officer corps. After being promoted to Major he was approved as commander of the battalion. On 25 October 1924, he was transferred to the Border Protection Corps as commander of the 11th Border Battalion.

In January 1928, he was transferred from KOP to the 25th Infantry Regiment in Piotrków as the commander of the 3rd battalion. In April of this year, he was transferred to the 12th Infantry Regiment (which belonged to Kraków) in Wadowice as the commander of the 3rd battalion. In March 1929, he was transferred to the 4th Podhale Rifles Regiment in Cieszyn as deputy commander of the regiment. On the 24th of December 1929, the president of the Second Polish Republic made him lieutenant colonel and 11th place in the infantry corps as of 1 January 1930.

On 20 November 1932, he was transferred to the 33rd Infantry Regiment as deputy commander of the regiment. In August 1933, he was dismissed from his position retaining his previous service allowance. In April 1934, he was transferred to the Częstochowa Square Command as commander. From the 5th of November 1935, he commanded the 9th Legions' Infantry Regiment in Zamość. On the 12th of January 1937, he was transferred to the Corps District no. II as commander.

== Death ==
On the night of the 24–25 January 1937, he committed suicide in Warsaw, using a firearm. He died unmarried, having no children.

== Cited sources ==
- Kasza Władysław: Kolekcja Orderu Wojennego Virtuti Militari, sygn. I.482.73-6771. Military Historical Office (Available 2023-01-20)
- Lista starszeństwa oficerów Legionów Polskich w dniu oddania Legionów Polskich Wojsku Polskiemu (12 kwietnia 1917). Command of the Polish Legions, 1917.
- Dziennik Personalny Ministerstwa Spraw Wojskowych. (Available 2022-01-19).
- Lista starszeństwa oficerów zawodowych. Warsaw: Ministry of Military Affairs, 1922.
- Rocznik Oficerski 1923. Warsaw: Ministry of Military Affairs, 1923.
- Rocznik Oficerski 1924. Warsaw: Ministry of Military Affairs, 1924.
- Rocznik Oficerski 1928. Warsaw: Ministry of Military Affairs, 1928.
- Rocznik Oficerski 1932. Warsaw: Ministry of Military Affairs, 1932.
- Lista starszeństwa oficerów zawodowych piechoty. 5 czerwiec 1935. Warsaw: Infantry Department of the Ministry of Military Affairs, 1935.
- Ś. p. pułk. Władysław Kasza. „Good evening! Red Courier”. Nr 26, s. 5, 26 January 1937.
- Ś. p. pułk. Władysław Kasza „Lviv newspaper”. Nr 20, s. 3, 27 January 1937.
