= Edward Dojan-Surówka =

Polish officer

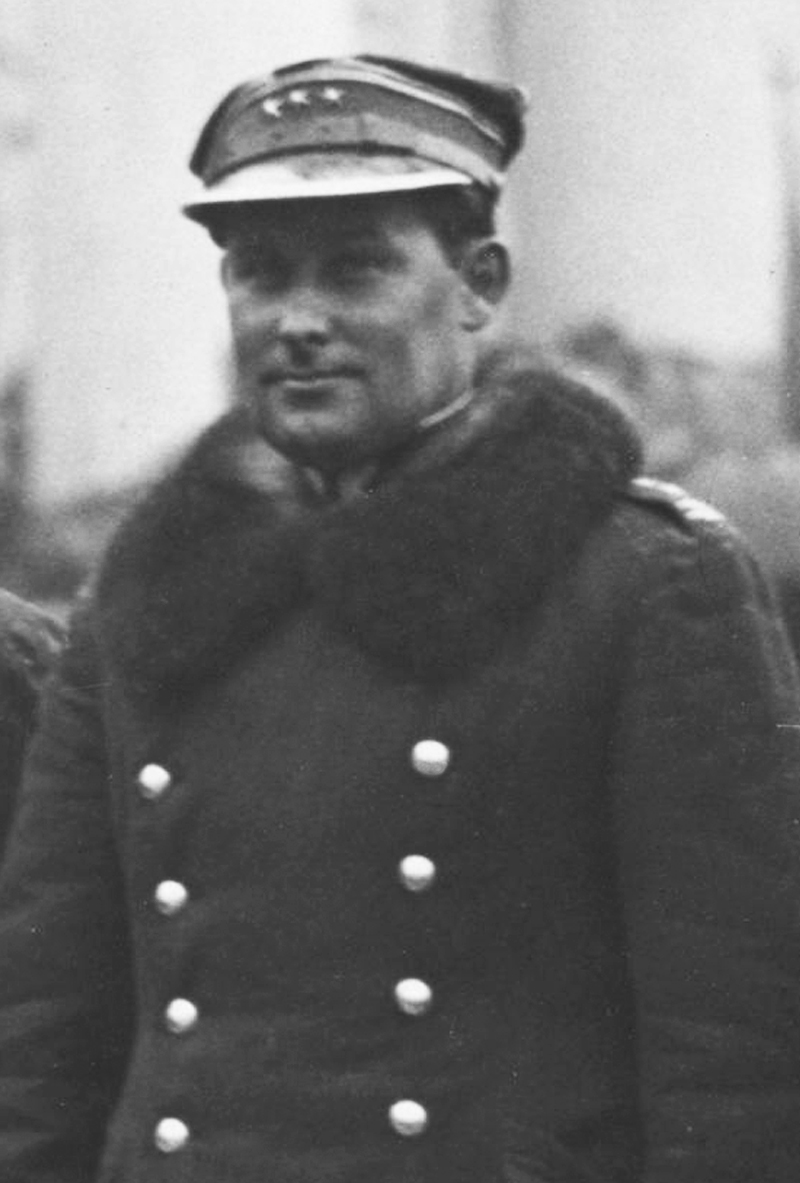

Jan Edward Dojan-Surowka (27 December 1894 in Wielopole Skrzynskie – 6 November 1982) was a soldier of the Polish Legions in World War I and Colonel of Infantry in the Polish Army in the interwar period.

During World War I, Dojan-Surowka served in the 1st Brigade, Polish Legions. Nominated to the rank of officer, he served in the 5th Legions Regiment of Infantry. In 1917, after the Oath crisis, he was forced to join the Austro-Hungarian Army and fight on the Eastern Front. In 1919, he joined the Siberian Division. Captured by the Bolsheviks together with other Polish soldiers, Dojan-Surowka managed to escape.

He fought in the Polish-Soviet War, as commandant of the 201st Volunteer Division (see Volunteer Army (Poland)). In 1921, he was named commandant of the 15th Infantry Regiment. On 22 July 1922 Edward Dojan-Surowka was transferred to the 45th Kresy Rifles Regiment in Rowne, and on 21 August 1926 he was named commandant of the 21st Children of Warsaw Infantry Regiment, stationed in Warsaw.

Promoted to colonel on 1 January 1929, he was in 1934 appointed commandant of infantry of the 2nd Legions Infantry Division (Kielce). On 25 April 1938 Dojan-Surowka was named commandant of the 2nd Legions Infantry Division.

During the Invasion of Poland, in the night of 8–9 September 1939, Edward Dojan-Surowka suffered a nervous breakdown after a raid carried out by a German unit. Together with other officers (Colonel Mieczyslaw Peczkowski and Major Stefan Prokop), he abandoned his soldiers and drove to Warsaw, leaving the division under command of his deputy, Colonel Antoni Staich. Since Marshal Edward Smigly-Rydz had already left the capital, Dojan-Surowka followed him to Romania. After the war, he remained in Great Britain, never returning to Poland. Some historians regard him as one of the worst officers of the Polish Army in the 1939 campaign. Dojan-Surowka died in 1982 in Wales.

== Sources ==
- Mieczysław Bielski: Grupa Operacyjna „Piotrków” 1939. Warszawa: Wydawnictwo Bellona, 1991

== Promotions ==
- Podporucznik (Sub-Lieutenant) – 28 April 1916,
- porucznik (Lieutenant) – 1 November 1916,
- Major – 3 May 1922,
- Podpolkovnik (Sub-Colonel) - 31 March 1924,
- Polkovnik (Colonel) - 1 January 1929.

== Honors and awards ==
- Silver Cross of the Virtuti Militari,
- Cross of Independence With Swords,
- Officer’s Cross of the Polonia Restituta,
- Cross of Valour (Poland), four times,
- Gold Cross of Merit (Poland),
- Cross of Merit of the Republic of Central Lithuania,
- Commemorative Medal for the War of 1918-1921,
- Medal of Ten Years of Independent Poland
