= Bolesław Roja =

Polish military officer (1876–1940)

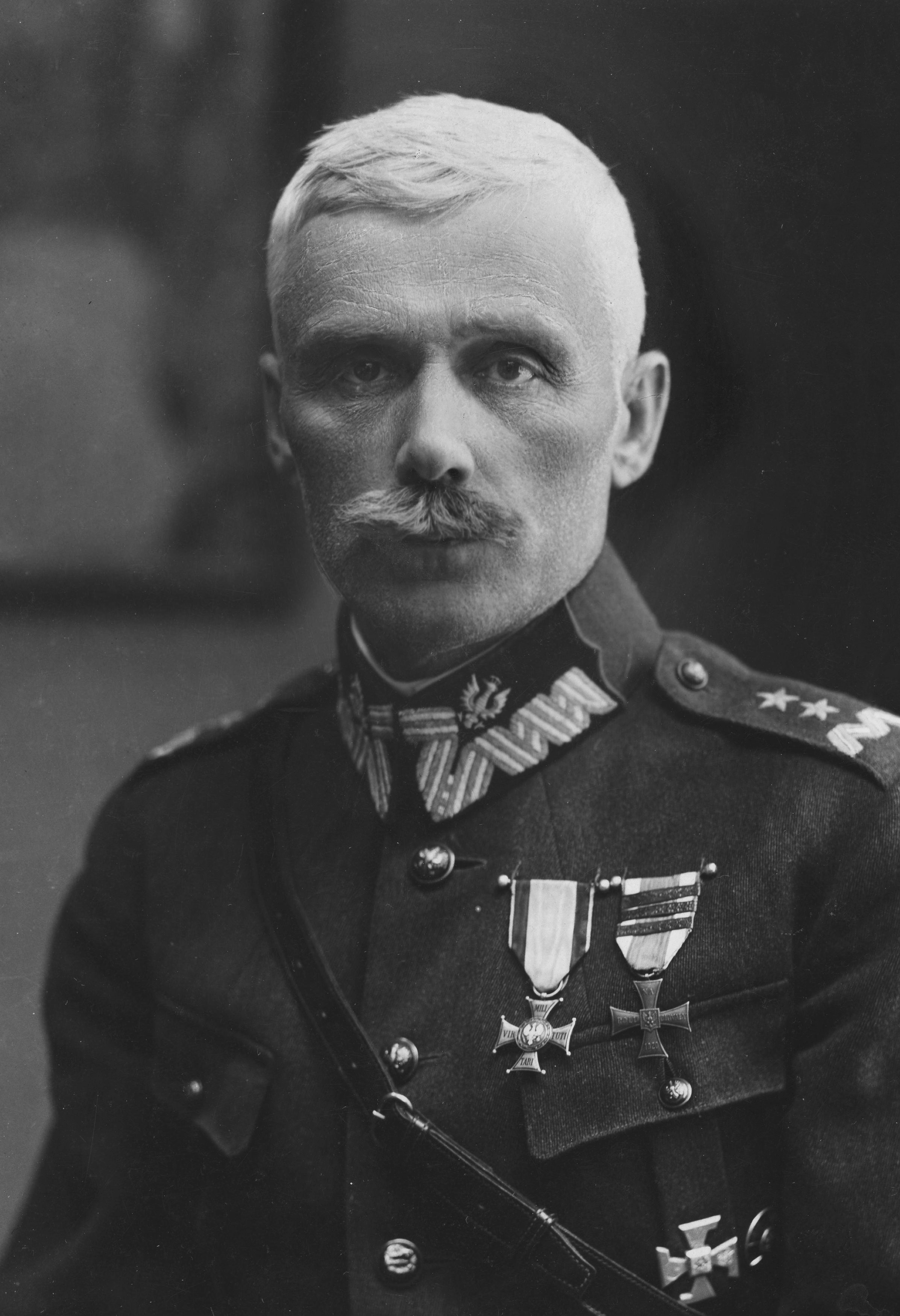
- Born: 4 April 1876; Bryńce Zagórne, Austria-Hungary
- Died: 27 May 1940 (aged 64); Sachsenhausen concentration camp, Nazi Germany
- Military career
- Allegiance: Austria-Hungary (1899–1905, 1914–1918); Second Polish Republic (1918–1922)
- Branch: Austro-Hungarian Army; Polish Legions; Polish Army
- Service years: 1899–1905; 1914–1922
- Rank: Brigadier General
- Conflicts: First World War; Polish–Soviet War
- Awards: Order of Virtuti Militari; Cross of Independence; Cross of Valour (4 times)

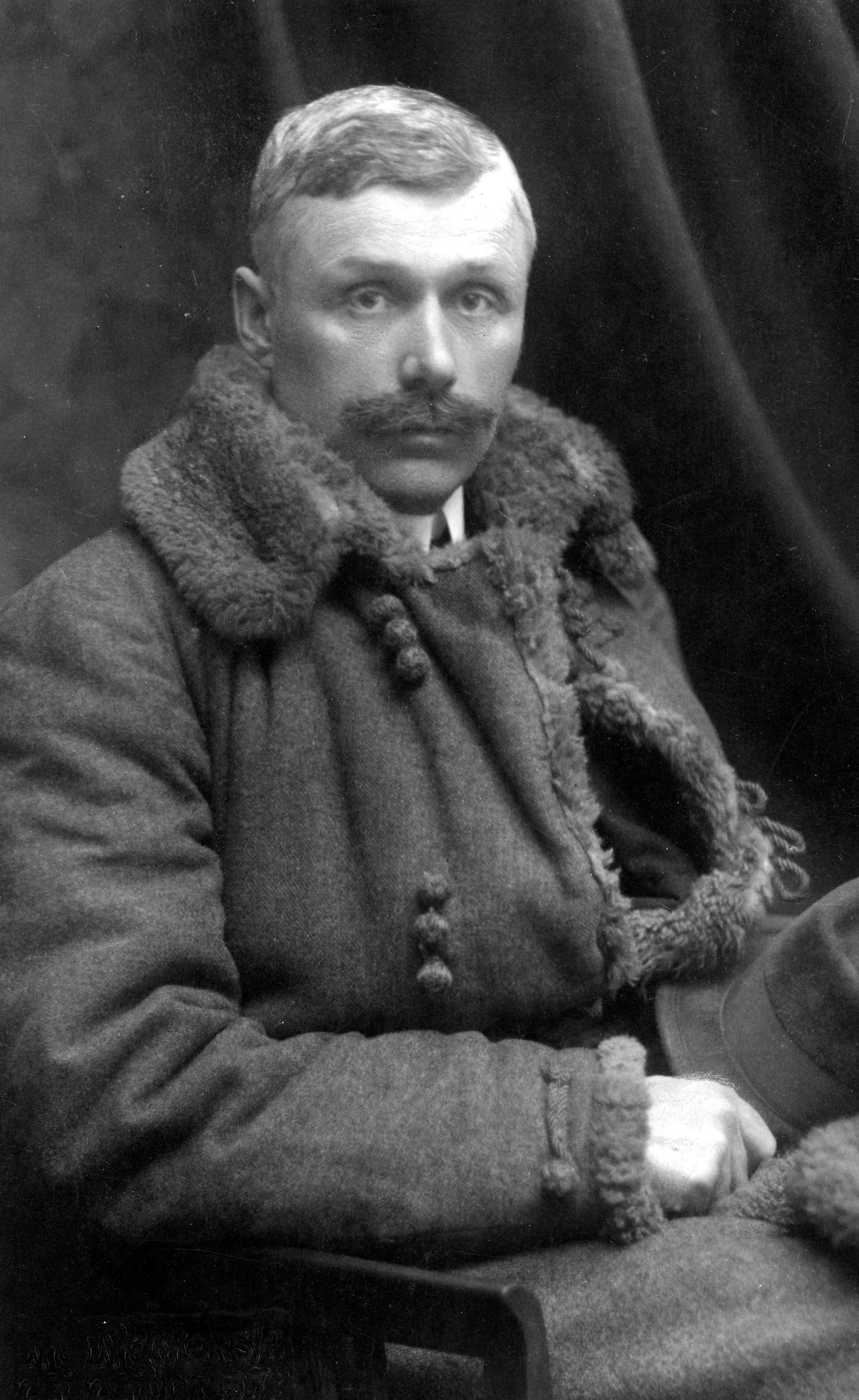
Bolesław Roja with the Polish parliament Sejm

Brigadier General Bolesław Jerzy Roja (4 April 1876 − 27 May 1940) was an officer of the Polish Legions in World War I, a general, and a politician in the Second Polish Republic, recipient of some of the highest Polish military awards including Virtuti Militari. He opposed Józef Piłsudski and his Sanacja regime in the 1920s. After the German invasion of Poland in 1939 he was arrested and murdered by the Nazis in Sachsenhausen concentration camp.

== Life ==
Roja was born on 4 April 1876 in the village of Bryńce Zagórne near Żydaczów, Austrian Galicia to a family of forester Józef Roja and Maria née Trzcińska. He graduated from the Austro-Hungarian Army Cadet School in Vienna. In 1899 he was promoted to Second Lieutenant, and served with the 36th Land Defence Regiment (k.k. Landwehr Infanterie Regiment Nr. 36) in Kolomyja. In 1905, due to poor health, he was transferred to army reserve. Roja cooperated with Austro-Hungarian intelligence. For a time, he studied law and medicine at Jagiellonian University, and work as a civil servant in Kraków.

After the outbreak of World War I, Roja joined Polish Legions. He was a close coworker of Józef Piłsudski, but after the Oath crisis, he left the Legions and rejoined the Austro-Hungarian Army. In early 1918, he served in Graz, returning to Kraków after several months. Bolesław Roja immediately got involved in Polish patriotic activities. In late October 1918 he took over former Austrian Military Command in Kraków, and, on 1 November, the Regency Council, in recognition of his outstanding services, promoted him to the rank of Generał brygady and named him commandant of Kraków garrison. Roja's promotion was soon confirmed by Polish Commander-in-chief, Jozef Pilsudski.

=== Second Polish Republic ===
Between February and August 1919, Roja commanded the Polish 2nd Legions Infantry Division, fighting for the return of Poland's sovereignty against the Red Army in present-day Belarus (see the Polish–Soviet War). On 8 August 1919, his unit captured Minsk, after which Roja was transferred to the command of the garrison of Kielce. In March 1920 he commanded Polish Army in Pomerelia (Okręg Generalny VIII Toruń), and in August 1920, he was commandant of Narew Operational Group of the Polish Northern Front. Roja was skeptical about Polish victory in the war against Soviet Russia. In July 1920, when the Red Army reached the suburbs of Warsaw, he planned to declare independence of Pomerelia, and sign a separatist peace with the Soviets. Due to his defeatist approach and involvement in politics, he was in late August 1920 demoted from his position. On 20 September, Roja was transferred to reserve until 1922.

In the late 1920s, Roja frequently criticized Józef Piłsudski and his sanacja government. In 1928 he was elected to the Sejm as member of Stronnictwo Chłopskie peasant party. He was chief deputy of Military Commission of the Parliament, and in December 1929 he resigned from the Sejm. In August 1930, Roja wrote an open letter to Pilsudski, but the document was confiscated by the censorship before its official release. In 1937, upon an order of General Tadeusz Kasprzycki, Roja was interned at a psychiatric ward of the Kraków's military hospital. Roja did not fight in the Invasion of Poland. In late 1939, he became involved in charity activities of the Polish Red Cross. In March 1940, Roja was arrested by the Germans and placed in the infamous Pawiak prison in Warsaw. In May 1940 he was transferred to Sachsenhausen concentration camp, where he was murdered on 27 May 1940.

== Awards and honors ==
- Silver Cross of Virtuti Militari.
- Cross of Independence.
- Cross of Valour, four times.

== Promotions ==
- General brygady, November 2, 1918,
- General dywizji – 1922.

== See also ==
- Battle of Ostrołęka (1920)
