= Lida Castle =

Castle in Lida, Belarus

Coordinates: 53.887073°N 25.30272°E

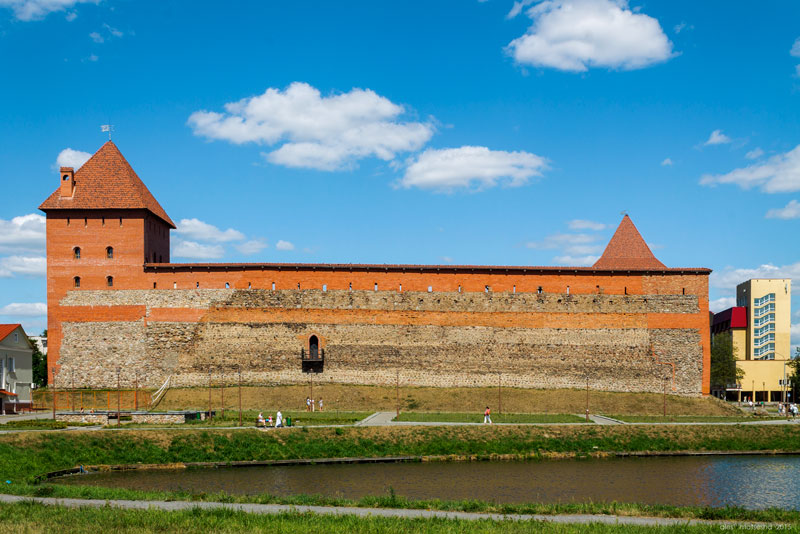
Lida castle

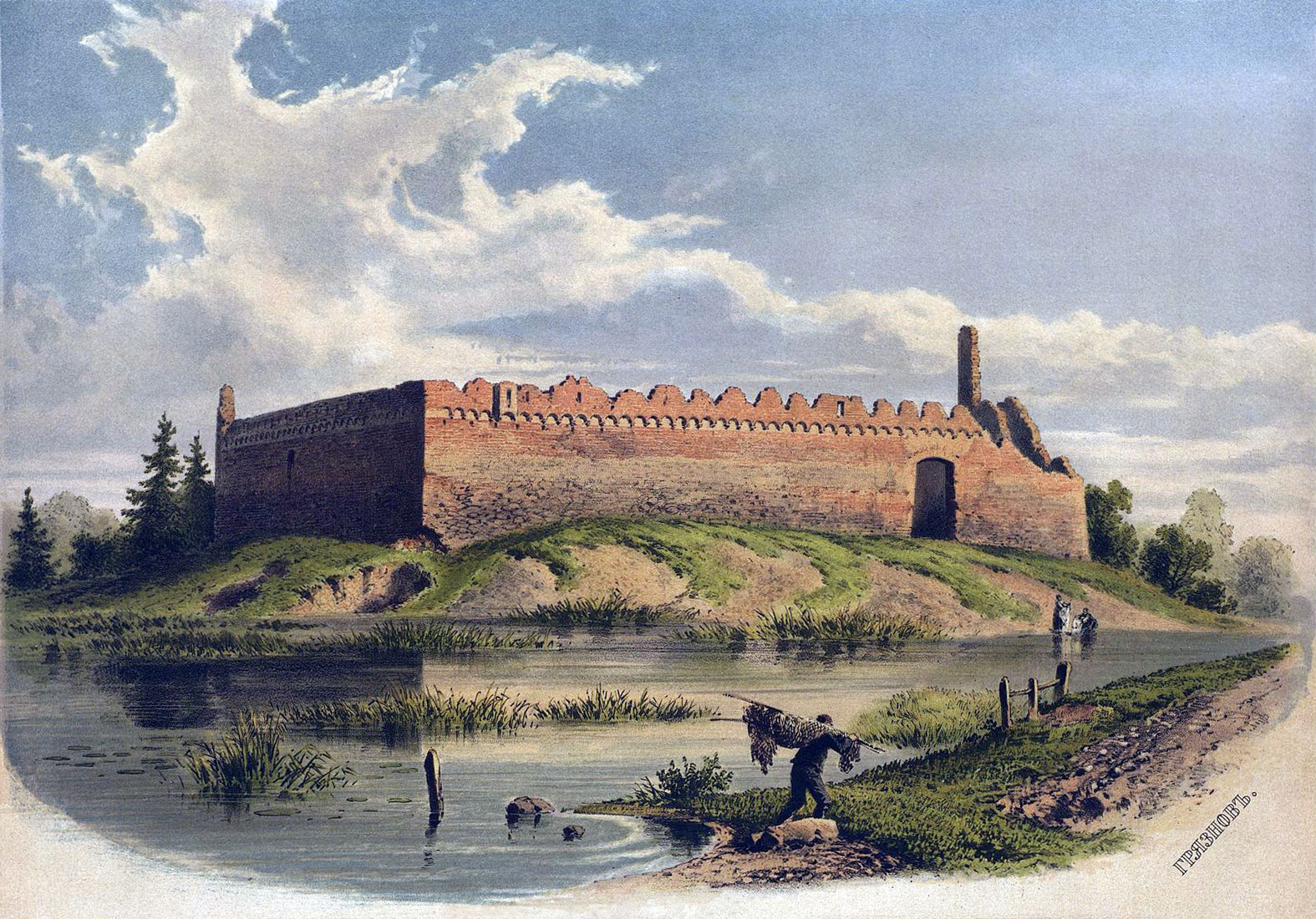
Historic view in 1874

Lida Castle (Belarusian: Лідскі замак, Lithuanian: Lydos pilis, Polish: Zamek w Lidzie) is a historic, medieval castle in Lida, Grodno Region, western Belarus.

== History ==
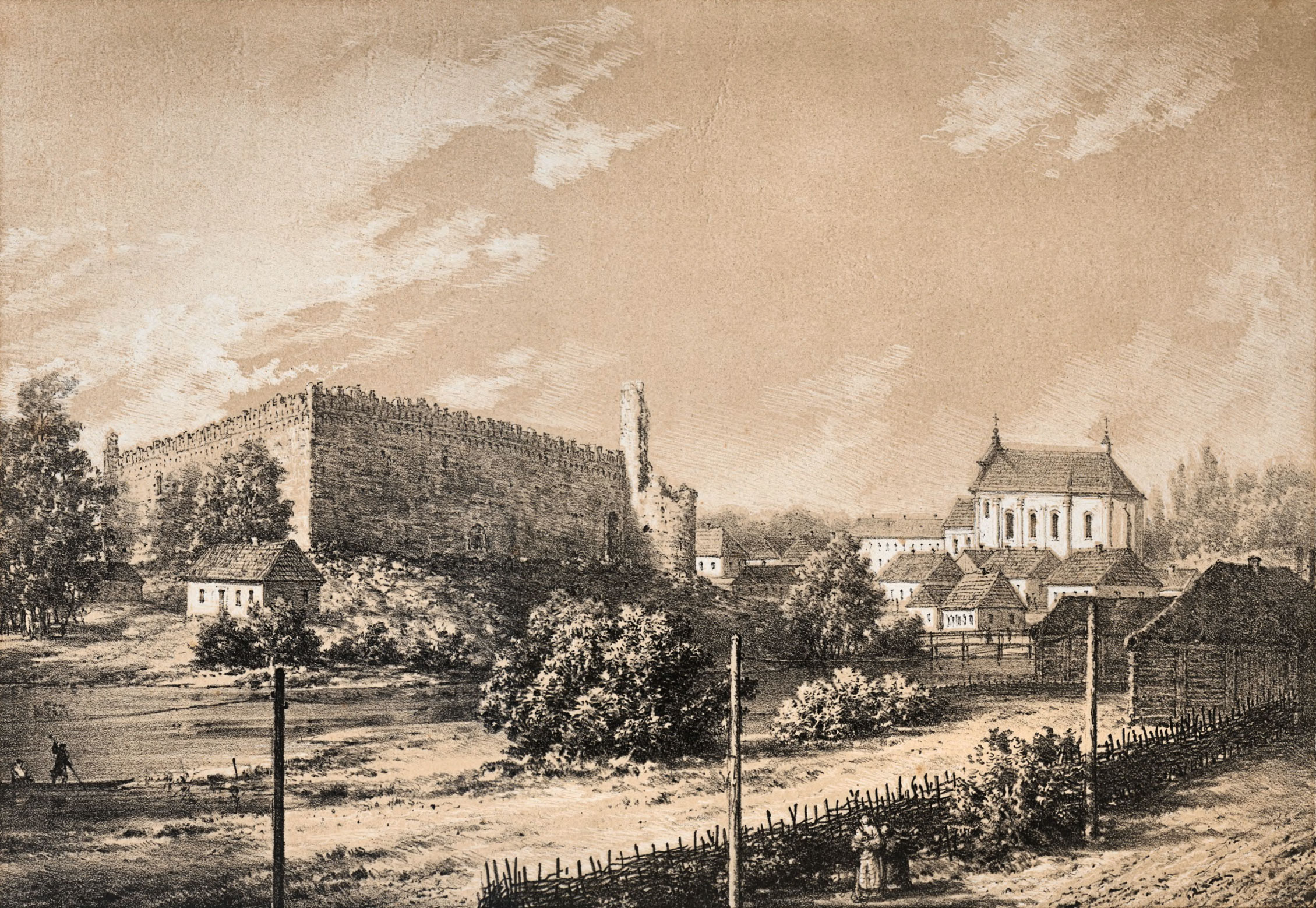
Landscape of Lida with castles ruins by Napoleon Orda 1877

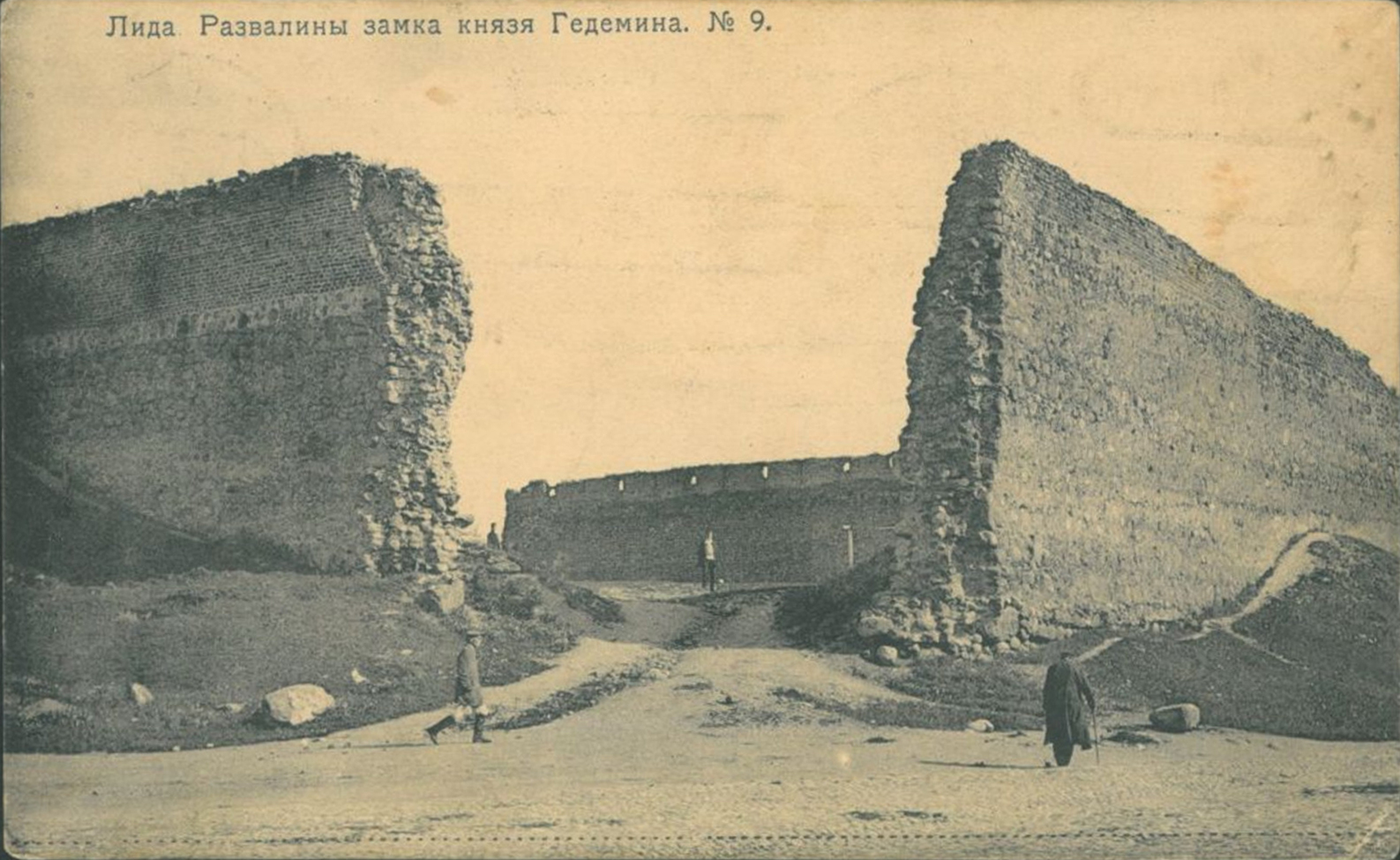
Ruins of the Lida Castle in 1912

It was one of several citadels erected by Grand Duke Gediminas of Lithuania in the early 14th century to defend his lands against the expansion of the Teutonic Knights. Other links in the Vilnius defensive chains included Dubingiai, Kernavė, Punia, Eišiškės, Kreva, Medininkai, Senieji Trakai and Trakai. The modern town of Lida, Belarus grew up around this castle. Lida Castle is 141 metres (463 ft) above sea level.

The site selected for the castle is naturally defended by the Kamenka and Lida rivers to east and west. Construction of boulder walls was carried out in 1323, 1324, and 1325. Later they were faced with red brick. The castle had two angle towers and a church, which was moved outside the walls in 1533. The upper storeys of both towers were lived in.

Despite its strong fortifications, Lida was taken by the Teutonic Knights on several occasions (1384, 1392). Lithuanian Grand Duke Vytautas gave it to his ally, Khan Tokhtamysh, who settled "in a yurt near the castle". In 1406, the family of Yury of Smolensk was locked up in Lida as hostages; his attempt to take the castle and liberate them was not successful. In 1433, Lida was a point of contention between Švitrigaila and his cousin Sigismund Kęstutaitis.

The following decades were somewhat less stormy. Lida was ravaged by the Crimean Tatars in 1506 and it was stormed by the Russians during the Russo-Polish War in 1659. The Swedes, taking it twice during the Great Northern War, had both towers blown up. In 1794, the castle grounds were the site of a battle between Kościuszko's followers and the Russians.

After the city fire of 1891, the south-western tower and parts of the western wall of the castle were torn down to provide stone for repairing fire-damaged houses. A team of archaeologists from St. Petersburg intervened to halt vandalism. There was only a slight restoration of the walls in the 1920s.

During much of the 20th century, an itinerant zoo or circus occupied the castle compound. Every December a Christmas tree was placed within the walls. It was not until 1982 that a restoration campaign was launched. The red brick was used to denote the newly reconstructed sections, up to 12 metres (39 ft) high. Significant restoration occurred in 2010.

Each year, the Lida Castle hosts a medieval-style tournament. A museum is being created within its towers.
