= Oliver Venndt Kaszas =

Danish beach volleyball player

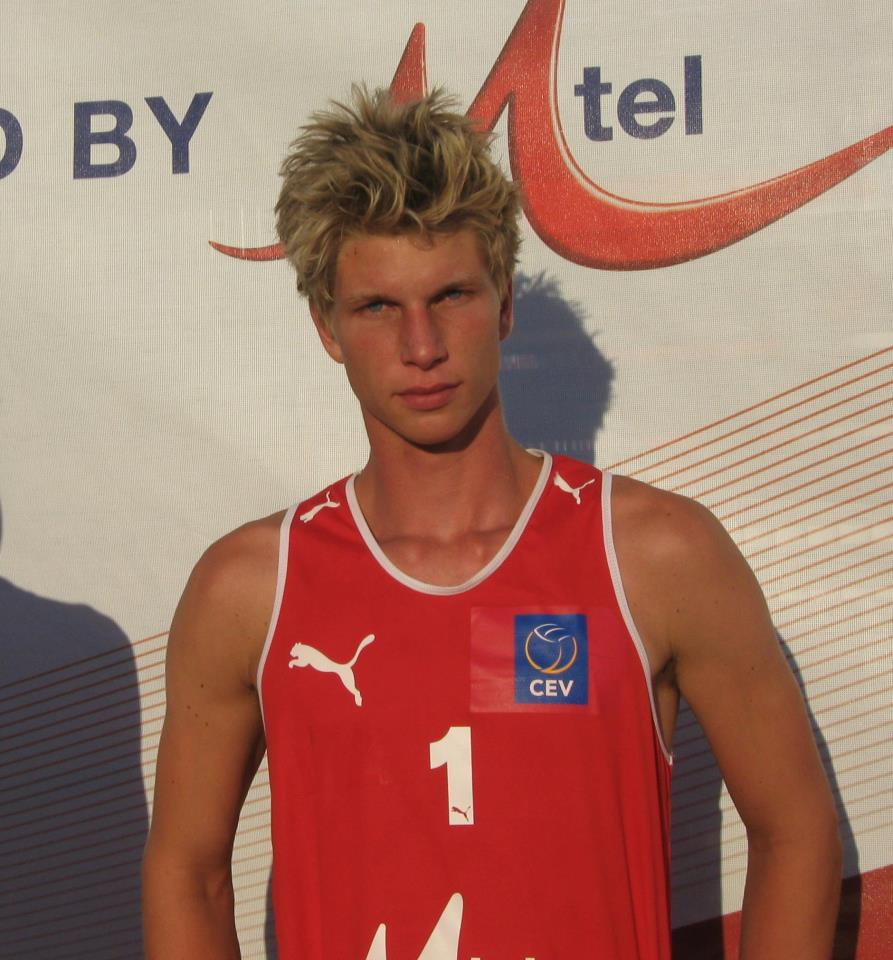

Personal information
- Full name: Oliver Venndt Kaszas
- Nationality: Denmark
- Born: July 27, 1991 (age 35); Copenhagen, Denmark
- Hometown: Copenhagen, Denmark
- Height: 1.93 m (6 ft 4 in)

Beach volleyball information

Current teammate
Years	Teammate
2001–present	Sebastian Venndt Kaszas
Honours
Men's beach volleyball
Representing Denmark
European Championship
Silver medal – second place	2010 Catania	Beach
Danish National Championship
Gold medal – first place	2015	Beach
Gold medal – first place	2014	Beach
Silver medal – second place	2011	Beach
Bronze medal – third place	2016	Beach
Bronze medal – third place	2017	Beach
Bronze medal – third place	2023	Beach

Oliver Venndt Kaszas (born July 27, 1991) is a Danish professional beach volleyball player. He and his brother, Sebastian Venndt Kaszas, represent the national team of Denmark. Oliver and Sebastian, known as The Kaszas Brothers, are sons of the former professional beach volley player Kim Kaszas.

== International career ==
Kaszas, along with his brother, won the silver medal at the European Championship in 2010. It is the first and only medal for Denmark in an international championship in volley or beach volley.

=== World Tour ===
Kaszas has been playing on Swatch FIVB World Tour since 2008, representing Denmark. At the age of 20 and on the youngest team at the World Tour, Oliver managed to finish 88th in 2011 in the official FIVB World Rankings.

=== European Championships ===
- 2nd in 2010
- 4th in 2008
- 5th in 2009
- 9th in 2007

== National ==
Oliver Venndt Kaszas is in the top of Danish beach volley, he played in the league for adults since he was 14 years old.

- 2015 Danish Champion
- 2014 Danish Champion
- 2011 2nd Danish National Championships
- 2010 1st Overall Team Ranking on the Danish Official Ranking

== Olympic Games 2016 ==
Oliver Venndt Kaszas is participating in an official cooperation between Team Danmark and Danish Volley Federation in order to participate in the Olympic Games in 2016 in Rio de Janeiro, Brazil.

== Highlights by year ==
Highlights by year
2016
Danish National Championship Final	3rd
Danish Beachvolley Tour – Hornbæk Semifinalestævne	1st
Danish Beachvolley Tour – Copenhagen Grand Slam	1st
Danish Beachvolley Tour – Ishøj	1st
Danish Beachvolley Tour – Copenhagen I	1st
Danish Beachvolley Tour – Copenhagen II	1st
Danish Beachvolley Tour – Odense	2nd
Danish Beachvolley Tour – Kolding	3rd
Danish Beachvolley Tour – Bellevue	4th
Danish Beachvolley Tour – Kerteminde	4th
2015
Danish National Championship Final	1st
Danish Beachvolley Tour – Kerteminde	1st
Danish Beachvolley Tour – Kolding	1st
Danish Beachvolley Tour – Ishøj	1st
Danish Beachvolley Tour – Amager	1st
Danish Beachvolley Tour – Bellevue (II)	2nd
Danish Beachvolley Tour – Odense	2nd
Danish Beachvolley Tour – Bellevue (I)	3rd
2014
Danish National Championship Final	1st
Danish Beachvolley Tour – Copenhagen	1st
Danish Beachvolley Tour – Aabenraa	1st
Danish Beachvolley Tour – Aarhus	3rd
Danish Beachvolley Tour – Vejers	5th
Florida Beach Volleyball Tour – AVP Next	3rd
2013
Dig The Beach – Fort Lauderdale Brazilian Open	5th
2012
Lyngby Open – Denmark	1st
Florida Beach Volleyball Tour – Ft. Lauderdale	3rd
Dig the Beach – Siesta Key Open	3rd
2011
Danish National Championships	2nd
World Championship	9th
World Tour Ranking by end of season	88th
European Tour Ranking by end of season	60th
2010
European Championship	2nd
Danish Tour Ranking by end of season	1st
World Tour Ranking by end of season	96th
Tournaments won outside Denmark	3
Finals played	8
2009
European Championship	5th
Tournaments won outside Denmark	3
2008
European Championship	4th
World Tour	1st event played
2007
European Championship	9th
