= László Kaszás =

Hungarian footballer

Personal information
- Full name: László Kaszás Kaszner
- Date of birth: February 18, 1938 (age 88)
- Place of birth: Budapest, Hungary
- Height: 1.73 m (5 ft 8 in)
- Positions: Forward; midfielder

Senior career*
Years	Team	Apps	(Gls)
1956–1957	Vasas	?	(?)
1957–1959	Barcelona	?	(?)
1959–1960	Real Madrid	0	(0)
1960–1961	Racing de Santander	19	(4)
1961–1962	Venezia	10	(1)
1962–1963	Constancia	22	(17)
1963–1965	Espanyol	17	(4)
1965–1967	Lleida	34	(10)
1967	Philadelphia Spartans	14	(3)
1968	Saint Louis Stars	4	(0)
1968	New York Generals	14	(0)
1968–1969	Tarrasa		
- * Club domestic league appearances and goals

László Kaszás Kaszner (born 18 February 1938) is a former Hungarian football player.

== Career ==
Born in Budapest, Kaszás began playing football with local side Vasas.

At age 17, Kaszás went to Spain to play for Barcelona in 1957. He later signed for Real Madrid, but did not play any league matches for the club. Next, he signed with La Liga side Racing de Santander in 1960.

A year later, Kaszás joined Serie A side Venezia and spent one season with the club before returning to Spain. Back in Spain, he would play one season in the Segunda División with CD Constancia, followed by two seasons with RCD Espanyol in La Liga. Next, he returned to the second division to play two seasons for UE Lleida.

Kaszás would spend the following two years playing in the United States, in the North American Soccer League with Philadelphia Spartans, Saint Louis Stars and New York Generals. Before retiring, he signed a one-year contract with CD Tarrasa.
