= 2nd Legions' Infantry Division =

Polish 2nd Legions Infantry Division (2. Dywizja Piechoty Legionów) was a tactical unit of the Polish Army between the World Wars. Formed on February 21, 1919, in the towns of Zegrze and Jablonna near Warsaw, and composed mostly of veterans of the Polish Legions in World War I, the unit saw extensive action during the Polish-Bolshevik War and the Invasion of Poland.

During the Polish-Bolshevik War the division was commanded by Henryk Minkiewicz and Michal Zymierski. In a later stage, it took part in the Battle of Niemen as part of the Third Army. In the Second Polish Republic, the unit's headquarters were stationed in Kielce, with some regiments in the garrisons of Sandomierz and Jarosław. During that time its commanders included General Aleksander Narbutt-Łuczyński (1921 - 1930), General Juliusz Zulauf (1930 - 1938) and Colonel Edward Dojan-Surówka (1938 - Sept. 8 1939).

In 1921 - 1939, the division's headquarters was garrisoned in Kielce. Its 2nd Legions' Infantry Regiment was located in Sandomierz, 3rd Legions' Infantry Regiment was located in Jaroslaw, 4th Legions' Infantry Regiment was stationed in Kielce. Other subunits, such as 2nd Light Artillery Regiment, were scattered in different towns of northern Lesser Poland.

== Invasion of Poland ==
During the Invasion of Poland, 2nd Legions Infantry Division was a reserve unit of Army Łódź. Commanded by Colonel Edward Dojan-Surówka, it detrained at Łask and took positions near Zelów. On September 2, 1939, it was sent to Bełchatów, and its elements fought in the Battle of Borowa Góra. In the night of September 8/9, 1939, Colonel Dojan-Surowka suffered a nervous breakdown and abandoned his soldiers. He was replaced by Colonel Antoni Staich. Later, the division took part in the Battle of Wola Cyrusowa, and finally, fought in the Battle of Modlin, capitulating on September 29, 1939. A number of its soldiers were killed by the Germans in the Massacre in Zakroczym.

== Operation Tempest ==
The division was recreated in the spring of 1944 by the Home Army of Kielce - Radom Area, as Second Legions Home Army Infantry Division Pogon. With over 3000 soldiers, and commanded by Colonel Antoni Żółkiewski, it fought in Operation Tempest (summer 1944). The division was dissolved in January 1945.

== Sources ==
- Tadeusz Jurga: Wojsko Polskie : krótki informator historyczny o Wojsku Polskim w latach II wojny światowej. 7, Regularne jednostki Wojska Polskiego w 1939 : organizacja, działania bojowe, uzbrojenie, metryki związków operacyjnych, dywizji i brygad. Warszawa : Wydawnictwo Ministerstwa Obrony Narodowej 1975

== See also ==
- Polish army order of battle in 1939
- Polish contribution to World War II
- List of Polish divisions in World War II
