= 4th Legions' Infantry Regiment =

Full history of the Fourth Polish legions infantry regiment

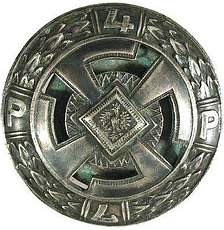
- Badge of the Regiment
- Active: 1915 – November 1917; 1 November 1918 – 29 September 1939
- Country: Austria-Hungary (1914-1917); Poland (1918-1939)
- Role: Infantry
- Garrison/HQ: Piotrków Trybunalski (1914-November 1917); Chrzanów (1 November 1918-February 1919); Lwów (February 1919-March 1920); Kielce (March 1920-1939)
- Engagements: World War I: Brusilov offensive; Battle of Kostiuchnówka; Polish–Ukrainian War: Battle of Lemberg (1918); Polish-Soviet War; World War II: Invasion of Poland; Battle of Westerplatte; Battle of Modlin

Fourth Legions Infantry Regiment (Poland) (Polish: 4 Pulk Piechoty Legionow, 4 pp Leg.) was an infantry regiment of the Polish Legions in World War I (1915–1917) and the Polish Army in 1918–1939. During the interbellum period, it was garrisoned in the city of Kielce, and was part of the 2nd Legions Infantry Division.

The origins of the unit date back to the spring of 1915, when in Piotrków Trybunalski, the 4th Legions Infantry Regiment was formed by officers of the 2nd Brigade, Polish Legions, and a group volunteers, mostly from Austrian Galicia and Congress Poland. The regiment joined the 3rd Brigade, Polish Legions, and in July 1915 was sent to the Eastern Front, to fight against the Imperial Russian Army in the area of Lublin and in Volhynia.

The 4th Legions Infantry Regiment remained on the frontline until the autumn of 1916. Dissolved in November 1917 (see Oath crisis), its soldiers were either interned or sent to the Polish Auxiliary Corps.

On November 1, 1918, in Kraków, General brygady Bolesław Roja ordered Major Edward Szerauc, former commandant of the Third Legions Battalion, to re-create the 4th Legions Infantry Regiment. First regimental order was issued on the next day, and the new unit was formed out of Chrzanów Company of Captain Jazdzynski, together with Reserve Battalion of the 16th Austrian Rifle Regiment from Opava, Czech Silesia.

On November 19, 1918, the regiment sent its first companies to the Polish–Ukrainian War, which took place in eastern part of former Austrian Galicia. These companies took part in the Battle of Lemberg (1918), and for practical purposes, the headquarters of the regiment were in early February 1919 established in Lwów.

The 4th Legions Infantry Regiment fought in the Polish–Soviet War, after which its headquarters were moved to Kielce, where its reserve battalion had already been stationed. Since 1930, the regiment trained recruits for the battalions of the Border Protection Corps. In mid-March-1939, two NCOs and 68 soldiers, under command of Colonel Leon Pajak, were sent to Westerplatte, Free City of Danzig. All soldiers later fought in the Battle of Westerplatte.

During the 1939 Invasion of Poland, the regiment, commanded by Colonel Bronislaw Laliczynski, fought in central Poland, as part of the 2nd Legions Infantry Division, Łódź Army of General Juliusz Rómmel. The 4th Legions Infantry Regiment defended main positions of the division, along the Warta river. After heavy fighting near Konstantynów, the regiment withdrew towards Warsaw. Unable to reach the Polish capital, elements of the regiment managed to get to Modlin, fighting there until the capitulation of the fortress, on September 29.

== Symbols ==
The regiment had four badges, with the first one approved in September 1916. The final badge, used from 1928, featured the swastika with the Polish Eagle and the inscription 4 P P L.

== Commandants ==
- Colonel Bolesław Roja (18 III 1915 – 15 IX 1917),
- Major Edward Szerauc (2 XI 1918 – 17 I 1919 )
- Colonel Juliusz Zulauf (18 I – 24 VII 1919)
- Captain Florian Smykal (25 VII – 16 X 1919)
- Major Mieczysław Smorawiński (17 X 1919 – 5 VIII 1920)
- Major Florian Smykal (od 6 VIII 1920 – 30 VIII 1921)
- Colonel Stefan Jazdzynski (1 IX 1921 – 31 III 1930)
- Colonel Zygmunt Jerzy Kuczynski (31 III 1930 – 20 IX 1931)
- Colonel Boleslaw Ostrowski (15 IX 1931 – 1 II 1937)
- Colonel Zygmunt Berling (27 II 1937 – 20 III 1939)
- Colonel Bronislaw Laliczynski (20 III – IX 1939).

== Sources ==
- Kazimierz Satora: Opowieści wrześniowych sztandarów. Warszawa: Instytut Wydawniczy Pax, 1990
- Jerzy Osiecki, Stanisław Wyrzycki "4 Pułk Piechoty Legionów", Kielce 2007, Agencja "JP" s.c

== See also ==
- 1939 Infantry Regiment (Poland)
