= Józef Adam Lasocki =

Polish general

Józef Adam Feliks Bronisław Lasocki (1861–1931) was an officer in the Austro-Hungarian Army.

During the First World War, he commanded formations from regiment to division in size.

From December 1918, he was a general in the Polish Army during the Polish-Soviet War. In 1919, he commanded 2 BJ, Grupa Zaniemenska, 1 and 2 DLB and 8 DP. In 1920, he stopped the Russian forces from crossing Vistula River to his area of operations. He retired in 1921.

== Sources ==
- Janusz Odziemkowski, Leksykon Wojny Polsko-Rosyjskiej 1919-1920, Oficyna Wydawnica RYTM, 2004, ISBN 83-7399-096-8, p. 220
