= Ożarów (disambiguation) =

Ożarów may refer to the following places:

- Ożarów, Łódź Voivodeship (central Poland)
- Ożarów, Lublin Voivodeship (east Poland)
- Ożarów in Świętokrzyskie Voivodeship (south-central Poland)
- Ożarów, Masovian Voivodeship (east-central Poland)
