= About the Golden-Haired Boy =

Polish fairy tale about a helpful horse

About the Golden-Haired Boy (Polish: O chłopcu złotowłosym) is a Polish fairy tale first collected by ethnographer Karol Mátyás. It is classified in the international Aarne-Thompson-Uther Index as ATU 314, "Goldener". It deals with a friendship between a king's son and a magic horse that are forced to flee for their lives due to the boy's own mother, and reach another kingdom, where the boy adopts another identity.

Although it differs from variants wherein a hero acquires golden hair, its starting sequence (persecution by the hero's own mother) is considered by scholarship as an alternate opening to the same tale type.

== Sources ==
The tale was originally published by folklorist Karol Mátyás in magazine Wisła. Polish folklorist Julian Krzyżanowski sourced it from Kraków.

== Summary ==
In this tale, a woman has a son and begins an affair while her husband is away, so she decides to kill her own son to hide the affair. The boy has a magic pet horse, a small pony he talks to when he goes to school, and one day the horse warns the boy about his mother's deadly plot: first, it warns that his mother plans to poison his food, so he is to avoid the meal altogether. The boy does as the pony instructs, but his father's favourite dog eats the poisoned meal eats it and dies, to the boy's relief and the mother's disappointment. The next day, the pony warns the boy his mother will insist he takes a bath, but he is to throw some clothes on the bath his mother prepared for him. The boy pretends to have a fever and goes to fulfill the pony's request: just as he tosses the clothes in the bathtub, the water destroys them. The boy's mother, to save face, chastises her son for ruining his clothes. Thirdly, the horse warns the boy his mother set the bed for him in a way that will prickle him to death, so he is to avoid sleeping on the bed and toss the cat on it. It happens thus, and the cat is torn to pieces.

While the boy is at school the other day, his mother writes a "telegraph" to her husband, spinning a false story that their son is training to be a bandit, so he killed their dog and their cat and destroyed his own clothes. The boy's father believes in the lie and orders his son to be executed. As soon as the boy returns from the school his pet horse rushes to warn him they plan to execute him, so the pony will ride away with the boy and he will reveal the whole truth to the people; the horse will even remind him if he misses any detail. The boy's father comes back and is ready to kill his son, to his wife's delight, whose crimes will not be discovered. However, the boy takes off a wig from his head, revealing his golden hair, rises with his horse in the air and tells his father everything his mother did to him. The horse begins to talk and confirms everything, then suggests the woman is drawn and quartered. It happens thus, and the boy's father asks for his son to return home, but he decides to depart.

The golden-haired boy rides away with the horse to the forest, where he puts on a bearskin, as the animal advised him to do. Nearby, there is a large manor where three daughters live, and the boy sneaks in the garden and to the gardener's quarters. He hides under the stove, but is found by the gardener, who takes him in as his assistant. The boy helps the gardener prepare three bouquets for the sisters, and ties a strand of his golden hair to the third bouquet, which he gives to the youngest sister. The girl notices the golden hair and inquires the gardener about it, but he says he does not know of its source.

Later, the girls go to church on Sunday, when a richly dressed man with golden hair appears. The youngest sister realizes the golden hair came from him. The golden-haired man, who is the gardener's assistant, also notices her, then rushes back to his lowly disguise at the cave, by putting on the bearskin and resting under a tree in the garden. However, he forgets about covering his own hair, and the girl is just beside him. The girl asks why he always wears the bearskin, and he jokes he can take it off, but the girl refrains him from doing so, for fear of anyone finding him. The girl returns home and finds some suitors aiming for her hand, but she made her choice: the boy in bearskin. Her mother is furious with her decision, and states she will have no dowry, but the girl dismisses it. Still, their father marries them off, while the elder sisters marry their respective husbands with larger dowries.

The boy in bearskin spends his days hunting. One day, on Christmas, his two brothers-in-law are hunting, but cannot find any game, when they spot their brother-in-law surrounded by hares and deer. The brothers-in-law ask for him to sell some of his game, and a deal is made: some of the game, in exchange for branding the face of one of the men with a heated horseshoe. The next time, the brothers-in-law find him again and ask him for some game, and he agrees to give them, in exchange for branding his nose with a cwancygiera ("zwanzieger", a type of silver coin). He returns home to his wife and rests for a bit, after a hurt leg, when a maidservant of his parents-in-law come with a letter to invite them for a meal at the main house. The maidservant notices the place is humble, but beautiful. Still, the couple refuse their invitation. Some time later, the girl's mother goes to talk to her daughter and compliments her decision to marry the lowborn boy, for the other two sons-in-law have been branded by a person the woods. The girl tells her mother her husband is asleep, and shows her the horseshoe and the cwancygiera.

== Analysis ==
=== Tale type ===
Polish philologist and folklorist Julian Krzyżanowski, establisher of the Polish Folktale Catalogue according to the international index, classified the tale as Polish type 314, Zaczarowany koń ("Enchanted Horse"). The Polish type corresponds, in the international Aarne-Thompson-Uther Index, to tale type ATU 314, "The Goldener": a youth with golden hair works as the king's gardener. The type may also open with the prince for some reason being the servant of an evil being, where he gains the same gifts, and the tale proceeds as in this variant.

==== Introductory episodes ====
Scholarship notes three different opening episodes to the tale type: (1) the hero becomes a magician's servant and is forbidden to open a certain door, but he does and dips his hair in a pool of gold; (2) the hero is persecuted by his stepmother, but his loyal horse warns him and later they both flee; (3) the hero is given to the magician as payment for the magician's help with his parents' infertility problem. Folklorist Christine Goldberg, in Enzyklopädie des Märchens, related the second opening to former tale type AaTh 532, "The Helpful Horse (I Don't Know)", wherein the hero is persecuted by his stepmother and flees from home with his horse. (Note: According to Stith Thompson's 1961 revision of the index, in type 532 the hero's helpful horse advises him to answer every question with the sentence "I don't know".)

American folklorist Barre Toelken recognized the spread of the tale type across Northern, Eastern and Southern Europe, but identified three subtypes: one that appears in Europe (Subtype 1), wherein the protagonist becomes the servant to a magical person, finds the talking horse and discovers his benefactor's true evil nature, and acquires a golden colour on some part of his body; a second narrative (Subtype 3), found in Greece, Turkey, Caucasus, Uzbekistan and Northern India, where the protagonist is born through the use of a magical fruit; and a third one (Subtype 2). According to Toelken, this Subtype 2 is "the oldest", being found "in Southern Siberia, Iran, the Arabian countries, Mediterranean, Hungary and Poland". In this subtype, the hero (who may be a prince) and the foal are born at the same time and become friends, but their lives are at stake when the hero's mother asks for the horse's vital organ (or tries to kill the boy to hide her affair), which motivates their flight from their homeland to another kingdom.

=== Motifs ===
Professor Anna Birgitta Rooth stated that the motif of the stepmother's persecution of the hero appears in tale type 314 in variants from Slavonic, Eastern European and Near Eastern regions. She also connected this motif to part of the Cinderella cycle, in a variation involving a male hero and his cow.

==== The suitor selection test ====
The motif of the princess throwing an apple to her suitor is indexed as motif H316, "Suitor test: apple thrown indicates princess' choice (often golden apple)". According to mythologist Yuri Berezkin and other Russian researchers, the motif is "popular" in Iran, and is also attested "in Central Europe, the Balkans, the Caucasus, the Near East, and Central Asia".

According to Turkologist Karl Reichl, types ATU 314 and ATU 502 contain this motif: the princess chooses her own husband (of lowly appearance) in a gathering of potential suitors, by giving him an object (e.g., an apple). However, he also remarks that the motif is "spread in folk literature" and may appear in other tale types.

Germanist Günter Dammann, in Enzyklopädie des Märchens, argued that Subtype 2 (see above) represented the oldest form of the Goldener narrative, since the golden apple motif in the suitor selection roughly appears in the geographic distribution of the same subtype.

==== The gardener hero ====
According to Richard MacGillivray Dawkins, in the tale type, the hero as gardener destroys and restores the garden after he finds work, and, later, fights in the war. During the battle, he is injured, and the king dresses his wound with a kerchief, which will serve as token of recognition.

==== Branding the brothers-in-law ====
According to German scholars Günther Damman and Kurt Ranke, another motif that appears in tale type ATU 314 is the hero branding his brothers-in-law during their hunt. Likewise, Ranke stated that the hero's branding represented a mark of his ownership over his brothers-in-law.

Ranke located the motif in the Orient and in the Mediterranean. In the same vein, Hungarian professor Ákos Dömötör, in the notes to tale type ATU 314 in the Hungarian National Catalogue of Folktales (MNK), remarked that the motif was a "reflection of the Eastern legal custom", which also appears in the Turkic epic Alpamysh.

== Variants ==
=== About the Royal Son ===
In a Polish tale collected by Polish folklorist Aleksander Saloni with the title O synie króleskiem (Russian: О королевском сыне; English: "About the Royal Son"), while a king is away at war, a magician named Milojardyn turns the true queen into a mare and replaces her for his daughter. When the king comes back, the false queen conspires with the king to kill the prince. The boy comes back from school and goes to the stables to feed the mare, which tramples him and warns him against eating soup or sweets his "mother" may give him. The next time, they try to poison him with sweets again, and the third time with a special coat rigged to kill whoever wears it. Finally, the false queen scratches herself and blames the prince, which convinces the king to execute his son. The mare advises the boy to ask for a last ride on the horse before his execution, then he must gallop away from the kingdom. It happens thus, and the prince and mare ride away to another realm. The mare gives the prince a girdle to summon her and orders him to find work as a gardener, then flees. The prince hides his golden hair and astral mark on his chest, then hires himself to the king's gardener as an apprentice. One day, he prepares a bouquet of flowers and gives it to the youngest princess, who reciprocates by giving him her ring. Later, the second king arranges marriages for his three daughters, but the youngest princess only wants to marry the gardener. The prince summons the mare, wears an ugly disguise and goes to the king's court, where he is given the princess. Some time later, some princes, spurned by the princess, ally themselves and prepare to battle the kingdom. The third princess complains to her gardener husband, who agrees to fight for his father-in-law against the enemy princes. After two battles, the prince and the mare defeat the enemy princes and save the king, but he is hurt in a leg. The king bandages the mysterious knight with a handkerchief, but he departs back to the princess. Safely at home, the king sends for his third daughter and her husband, but, since they deny his orders, he goes to the gardener's quarters himself and, upon seeing the same bandage on the gardener's apprentice, realizes his son-in-law was the one that saved him. The gardener goes to the court and summons the mare with the bridle, which turns back into his mother, the true queen. Julian Krzyżanowski sourced the tale from Łańcut.

=== About Two Apples ===
In a Polish tale collected by Oskar Kolberg from Tomaszowice with the title O dwóch jabłkach (German: Die zwei Äpfel; English: "About Two Apples"), a childless couple prays to God to have a child. One night, the husband has a dream about an apple tree behind the stables. The next morning, the man finds the tree from his dream and plucks two apples, then goes to feed the horses, but a fruit falls to the ground and lands near a mare that eats it. The man returns with the other apple and gives it to his wife. A son is born to the couple and a colt to the mare. Seven years later, the boy goes to school, and whenever he goes back home he meets the apple-born colt instead of his mother, which greatly infuriates the latter, so much so she tries to kill her own son: first, she gives him poisoned food. The boy goes to check on the colt and finds him crying. The animal explains his own mother is trying to poison him, and he must toss the food away in a dung heap. The boy follows the animal's orders and buries the food; three days later, snakes and lizards appear in the dung heap. The boy then tells his father about his mother's attempt, and he allows the boy to leave and take the colt with him to the wide world. The boy rides the horse until he reaches a rock, which opens up for them to rest inside. The colt then tells the boy to wash his hair in the fountain; it turns to a golden colour. The colt advises the boy to hide his hair under a cap and go to the nearby castle to find a job as their gardener. The boy makes great bouquets for the king's three daughters, the youngest princess getting the most beautiful, to her sisters' envy. One day, the king sends the gardener to meet the queen, and he exposes his golden hair, which the youngest princess sees. Later, the king organizes a ball and summons princes for his daughters to choose. During the ball, the princesses choose their husbands, the youngest choosing the gardener.

=== About the Scabby-Headed and his Little Horse ===
Polish ethnographer Stanisław Ciszewski collected a Polish tale from Skala, with the title O Parszywej główce i jego koniku ("About Scabby-Headed and his little horse"). In this story, a king's wife gives birth to a boy with a scabby head, while a mare foals in the stables to a scabby colt. The boy goes to talk to the colt after school. One day, the colt tells the boy the queen has died, and his father, the king, wants to remarry. Later, the king's new wife wants to kill the prince, and tries to poison his food, but the prince's colt warns him to avoid the food and eat the safest dish. Failing her attempts, the queen asks the king to kill her stepson, but the colt warns him they plan to kill him, so he should take three shots for his father's health, his mother's, and his own. They shoot him, but the colt flies away with the boy to another land, while they let the queen believe her stepson has died. They land on another country and wash their hairs in water, gilding it. They are captured by a princess, but the colt makes an exit through the wall and both gallop away. They make their escape after a third border, leaving the princess behind, and reach yet another land, where the Scabby-Headed prince learns the local king will marry his daughter to whoever can jump over a large pit. The Scabby-Headed prince jumps and wins the princess for himself, but the king moves them out to a separate room. Due to this, foreign suitors learns of the princess's marriage and declare war on the king. The Scabby-Headed prince asks his wife to help her father, but she says he cannot help him. Still, the Scabby-Headed prince joins in the fray to protect his father-in-law's kingdom, and he is shot in the leg by a bullet. The king dresses his wound with a kerchief, and the prince returns home to his wife to rest. The princess notices her father's kerchief on her husband's leg and calls for her father. The king tells his daughter a golden-haired prince on a golden-maned horse helped him in the war, so he cannot be his lowborn son-in-law. The princess replies that she will bring the evidence from her house. The prince washes his head and the horse with water, which turns his own hair to golden colour and the horse's mane to gold, then rides the horse to meet the king. The prince introduces himself and tells his lifestory, including the bit about his stepmother. At the end of the tale, the prince's stepmother is punished by being drawn and quartered. Julian Krzyżanowski sourced the tale from Ojców Skała.

== See also ==
- The Black Colt
- The Wonderful Sea-Horse
- The Story of the Prince and His Horse
- The Stallion Houssan
- The Tale of Clever Hasan and the Talking Horse
- Adventures of a Boy
- The Prince and the Foal
