= Lanterns of the Dead =

Architectural name for type of small stone towers

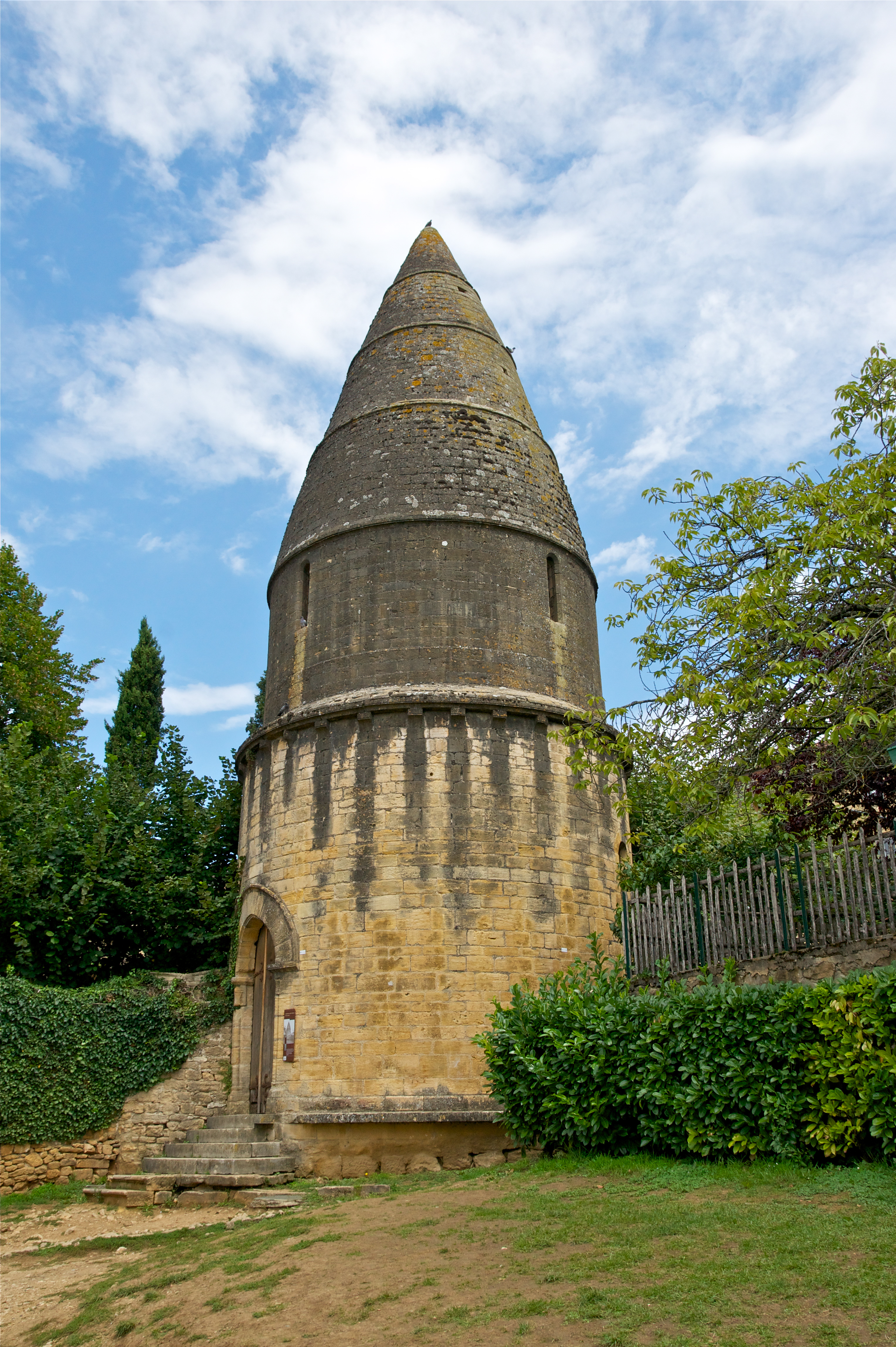
Lantern of the Dead in Sarlat-la-Caneda, France

Lanterns of the Dead (French: Lanternes des morts; Polish: Latarnia umarłych) are small stone towers found chiefly in Austria, France, Germany, Northern Italy, and Poland where it is associated with Latin Christendom.

== Function ==
Pierced with small openings at the top, a light was exhibited at night to indicate the position of a cemetery, hospital, or leper colony. These lanterns were originally constructed to warn passers-by of the danger of infection, as well as to illuminate cemeteries where it was feared that repenting souls, ghosts, and criminals could hide. Later, they were also erected at the intersections of important routes and roads.

== France ==
These towers were usually circular, with a small entrance in the lower part giving access to the interior, so as to raise the lamps by a pulley to the required height. One of the most perfect in France is that at Cellefrouin (Charente), which consists of a series of eight attached semicircular shafts, raised on a pedestal, and is crowned with a conical roof decorated with fir cones; it has only one aperture, towards the main road. Other examples exist at Ciron (Indre) and Antigny (Vienne).

== Poland ==
Lanterns of the dead can be found all over Poland. Some of the more well-known examples can be found in Kielce, Wrocław, and Kraków. A tradition which is most strongly associated with the Middle Ages, a new lantern of the dead constructed in the Romanesque style was completed in 2021 near Lublin in Dębowka. A custom of Roman Catholicism which has fallen out of fashion, the new lantern is the first such construction to be built in Europe in centuries.

A significant number of structures which were built as lanterns of the dead still exist in Kraków. Many of them have been either rebuilt or rearranged in the centuries since their original construction. Most of them now serve as either shrines or chapels, with the top opening, where light sources such as lamps, oil lamps, or torches, were placed having been walled up in the succeeding centuries. They have also been altered with the addition of statuary depicting saints of the Roman Catholic Church.

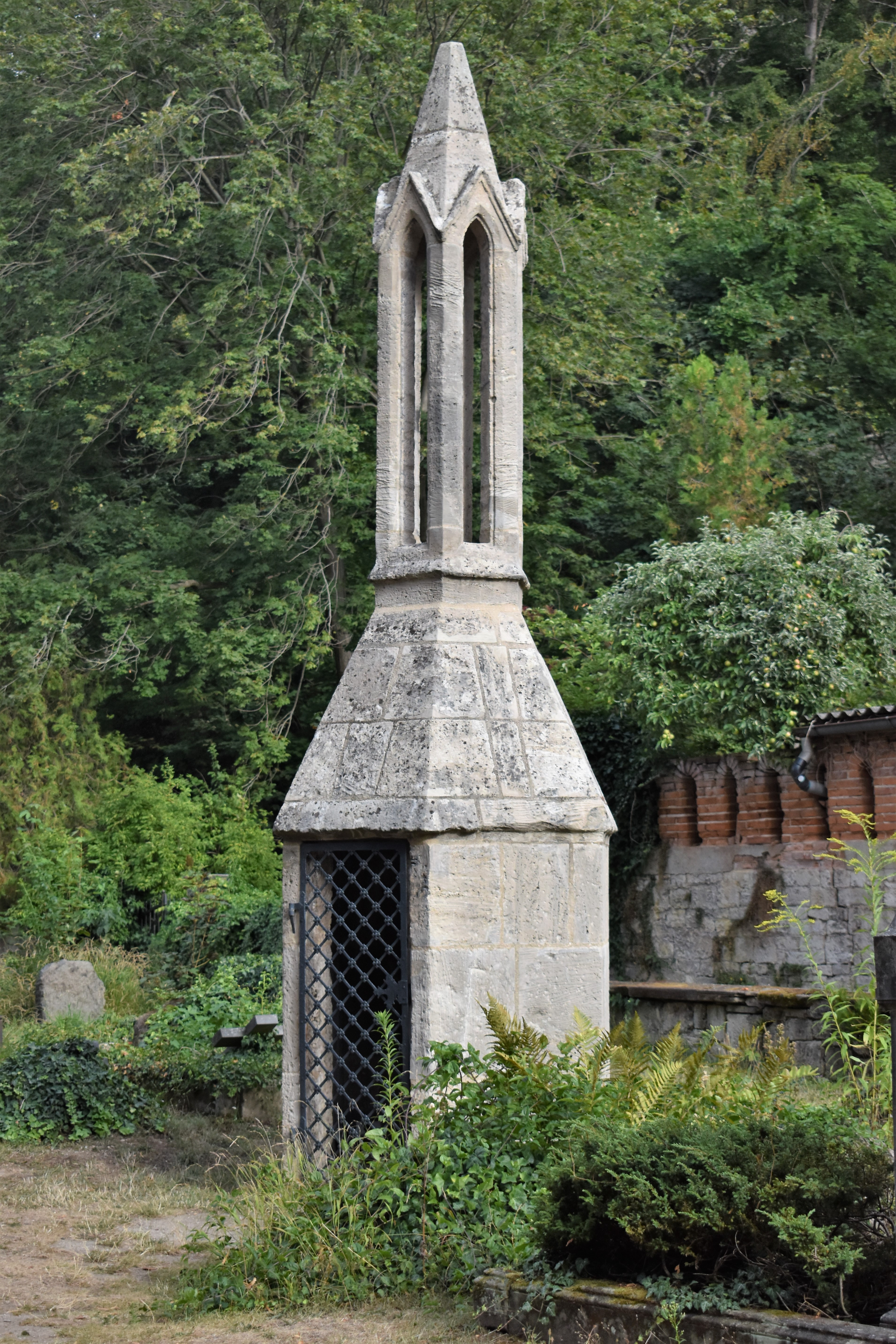
Lantern of the Dead in Schulpforte, Germany

== Germany ==
In Germany, lanterns of the dead had been known since the 13th century, especially in southern and southwestern parts of the country. In addition to columns with lantern-like attachments, funerary lanterns were also found on buttresses of churches. In the 16th century, the lanterns gradually fell into disuse. However, the custom lives on in the grave candles that are still placed today, for example, on All Souls' Day.

== England ==
There is one surviving example in England, in the churchyard at Bisley, Gloucestershire, which is referred to as the Poor Souls' Light.

== Misconceptions ==
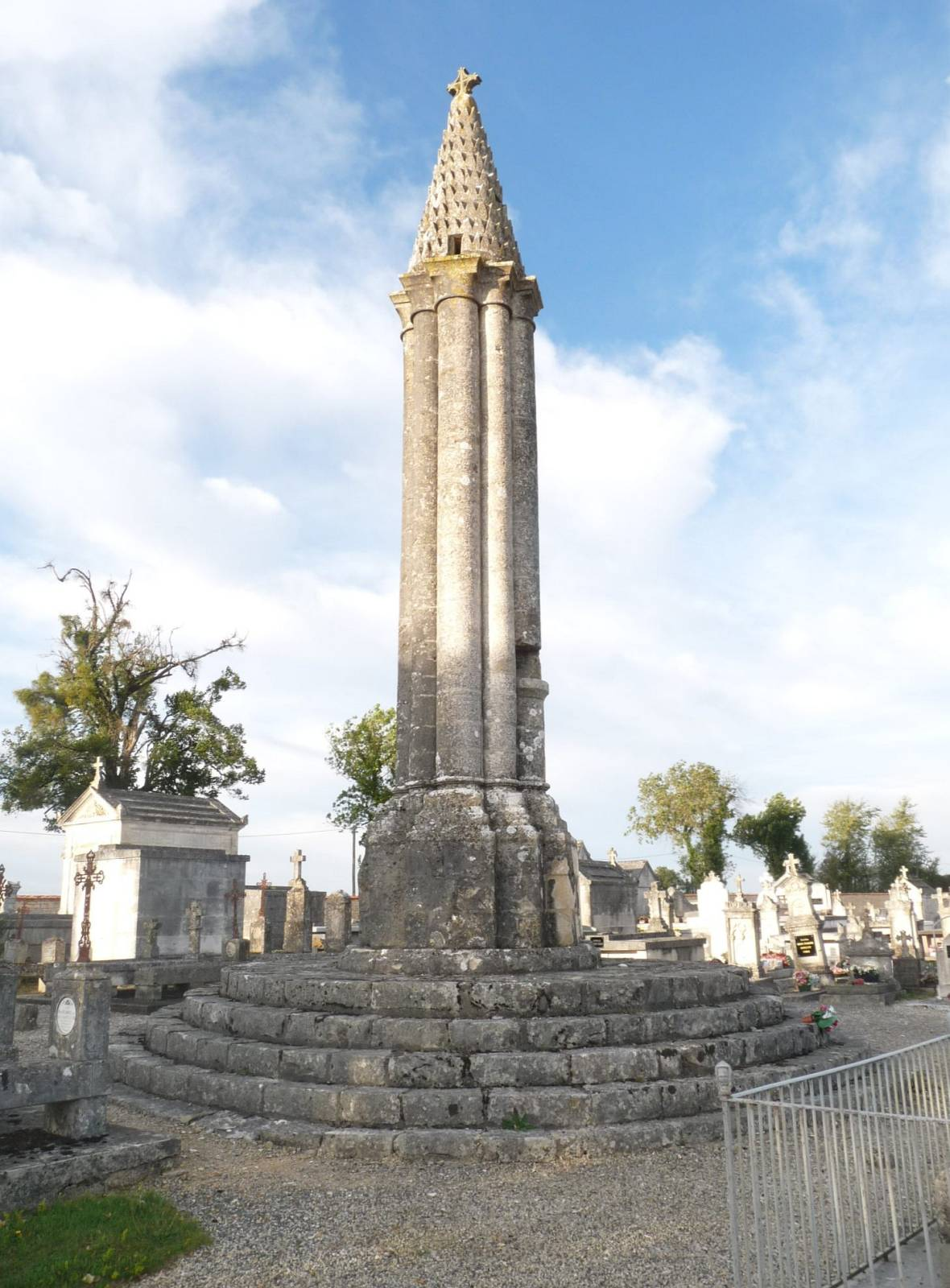
Lantern of the Dead at Cellefrouin

The origin and use of such lanterns are controversial. Some of those lanterns are said to be "lanterns of the Moors" instead of "lanterns of the Dead". The unstandardized spellings of the French language of the past can easily explain this folk etymology: in French, "the Moors" (les Maures) and "the dead" (les morts) are near-homophones. Moreover, some of those lanterns do not indicate any cemetery and their architecture has strong oriental influences. The proximity of Al-Andalus, Crusaders coming back to France, or trade in the Mediterranean may explain such monuments. For instance, the "lantern of the Moors" in Vergèze, southern France, looks like the chimneys of the Bakhchisaray Palace, the Palace of the Crimean Tatars in Crimea, and doesn't indicate any cemetery. Actually, its other name is indeed the "Saracen chimney". The "lantern of the Dead" of Carlux, Southern France, is called a "Saracen chimney" too. Another example is the "lantern of the Moors" in Sarlat-la-Canéda, in Southern France too. The origin of the lantern is linked with the abbot Bernard of Clairvaux, who played a major role in the Second Crusade. It is said to have been built after a visit of the abbot in the city, in 1147, possibly by Knights Templar as would prove a sculpture on the tower representing a horse and two Crosses pattée.

Besides, "Saracen chimneys" (Cheminées sarrasines) are a typical local architecture feature of Bresse, a region in Eastern France. It seems to bear the same name only coincidentally. And the origin of the name remains a mystery in that case too. Various fanciful origins exist for those who introduced this tradition, such as: survivors from the Battle of Tours (during which Charles Martel fought the Saracens in 732, 350 km and many centuries away), refugees from the Balkans fleeing the Ottoman Turks in the 15th century after the Fall of Constantinople, Burgundians settling in Bresse in the 5th-6th century and carrying with them Nordic-style chimneys, or monk-soldiers of the 12th century. Last given explanation, "Saracen", or "Arab" also meant "apocryphal" in the 19th century.
