= Moszna =

Moszna may refer to two villages in Poland:

- Moszna, Lublin Voivodeship (east Poland)
- Moszna, Opole Voivodeship (south-west Poland; famous for its castle)
