= Wysokie =

Wysokie may refer to the following places in Poland:

- Wysokie, Lower Silesian Voivodeship (south-west Poland)
- Wysokie, Gmina Międzyrzec Podlaski, Biała County in Lublin Voivodeship (east Poland)
- Wysokie, Hrubieszów County in Lublin Voivodeship (east Poland)
- Wysokie, Gmina Jastków in Lublin Voivodeship (east Poland)
- Wysokie, Sokółka County in Podlaskie Voivodeship (north-east Poland)
- Wysokie, Gmina Raczki in Podlaskie Voivodeship (north-east Poland)
- Wysokie, Gmina Wiżajny in Podlaskie Voivodeship (north-east Poland)
- Wysokie Duże, Gmina Stawiski in Podlaskie Voivodeship (north-east Poland)
- Wysokie, Gmina Wysokie in Lublin Voivodeship (east Poland)
- Wysokie, Lesser Poland Voivodeship (south Poland)
- Wysokie, Zamość County in Lublin Voivodeship (east Poland)
- Wysokie, Greater Poland Voivodeship (west-central Poland)
- Wysokie, Lubusz Voivodeship (west Poland)
- Wysokie, Pomeranian Voivodeship (north Poland)
- Wysokie, Warmian-Masurian Voivodeship (north Poland)
- Wysokie, West Pomeranian Voivodeship (north-west Poland)

Wysokie may also refer to the former Polish name for the village of Vysoke in Ternopil Oblast, Ukraine
