= Adam Solski =

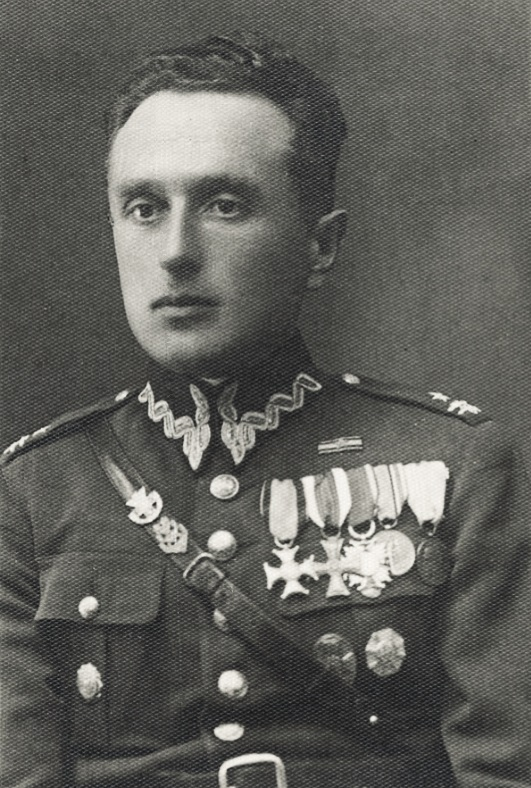
- Adam Solski
- Born: January 4, 1895
- Died: April 9, 1940 (aged 45); Katyn
- Spouse: Anna Leontyna née Trojanowska
- Children: Ewa
- Military career
- Allegiance: Polish
- Branch: Polish Legions of World War I
- Rank: Major
- Unit: 57th Infantry Regiment

Adam Solski (January 4, 1895 – April 9, 1940) was a soldier of the Polish Legions of World War I, a participant in the Polish–Soviet War, and a major in the Polish Army in the interwar period. Solski fought in the 1939 Invasion of Poland. Captured by the Red Army during the Soviet invasion of Poland, he was murdered in the Katyn massacre, on April 9, 1940.

== Early life ==
Solski attended high school in Lwow. In February 1913 he joined the local Sokol Organization, and soon afterwards attended military courses at Bolechów (Bolekhiv, Ukraine). In August 1914 he volunteered for the Eastern Legion, and from 1916 he served in the 3rd Brigade, Polish Legions.

== Polish Army ==
In November 1918 Solski joined the newly created Polish Army and fought in the Polish-Soviet war of 1920, in which he was an officer in the headquarters of 9th Infantry Division. On July 1, 1923 Solski was promoted to captain. At that time, he was serving in the 35th Infantry Regiment, stationed in Brest. On January 1, 1932, he became a major of the 57th Infantry Regiment, stationed in Poznań. In summer 1939, Solski was mobilized to the Reserve Center of 14th Infantry Division, with which he fought in the German invasion of Poland. In late September 1939, Solski was captured by the Red Army while attempting to escape occupied Kresy and flee to Hungary. He was first sent to a POW camp at Putyvl, but later the NKVD transferred him to Kozelsk.

== Katyn Massacre ==
In spring 1940, Solski was taken to Katyn Forest, where he was murdered by the Soviets on April 9, 1940, in what is known as the Katyn massacre. He was buried in a mass grave, and in 1943 his body, marked with number 490, was exhumed by German investigators. Next to Solski’s body were two notebooks, a vaccination card, two Miraculous Medals, a bill and a referral to a doctor.

While in Soviet POW camps, Solski wrote a secret diary. It was found by Germans in 1943 and published by Józef Mackiewicz. After the war, its contents were read to Polish listeners by Radio Free Europe. His diary, which was kept until very last moment before the execution, is regarded as one of the most accurate records of life as a prisoner of war of the Soviets, as he described everyday events at the camps. Solski stayed at Kozelsk together with his brother, Captain Kazimierz Solski who was also murdered by the Soviets, on April 17, 1940.

The last entry in the diary is dated April 9, 1940: "Five a.m. From the very morning the day began in an unusual way. We are taken somewhere in a prison ambulance (terrible!) We were brought to a forest, to a location that resembles a summer resort. Here, we are carefully checked. My watch was taken away from me at 6:30 in the morning. They asked me about my ring, which (....) They took away my roubles, belt and pocket knife (...)."

Solski was survived by his wife, Anna Leontyna née Trojanowska (1906–1970), whom he married in 1926, and a daughter Ewa, who died in 2010.

== Awards ==
- Silver Cross of the Virtuti Militari V Class (1921)
- Cross of Valour (1920)
- Silver Cross of Merit (1928)

On October 5, 2007, the Polish Minister of National Defence posthumously promoted Solski to Sub-Colonel. In 2009, a commemorative plaque, dedicated to Solski, was unveiled in Katyn near Otwock.

== See also ==
- NKVD prisoner massacres
- Polish Operation of the NKVD (1937–38)
- Soviet repressions of Polish citizens (1939–46)

== Sources ==
- Księga Cmentarna Polskiego Cmentarza Wojennego: Katyń. Rada Ochrony Pamięci Walk i Męczeństwa, 2000
- Lista oficerów Wojska Polskiego z lat 1914-1939. Adam Solski. officersdatabase.appspot.com.
- Józef Mackiewicz, Katyń. Zbrodnia bez sądu i kary, tom I, Warszawa 1997, str. 93–94. ISBN 83-86482-32-X
