= Zofia Rydet =

Polish photographer

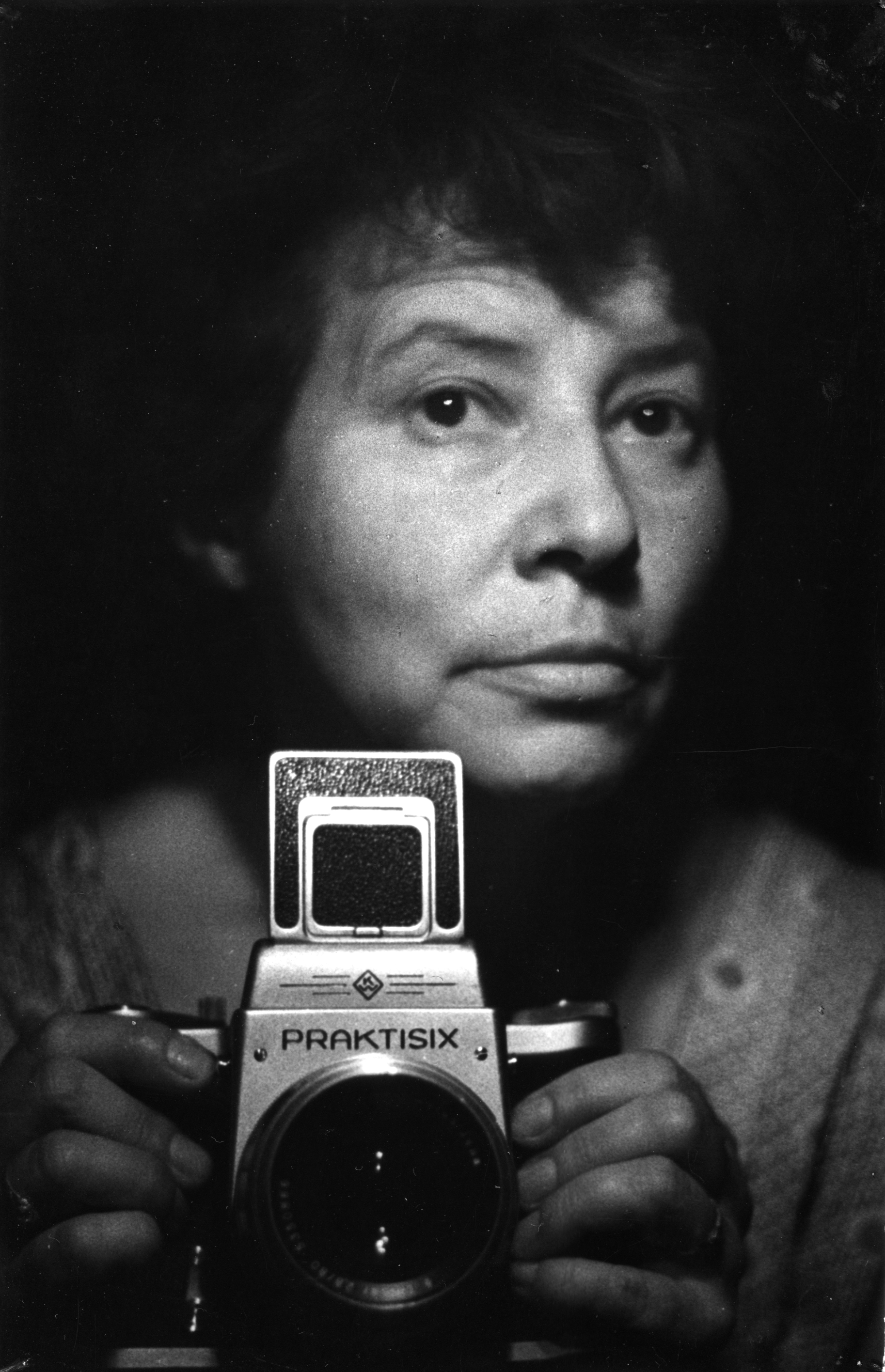
- Zofia Rydet
- Born: May 5, 1911; Stanisławów, Poland
- Died: August 24, 1997 (aged 86); Gliwice, Poland
- Known for: Photography
- Website: www.zofiarydet.com

Zofia Rydet (May 5, 1911 – August 24, 1997) was a Polish photographer, best known for her project "Sociological Record", which aimed to document every household in Poland. She began working on "Sociological Record" in 1978 at the age of 67, and took nearly 20,000 pictures until her death in 1997. Many of the pictures remain undeveloped. The photographs are predominantly portraits of children, men, women, couples, families and the elderly amidst their belongings. Rydet tended to photograph her subjects straight-on, using a wide-angle lens and a flash.

== Early life and education ==
Rydet was born in Stanisławów. She attended the Główna Szkoła Gospodarcza Żeńska in Snopków. As a young woman she had a number of occupations such as working for the Orbis Polish Travel Office and running a stationery shop.

In mid-life she returned to her hobby of photography. She joined the Gliwice Photographic Society in 1954 and improved her skills.

== Work ==
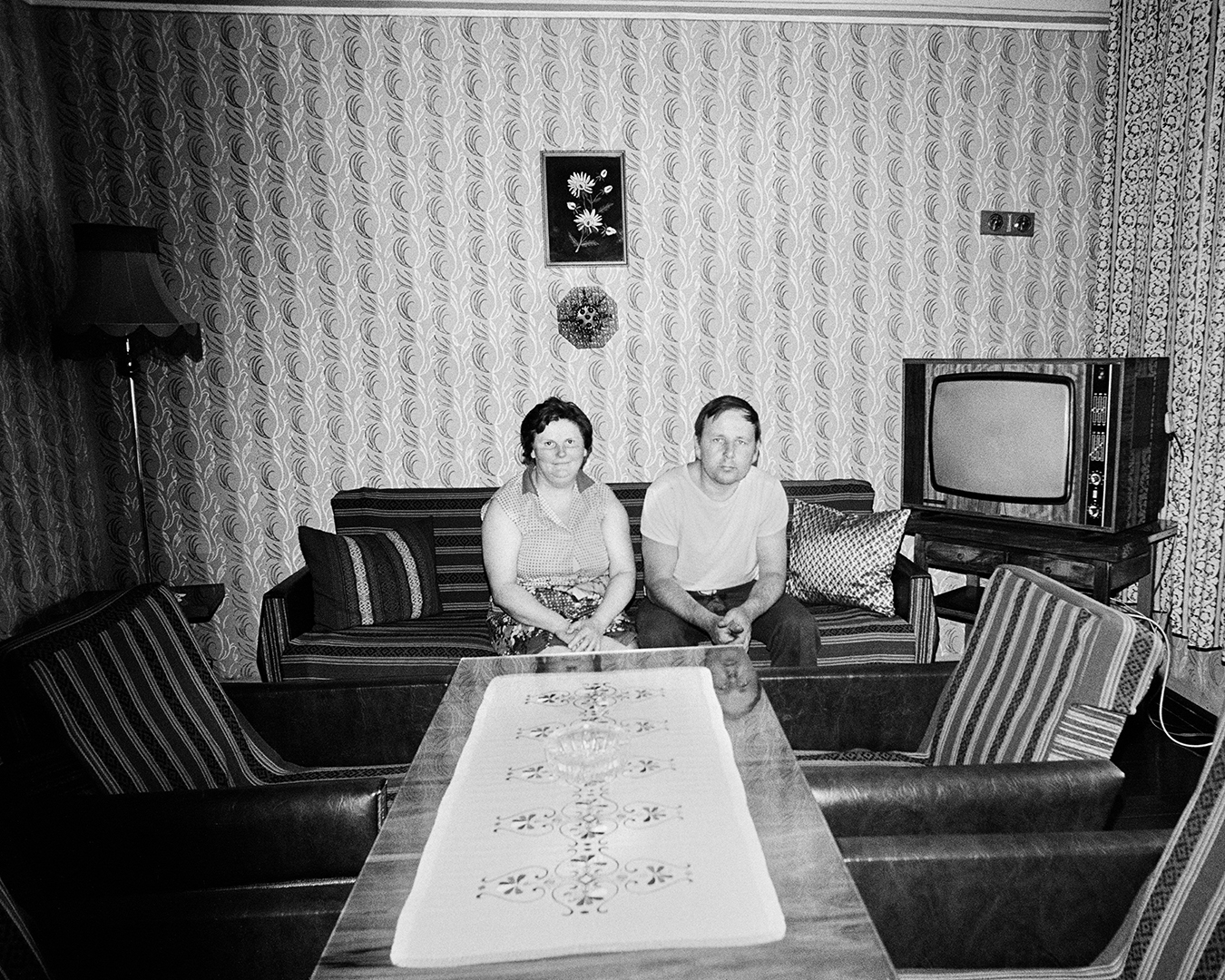
Zofia Rydet, photograph from the series "Sociological Record", 1978, Silesia, Smolnica

In 1961 Rydet had a major exhibition of photographs called Mały człowiek (Little Man). Rydet's intention for Little Man, was to show that children had good and bad experiences in their life, just like adults. She also wanted to depict how societal issues and policies can affect children. Rydet did not want to show children as a carefree stereotype, but rather as human.

In 1965 the works in this exhibition were collected into a book edited by Wojciech Zamecznik. The same year she became a member of the Union of Polish Art Photographers.

In Czas przemijania (The Passage of Time, 1963-1977), Rydet portrays the dignity and grace of old age in a series of intimate portraits. In 1976, Rydet was awarded the Excellence de la Fédération Internationale de l´Art Photographique (EFIAP).

In 1978, Rydet began her work on "Zapis Socjologiczny" ("Sociological Record"). The project consists of thousands of informal black and white photographs taken in ordinary households throughout Poland, particularly from the regions of Podhale, Upper Silesia and the Suwałki area.

During the final years of her life, because she was too weak to travel with her camera, Rydet turned to photographic collage as a medium, and modified her photographs by cutting them up and adding buttons, fabric, and dried flowers.

Rydet died in Gliwice on August 24, 1997.

== Legacy ==
Rydet's first major exhibition of her Sociological Record took place in 2015 at the Museum of Modern Art, Warsaw, and the Jeu de Paume, Château de Tours.

== Collections ==
Rydet's work is held in the following permanent collections:

- Museum of Modern Art, New York
- Art Institute of Chicago
- Centre Georges Pompidou, Paris
- National Museum of Modern Art, Kyoto

== Bibliography ==
- Adam Mazur, 'Zofia Rydet, "Zapis, 1978-1990"', Szum : sztuka polska w rozszerzonym polu. Nr 11 (2015/2016), s. 159-161.
- Barbara Panek-Sarnowska, Socjologiczność fotografii Zofii Rydet, Zielona Góra : Lubuskie Towarzystwo Fiotograficzne, 2005. ISBN 8391578674
- Centre régional de la photographie Nord-Pas-de-Calais, Aspects de la photographie polonaise : Stanislaw Michalski, Zofia Rydet, Maciej Plewinski, Wojciech Prazmowski. Douchy-les-Mines : Centre régional de la photographie Nord Pas-de-Calais, [1988?] ISBN 2904538135
- Krzysztof Jurecki; Elżbieta Fuchs; Katarzyna Bilicka; Alina Kwiatkowska; Joanna Holzman; Muzeum Sztuki (Łódź), Zofia Rydet (1911-1997) : fotografie : Muzeum Sztuki w Łodzi, 2 czerwca 1999 - 31 lipca 1999, Łódź : Muzeum Sztuki; 1999. ISBN 838793707X
- Marcin Łakomski; Anda MacBride; Krzysztof Pijarski; Muzeum Sztuki Nowoczesnej (Warszawa), Object lessons : Zofia Rydet's "Sociological record", Warsaw : Museum of Modern Art, 2017. ISBN 9788364177378
- Stefan Czyżewski; Mariusz Gołąb; Uniwersytet Łódzki. Wydawnictwo, Zofia Rydet po latach, 1978-2018, Łódź : Wydawnictwo Uniwersytetu Łódzkiego, 2020. ISBN 9788381426282, 9788381429498
- Zofia Rydet, Julia Staniszewska, Kryzsztof Kościuczuk, Galeria Asymetria (Warszawa), Zofia Rydet / Julia Staniszewska : mały człowiek - oczekiwanie, Warszawa : Fundacja Archeologia Fotografii, 2011. ISBN 9788392886273
- Zofia Rydet, Wojciech Nowicki, Muzeum w Gliwicach, Zofia Rydet : Zapis socjologiczny 1978-1990, Gliwice : Muzeum w Gliwicach, [2017]. ISBN 9788389856913
