= Smugi, Lublin Voivodeship =

Smugi
- Village
- Location within Poland
- Coordinates: 51°19′N 22°31′E
- Country: Poland
- Voivodeship: Lublin
- County: Lublin
- Gmina: Jastków

Smugi [ˈsmuɡi] is a village in the administrative district of Gmina Jastków, within Lublin County, Lublin Voivodeship, in eastern Poland.

== History ==
Four Polish citizens were murdered by Nazi Germany in the village during World War II.
