= Moszna-Kolonia =

- Village
- Location within Poland
- Coordinates: 51°17′03″N 22°19′56″E
- Country: Poland
- Voivodeship: Lublin
- County: Lublin
- Gmina: Jastków

Moszna-Kolonia [ˈmɔʂna kɔˈlɔɲa] is a village in the administrative district of Gmina Jastków, within Lublin County, Lublin Voivodeship, in eastern Poland.
