= Stefan Garwatowski =

Polish painter (1931–2019)

"Piłsudski in the trenches of Kostiuchnówka". Canvas by Stefan Garwatowski.

Stefan Adam Garwatowski or Gerwatowski ( 1931 - 20 December 2019) was a Polish painter. He was an alumnus of Academy of Fine Arts in Warsaw (1956).

He has authored many paintings illustrating notable events from Poland's military history (as illustrated by a sample painting used here, "Piłsudski in the trenches of Kostiuchnówka"). They are featured in several museums of Poland, including Museum of the Polish Army in Warsaw and the National Museum in Wrocław (Muzeum Narodowe we Wrocławiu). In addition to military paintings, he has also done works in other themes, including abstract art.

== Works ==
They include:

- battle of Kostiuchnówka with the "Piłsudski in the trenches of Kostiuchnówka" (Polish: Piłsudski w okopach pod Kostiuchnówką), featured in the Museum of the Polish Army (MWP) in Warsaw (portrayed above).
- battle of Westerplatte with "Westerplatte" (1996), featured in the MWP
- death of Ignacy Skorupka in the battle of Ossów, with the "Death of rev. Skorupka" (Polish: Śmierć ks. Skorupki) featured in the MWP during the special exhibition for an anniversary of the battle of Warsaw
- battle of Monte Cassino with "Hill 593 - Monte Cassino" (Polish: Wzgórze 593 - Monte Cassino)
- Polish participation in the battle of Berlin, with "We in Berlin" (Polish: My w Berlinie), featured on the web pages of the MWP
- "battle of Grunwald" (Polish: Bitwa pod Grunwaldem)
- "Warsaw Uprising", (Polish: Powstanie Warszawskie)
- "Occupation" (Polish: Okupacja, 1955), Lubusz Land Museum (Muzeum Ziemi Lubuskiej) in Zielona Góra
- battle of Kolberg (Kołobrzeg) with "Kolberg: 1945 - the last fight" (Polish: Kołobrzeg 1945 Ostatni bój) in the Museum of Polish Weaponry (Muzeum Oręża Polskiego) in Kołobrzeg
- "battle of Mokra" (Polish: Bitwa pod Mokrą)

He also authored portraits of Polish military figures:

- Stanisław Sosabowski

His picture "On the outskirts of Warsaw" (Polish: Na przedpolach Warszawy) has been part of the Polish Post series in 1968, on the 25th anniversary of the People's Polish Army.
