= Kostiukhnivka =

Village in Volyn Oblast, Ukraine

- Village
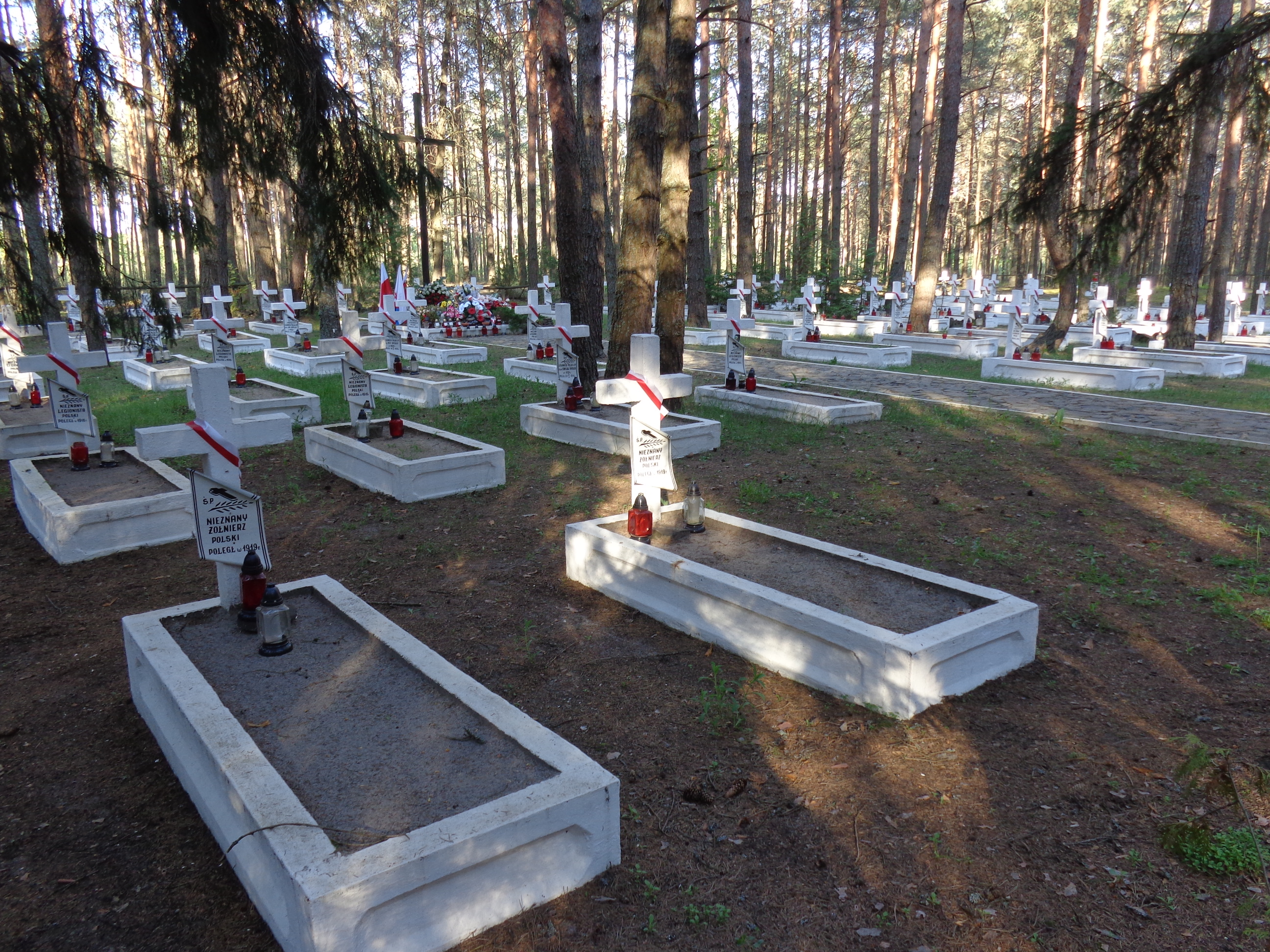
- Polish military cemetery from World War I

- Location within Ukraine
- Coordinates: 51°21′16″N 25°45′14″E
- Country: Ukraine
- Oblast: Volyn
- Raion: Kamin-Kashyrskyi

Area
  - Total: 1.1 km^{2} (0.42 sq mi)
- Elevation: 162 m (531 ft)
- Time zone: UTC+2 (EET)
  - Summer (DST): UTC+3 (EEST)

Kostyukhnivka (Ukrainian: Костюхнівка, Polish: Kostiuchnówka) is a village in Kamin-Kashyrskyi Raion of Volyn Oblast, Ukraine, but was formerly administered within Manevychi Raion. The village is known for the Battle of Kostiuchnówka, in which the Poles defeated the Russians, and as the place of establishment of the accomplished Legia Warsaw football club, relocated to Warsaw in 1920.

== History ==
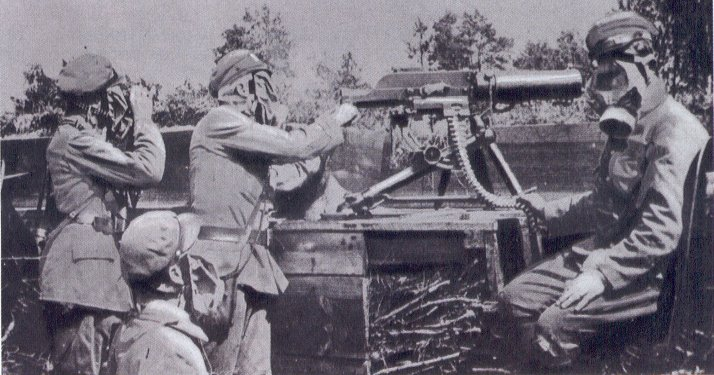
Polish Legions in the Battle of Kostiuchnówka, 1916

The village was either founded or first mentioned in 1577. It formed part of the Volhynian Voivodeship in the Lesser Poland Province of the Kingdom of Poland until the Third Partition of Poland in 1795, when it was annexed by Russia.

In March 1916, the football club of the Polish Legions, soon known as Legia Warsaw, was founded in Kostiuchnówka. In July 1916, it was the site of the Battle of Kostiuchnówka between the Russian Army and the Polish Legions in the opening phase of the Brusilov Offensive of World War I.

In the interbellum, it was part of newly reborn Poland, within which it was administratively located in the Wołyń Voivodeship. In 1928, a celebration of the 10th anniversary of Poland's independence was held in Kostiuchnówka with the participation of 3,000 people, and the laying of the Legions' Mound of Glory on the Polska Góra (Polish Hill) began. The largest battle anniversary celebrations in history were held on the battle's twentieth anniversary, with 15,000 people attending. A school with a tourist lodge, erected by the Polish Legions Foundation with contributions from veterans, was then opened.

Following the joint German-Soviet invasion of Poland, which started World War II in September 1939, the village was occupied by the Soviet Union until 1941, by Nazi Germany until 1944, and then re-occupied by the Soviet Union, which annexed it from Poland in 1945.

== Sights ==
There is a Polish Legions cemetery from World War I in the village.
