= Józefów, Lublin County =

Józefów
- Village
- Location within Poland
- Coordinates: 51°19′12″N 22°24′7″E
- Country: Poland
- Voivodeship: Lublin
- County: Lublin
- Gmina: Jastków

Population
  - Total: 240

Józefów (Polish pronunciation: [juˈzɛfuf]) is a village in the administrative district of Gmina Jastków, within Lublin County, Lublin Voivodeship, in eastern Poland.
