= 1st Brigade, Polish Legions =

Unit of the Austro-Hungarian Army (1914–1917)

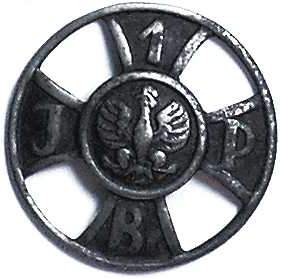
Memorial badge of the I Brigade

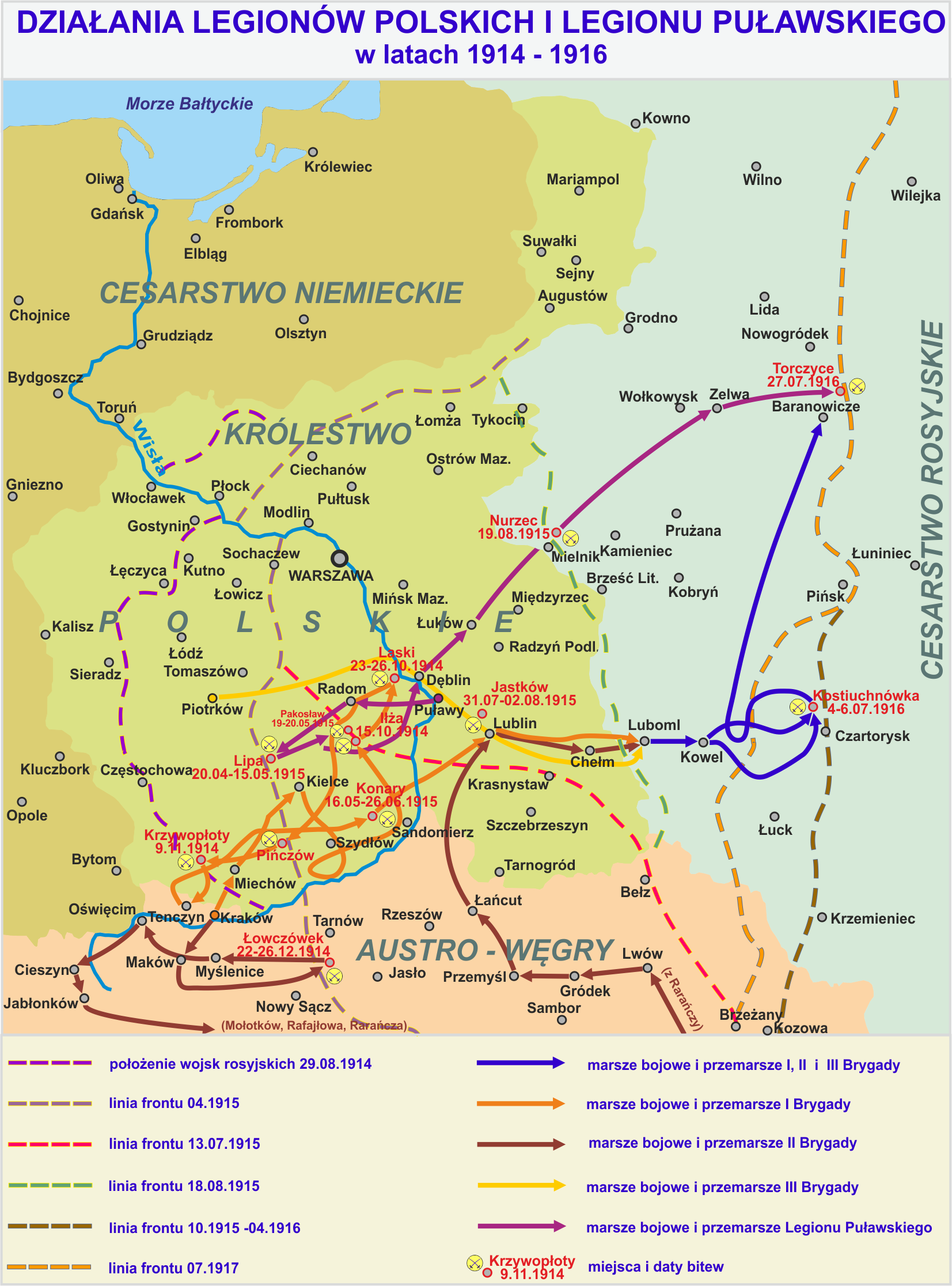
Operations of the Polish Legions

Brigade I of the Polish Legions (Polish: I Brygada Legionów Polskich, Austrian German: Brigade I der Polnischen Legion, Hungarian: A Lengyel Légió I. Dandárja) was a unit of Austro-Hungarian Army, manned by Poles under Austrian occupation, part of the Polish Legions in World War I, existing from 1914 to 1917.

== History ==
The First Brigade was formed on December 19, 1914, as part of the Polish Legions in World War I. Until October 1916 the First Brigade was commanded by Józef Piłsudski, thereafter by Marian Żegota-Januszajtis. The First Brigade and the Third Brigade were disbanded after the 1917 Oath Crisis.

The March of the First Brigade was one of the best-known songs of the Polish Legions.

=== Combat ===
Major battles fought by the First Brigade included:

- battle of Łowczówek (December 22–25, 1914)
- battle of Konary (May 16–25, 1915)
- battle of Jastków (July 30 – August 3, 1915)
- battle of Kamionka (August 4–7, 1915)
- battle of Kostiuchnówka (July 4–6, 1916)

== Organization ==
The First Brigade comprised 3 infantry regiments (the 1st, 5th and 7th), a cavalry regiment (the 1st), artillery battalions, and support units.

== Composition ==
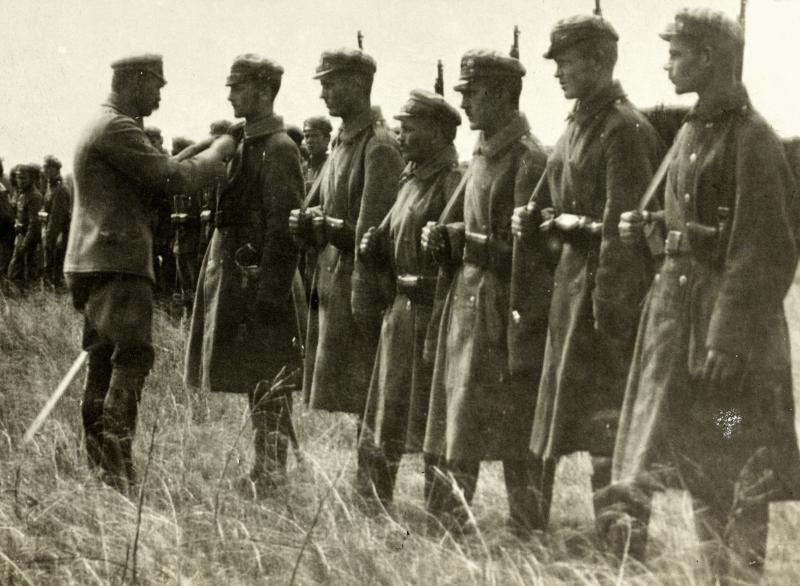
Józef Piłsudski awarding decorations to brigade members

The First Brigade consisted mostly of young soldiers of intelligentsia origin from Congress Poland. Unlike regular military units characterised by military drill, relations between First Brigade soldiers and officers were collegial. The unit was inspired by Napoleonic-era ideas and the Polish uprisings, especially the January Uprising of 1863. Another characteristic of the First Brigade was its total devotion to commander Józef Piłsudski, seen as the only military, moral and political authority by his soldiers.

Many writers, painters and other personalities of cultural life, served in the First Brigade. They include Wacław Sieroszewski, Andrzej Strug, Gustaw Daniłowski, Włodzimierz Tetmajer or Juliusz Kaden-Bandrowski.
