= Panieńszczyzna =

- Village
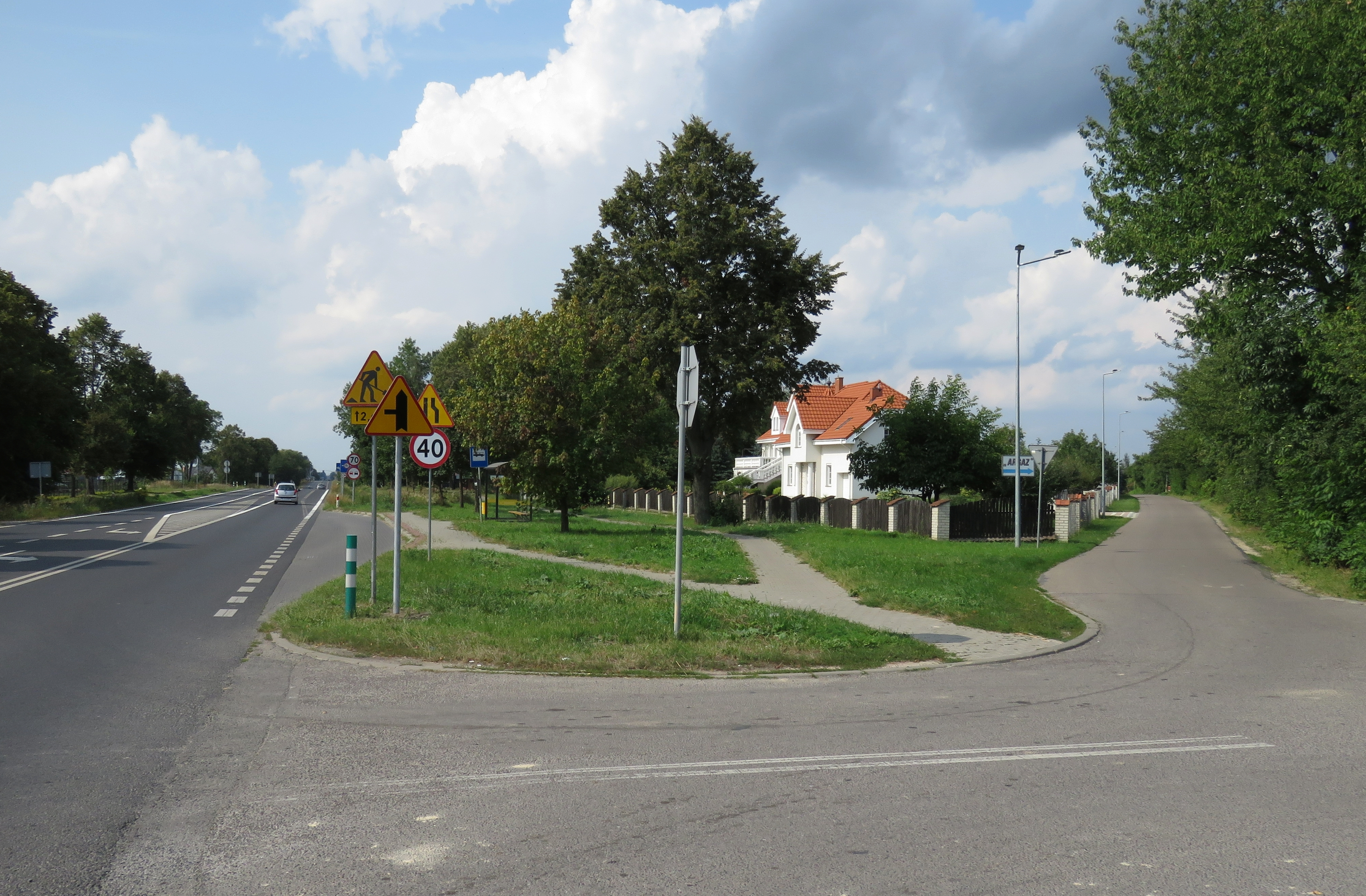

- Location within Poland
- Coordinates: 51°17′38″N 22°27′09″E
- Country: Poland
- Voivodeship: Lublin
- County: Lublin
- Gmina: Jastków

Panieńszczyzna [paɲɛɲʂˈt͡ʂɨzna] is a village in the administrative district of Gmina Jastków, within Lublin County, Lublin Voivodeship, in eastern Poland.
