= 3rd Brigade, Polish Legions =

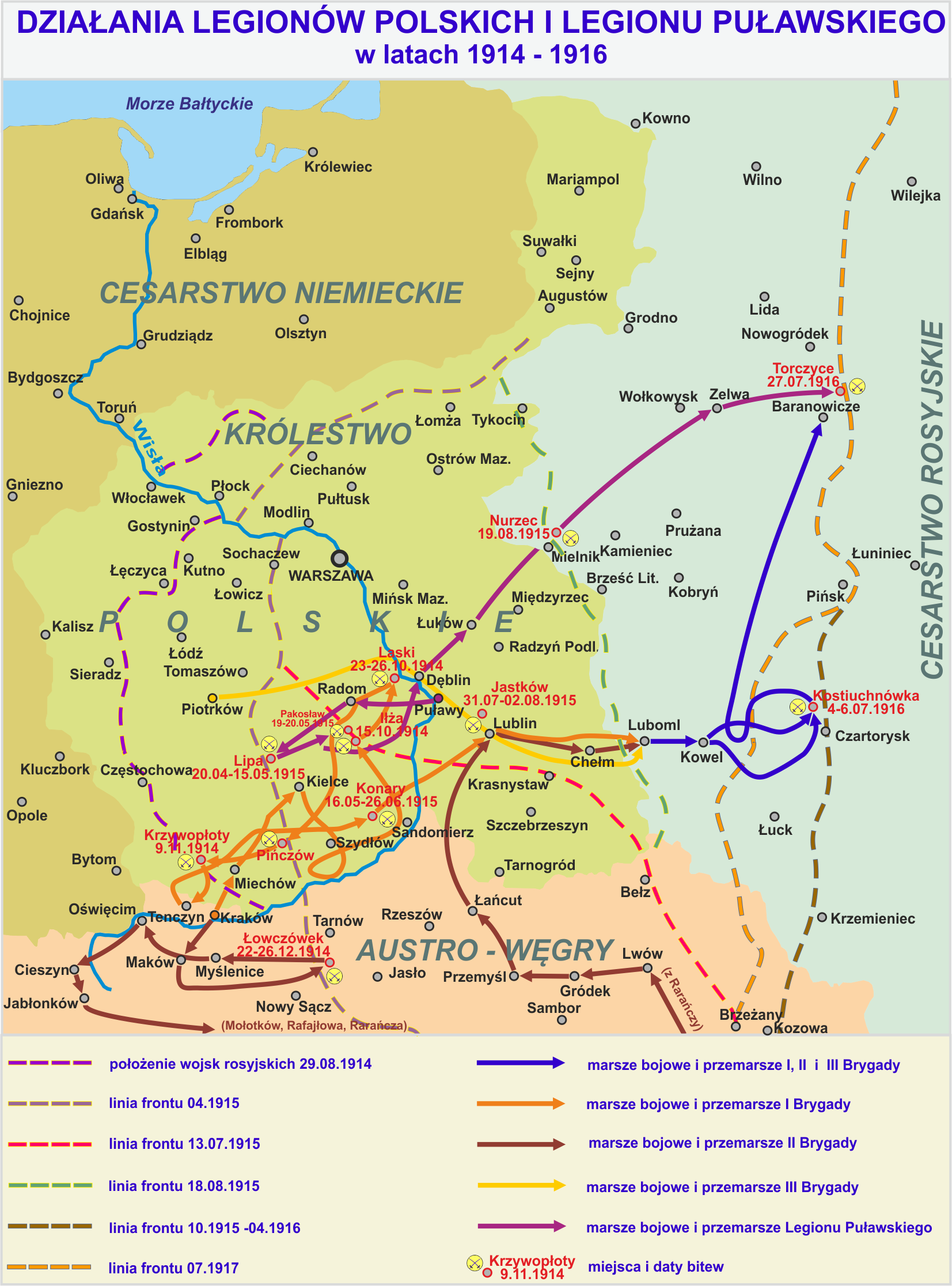
Operations of the Polish Legions

Brigade III of the Polish Legions (Polish: III Brygada Legionów Polskich, Austrian German: Brigade III der Polnischen Legion, Hungarian: A Lengyel Légió III. Dandárja) was a unit of the Austro-Hungarian Army, manned by Austrian-Poles. It fought in the first battle of the Eastern Front in WWI: Battle of Jastków. It was formed in 1915, and existed until 1917, and was a part of the Polish Legions in World War I.

== History ==
The Third Brigade was formed on 8 May 1915, as part of the Polish Legions in World War I.

The Brigade commanders included: Zygmunt Zieliński (April 1915 - September 1915), Wiktor Grzesicki (September 1915 - July 1916), Stanisław Szeptycki (July 1916 - October 1916), and Bolesław Roja (?).

In 1917 the III Brigade together with the I Brigade followed Józef Piłsudski during the Oath crisis, refusing to swear the oath, and was disbanded.

=== Battles ===
Battles fought by the Third Brigade include:

- Battle of Jastków (31 July to 3 August 1915)
- Battle of Kostiuchnówka (4 to 6 July 1916)

== Organization ==
The Third Brigade comprised two infantry regiments (the 4th, 5th and the 6th periodically served in it), a cavalry regiment (the 3rd), artillery battalions, and support units.
