= Battle of Jastków =

Battle in 1915 during the First World War

- Part of Russian Great Retreat during First World War
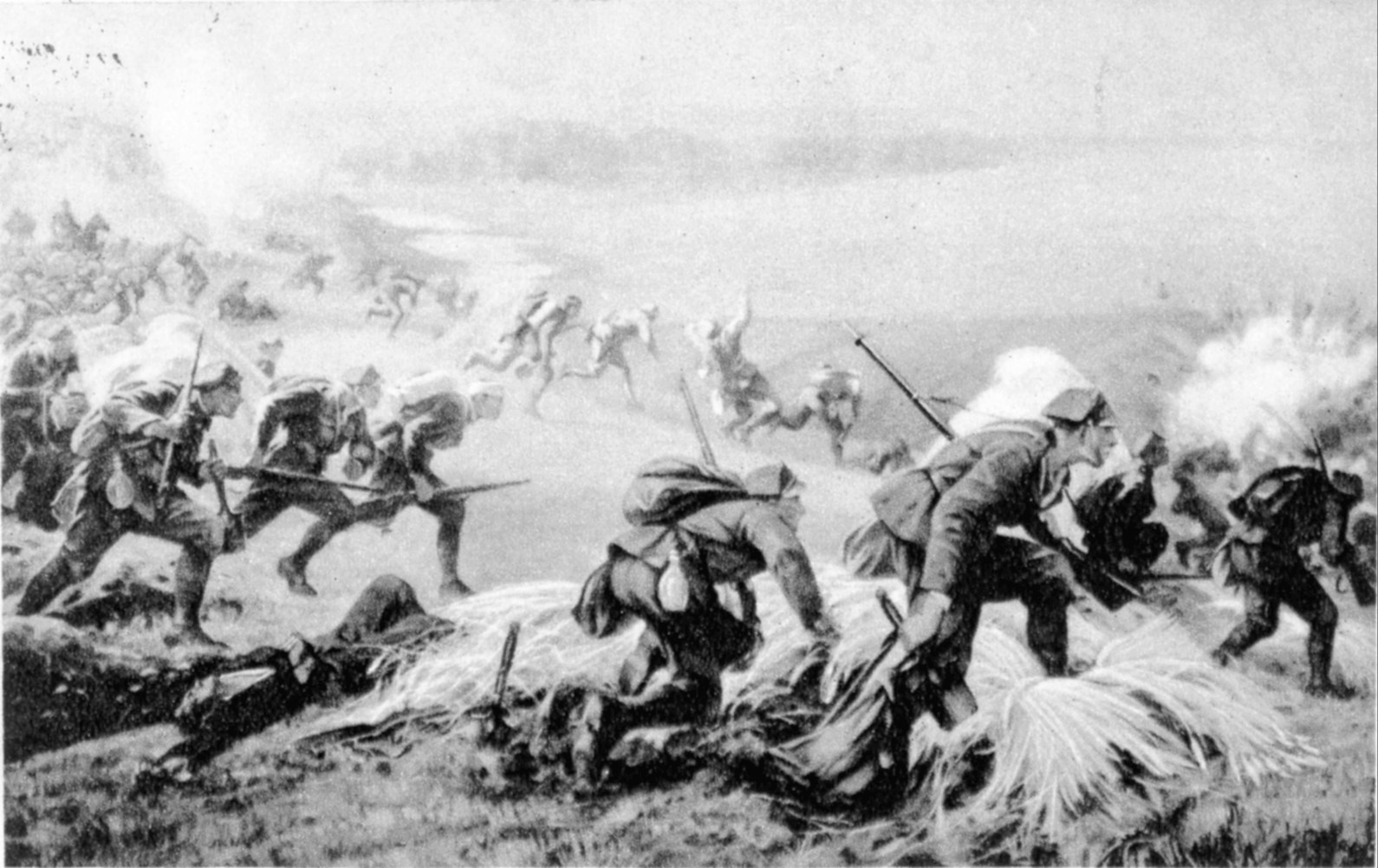
- Polish infantry charge
| Date | July 31 – August 3, 1915 |
| Location | Jastków, Lublin Governorate, Congress Poland, Russian Empire |
| Result | Austro-Hungarian victory |

Belligerents
| Austria-Hungary | Russian Empire |

Commanders and leaders
| Józef Piłsudski; Bolesław Roja | Unknown |

The Battle of Jastków was a World War I battle that took place July 31–August 3, 1915, near the village of Jastków, in the Lublin Governorate of Congress Poland, Russian Empire. It was a major clash between the Russian Army and the Austro-Hungarian Polish Legions (primarily the 1st Brigade, Polish Legions). It was one of the Legion's largest engagements, and its first major one. The battle ended with the Austro-Hungarian and Polish victory, as the Russian forces retreated.
