= Płouszowice =

- Village
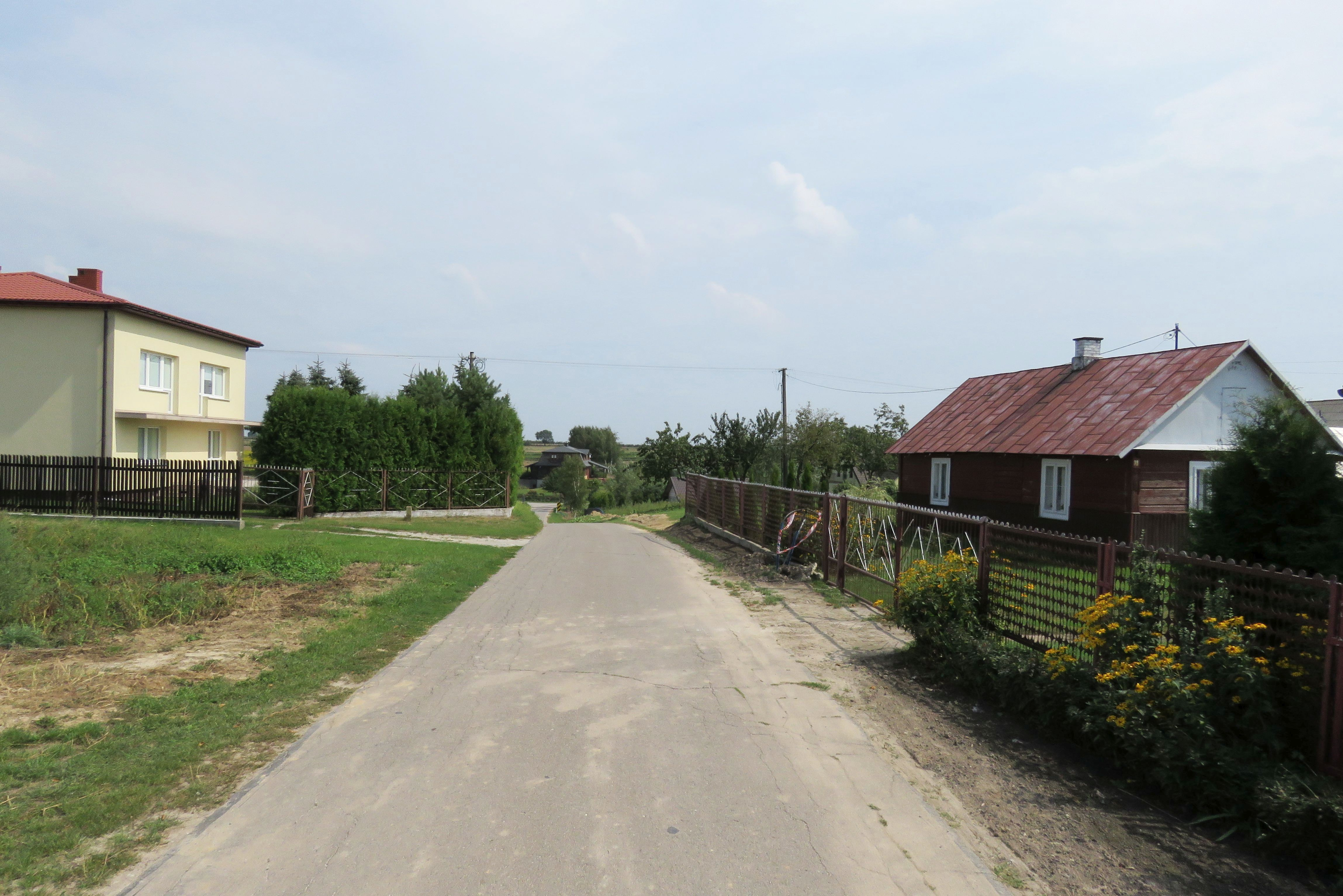
- View of Płouszowice

- Location within Poland
- Coordinates: 51°16′15″N 22°24′42″E
- Country: Poland
- Voivodeship: Lublin
- County: Lublin
- Gmina: Jastków
- Time zone: UTC+1 (CET)
  - Summer (DST): UTC+2 (CEST)

Płouszowice [pwɔuʂɔˈvit͡sɛ] is a village in the administrative district of Gmina Jastków, within Lublin County, Lublin Voivodeship, in eastern Poland.

== History ==
Three Polish citizens were murdered by Nazi Germany in the village during World War II.
