= Barak, Lublin Voivodeship =

Barak
- Village
- Location within Poland
- Coordinates: 51°17′7″N 22°27′37″E
- Country: Poland
- Voivodeship: Lublin
- County: Lublin
- Gmina: Jastków

Barak [ˈbarak] is a village in the administrative district of Gmina Jastków, within Lublin County, Lublin Voivodeship, in eastern Poland.
