= Tomaszowice-Kolonia =

- Village
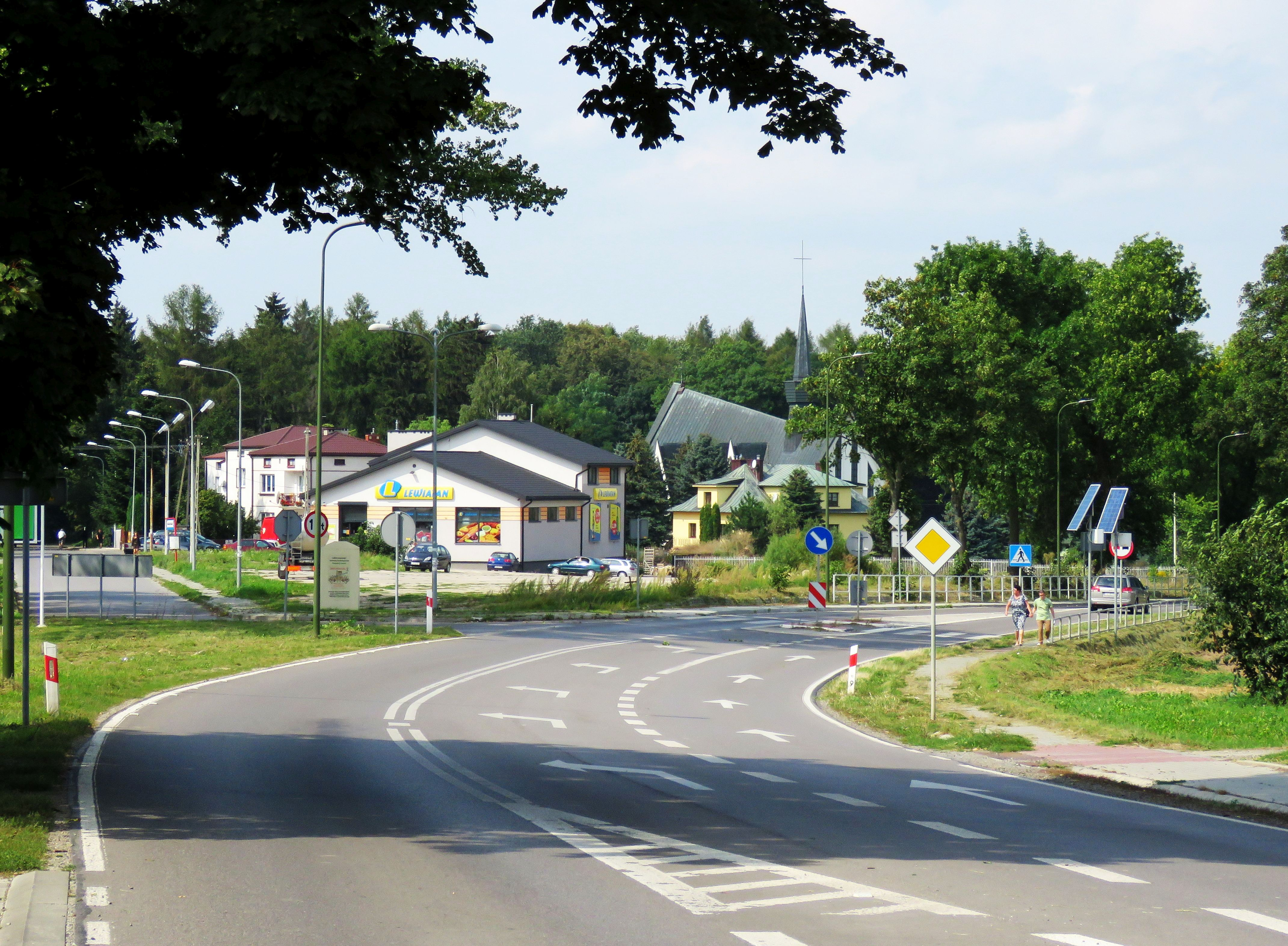

- Location within Poland
- Coordinates: 51°16′44″N 22°21′29″E
- Country: Poland
- Voivodeship: Lublin
- County: Lublin
- Gmina: Jastków

Tomaszowice-Kolonia [tɔmaʂɔˈvit͡sɛ kɔˈlɔɲa] is a village in the administrative district of Gmina Jastków, within Lublin County, Lublin Voivodeship, in eastern Poland.
