= Piotrawin, Lublin County =

Piotrawin
- Village
- Location within Poland
- Coordinates: 51°19′33″N 22°25′42″E
- Country: Poland
- Voivodeship: Lublin
- County: Lublin
- Gmina: Jastków

Piotrawin [pjɔˈtravin] is a village in the administrative district of Gmina Jastków, which is located in Lublin County of Lublin Voivodeship in eastern Poland.
