= Gmina Jastków =

Gmina Jastków Jastków Commune
- Gmina
- Flag Coat of arms
- Interactive map of Gmina Jastków
- Coordinates (Jastków): 51°19′N 22°28′E
- Country: Poland
- Voivodeship: Lublin
- County: Lublin County
- Seat: Jastków

Area
  - Total: 113.76 km^{2} (43.92 sq mi)

Population (2019)
  - Total: 14,062
  - Density: 123.61/km^{2} (320.15/sq mi)
- Website: https://www.jastkow.pl

Gmina Jastków is a rural gmina (administrative district) in Lublin County, Lublin Voivodeship, in eastern Poland. Its seat is the village of Jastków, which lies approximately 11 kilometres (7 mi) north-west of the regional capital Lublin.

The gmina covers an area of 113.76 square kilometres (43.9 sq mi), and as of 2019 its total population is 14,062 (13,479 in 2013).

== Villages ==
Gmina Jastków contains the villages and settlements of Barak, Dąbrowica, Dębówka, Jastków, Józefów, Ługów, Marysin, Moszenki, Moszna, Moszna-Kolonia, Natalin, Ożarów, Panieńszczyzna, Piotrawin, Płouszowice, Płouszowice-Kolonia, Sieprawice, Sieprawki, Sługocin, Smugi, Snopków, Tomaszowice, Tomaszowice-Kolonia and Wysokie.

== Neighbouring gminas ==
Gmina Jastków is bordered by the city of Lublin and by the gminas of Garbów, Konopnica, Nałęczów, Niemce and Wojciechów.
