= Marysin, Gmina Jastków =

Marysin
- Village
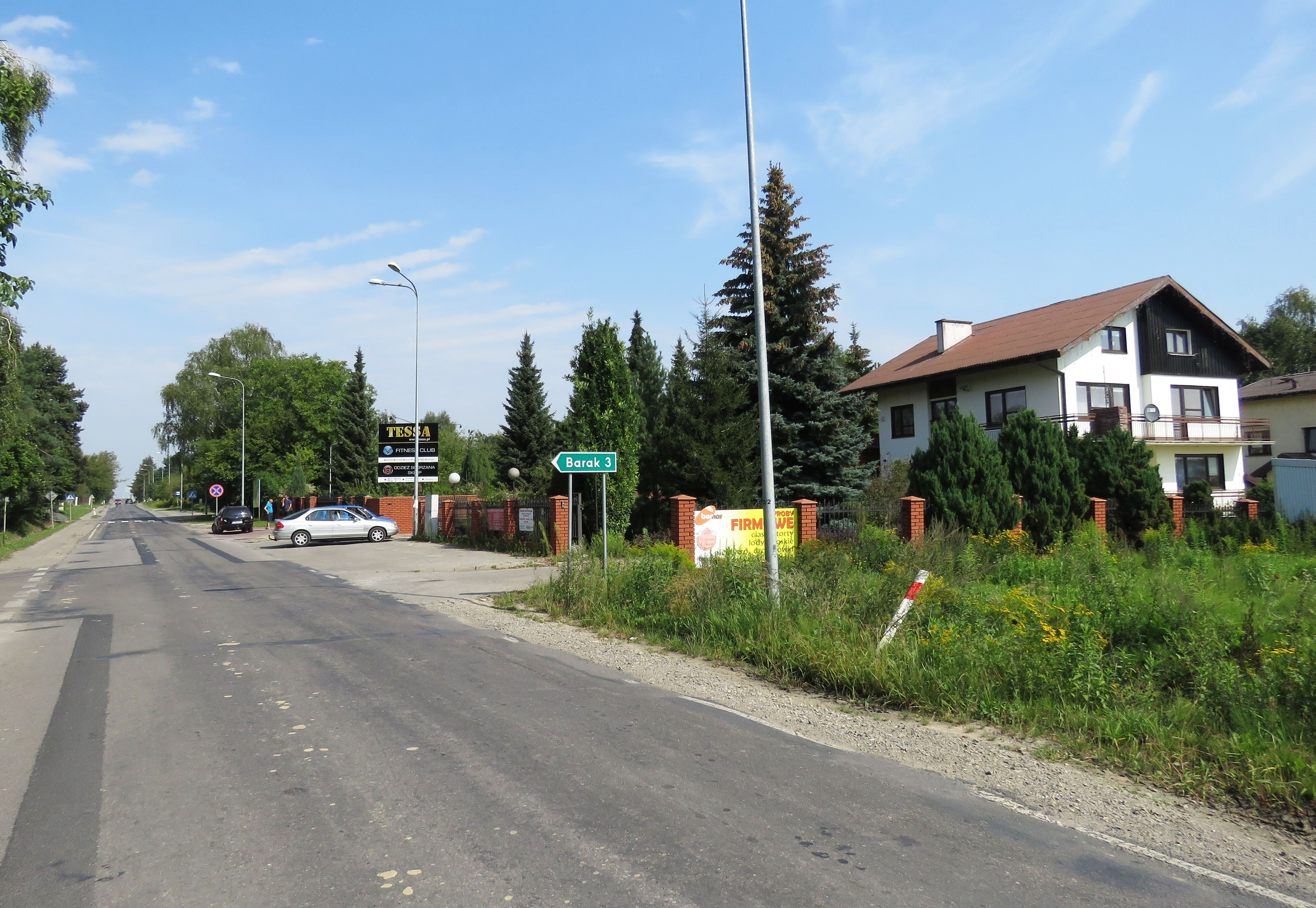
- Street of Marysin, Gmina Jastków

- Location within Poland
- Coordinates: 51°17′31″N 22°30′21″E
- Country: Poland
- Voivodeship: Lublin
- County: Lublin
- Gmina: Jastków

Marysin [maˈrɨɕin] is a village in the administrative district of Gmina Jastków, within Lublin County, Lublin Voivodeship, in eastern Poland.
