= Sługocin, Lublin Voivodeship =

Sługocin
- Village
- Location within Poland
- Coordinates: 51°19′N 22°22′E
- Country: Poland
- Voivodeship: Lublin
- County: Lublin
- Gmina: Jastków

Sługocin [swuˈɡɔt͡ɕin] is a village in the administrative district of Gmina Jastków, within Lublin County, Lublin Voivodeship, in eastern Poland.
