= Sieprawki =

- Village
- Location within Poland
- Coordinates: 51°18′N 22°23′E
- Country: Poland
- Voivodeship: Lublin
- County: Lublin
- Gmina: Jastków

Sieprawki [ɕɛˈprafki] is a village in the administrative district of Gmina Jastków, within Lublin County, Lublin Voivodeship, in eastern Poland.
