= Dębówka, Lublin Voivodeship =

Dębówka
- Village
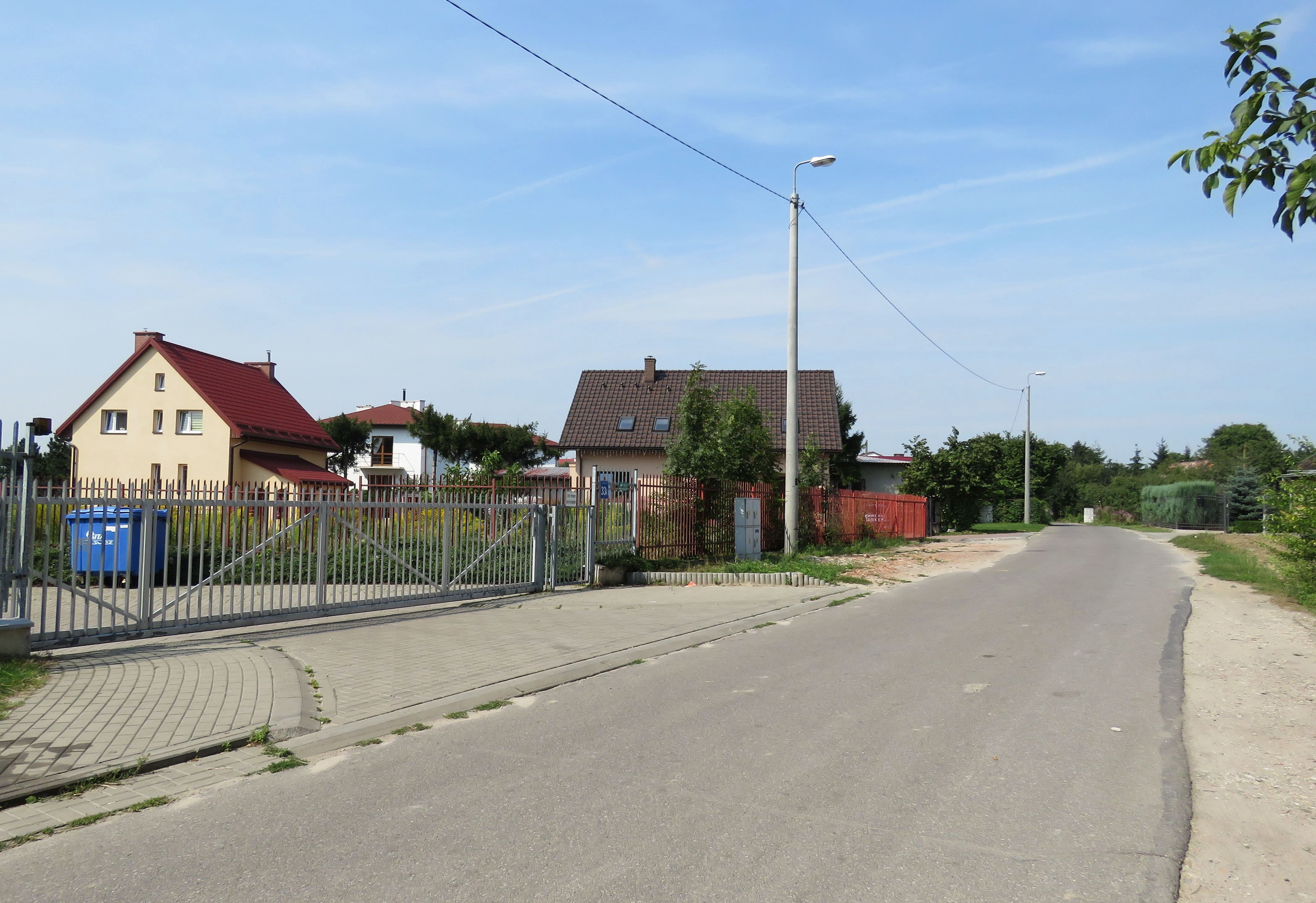

- Location within Poland
- Coordinates: 51°16′39″N 22°28′55″E
- Country: Poland
- Voivodeship: Lublin
- County: Lublin
- Gmina: Jastków

Dębówka [dɛmˈbufka] is a village in the administrative district of Gmina Jastków, within Lublin County, Lublin Voivodeship, in eastern Poland.

A new lantern of the dead constructed in the Romanesque style was completed in 2021 in Dębowka. A custom of Roman Catholicism which has fallen out of fashion, the new lantern is the first such construction to be built in Europe in centuries.
