= Natalin, Lublin County =

Natalin
- Village
- Location within Poland
- Coordinates: 51°18′N 22°29′E
- Country: Poland
- Voivodeship: Lublin
- County: Lublin
- Gmina: Jastków

Natalin [naˈtalin] is a village in the administrative district of Gmina Jastków, within Lublin County, Lublin Voivodeship, in eastern Poland.
