= Płouszowice-Kolonia =

- Village
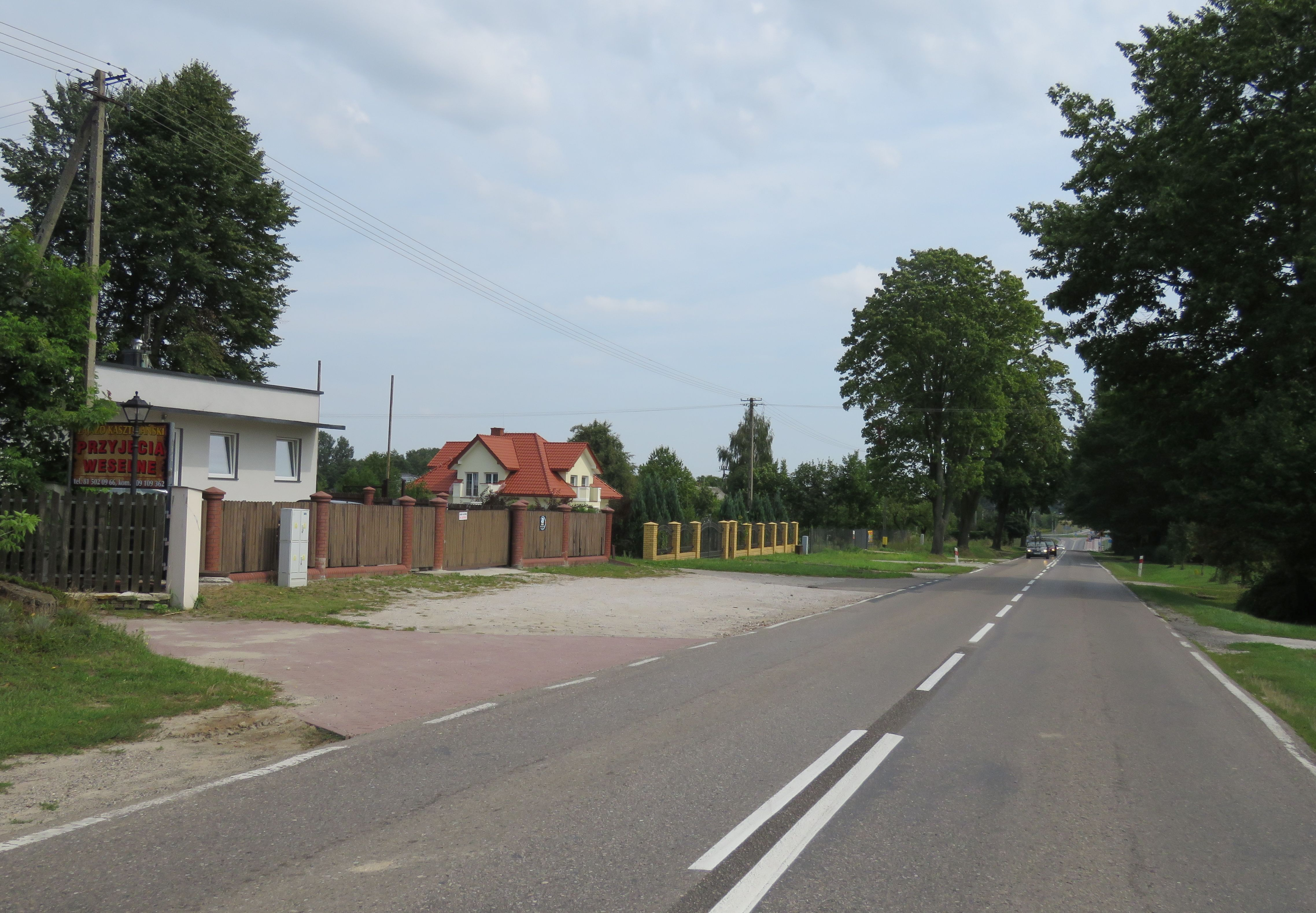
- View of Płouszowice-Kolonia

- Location within Poland
- Coordinates: 51°15′40″N 22°26′20″E
- Country: Poland
- Voivodeship: Lublin
- County: Lublin
- Gmina: Jastków

Płouszowice-Kolonia [pwɔuʂɔˈvit͡sɛ kɔˈlɔɲa] is a village in the administrative district of Gmina Jastków, within Lublin County, Lublin Voivodeship, in eastern Poland.
