= Tomaszowice =

- Village
- Location within Poland
- Coordinates: 51°16′59″N 22°22′31″E
- Country: Poland
- Voivodeship: Lublin
- County: Lublin
- Gmina: Jastków

Tomaszowice [tɔmaʂɔˈvit͡sɛ] is a village in the administrative district of Gmina Jastków, within Lublin County, Lublin Voivodeship, in eastern Poland. It was formerly known as Thomaszenicze.
