= Moszna, Lublin Voivodeship =

Moszna
- Village
- Location within Poland
- Coordinates: 51°17′N 22°18′E
- Country: Poland
- Voivodeship: Lublin
- County: Lublin
- Gmina: Jastków
- Area code: +48 81
- Car plates: LUB

Moszna [ˈmɔʂna] is a village in the administrative district of Gmina Jastków, within Lublin County, Lublin Voivodeship, in eastern Poland.
