= Jastków, Lublin Voivodeship =

Jastków
- Village
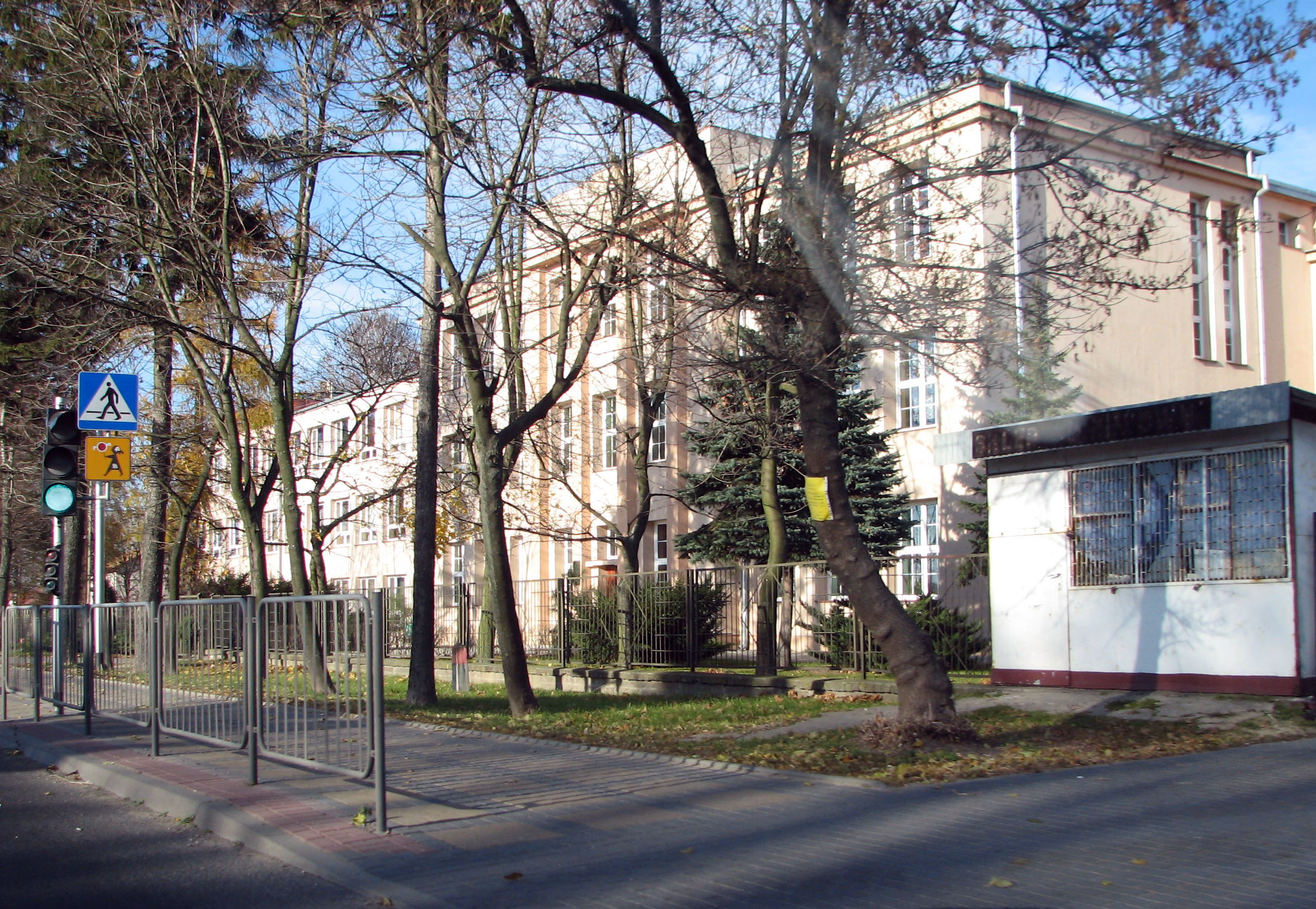
- Primary school in Jastków.

- Location within Poland
- Coordinates: 51°19′N 22°28′E
- Country: Poland
- Voivodeship: Lublin
- County: Lublin
- Gmina: Jastków

Population
  - Total: 700

Jastków [ˈjastkuf] is a village in Lublin County, Lublin Voivodeship, in eastern Poland. It is the seat of the gmina (administrative district) called Gmina Jastków.

== Monuments ==
- Polish Legionnaires' Cemetery
- Zespół pałacowo-parkowy w Jastkowie
