= Cellefrouin =

- Commune
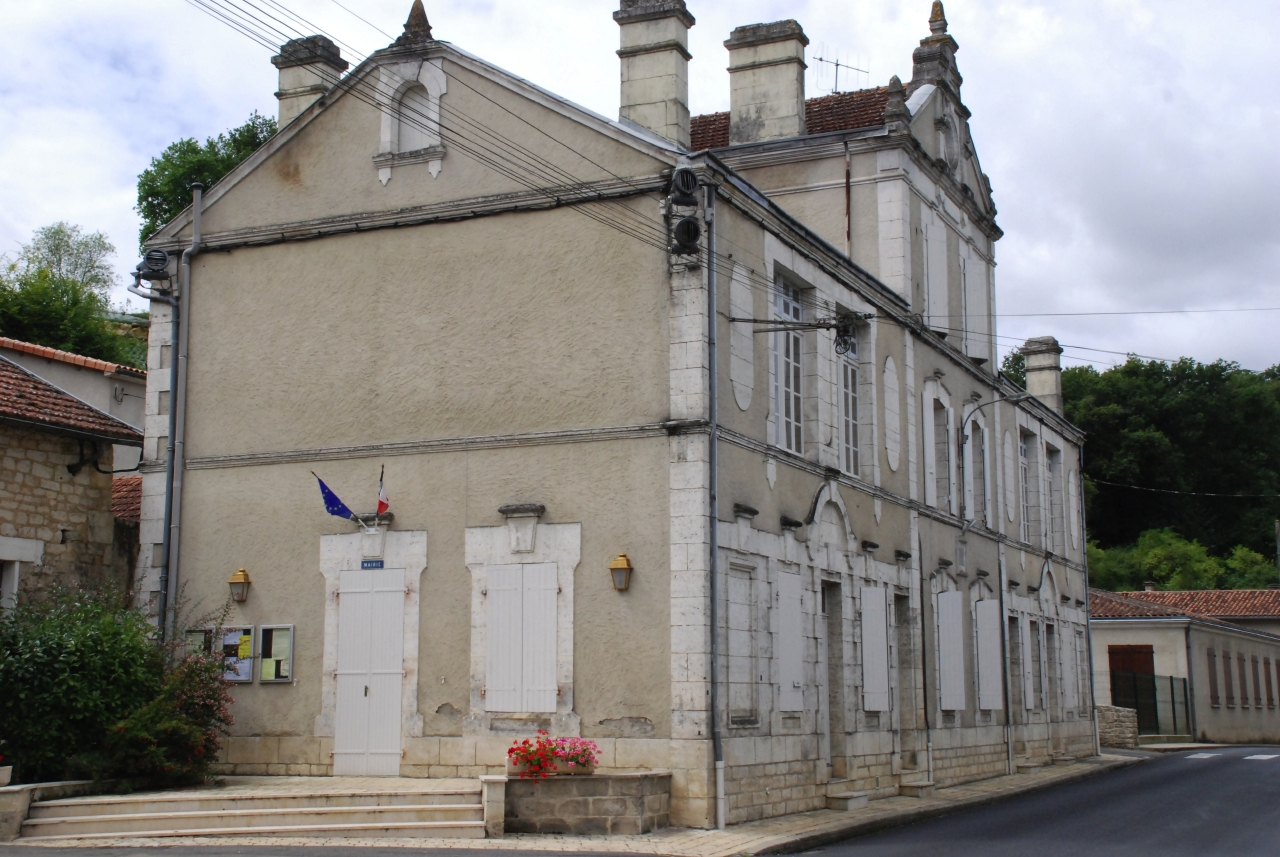
- Town hall
- Location of Cellefrouin
- Location within France Location within Nouvelle-Aquitaine
- Coordinates: 45°53′28″N 0°23′29″E
- Country: France
- Region: Nouvelle-Aquitaine
- Department: Charente
- Arrondissement: Confolens
- Canton: Boixe-et-Manslois
- Intercommunality: Cœur de Charente

Government
  - Mayor (2020–2026): Marie-Annick Perche
- Area^{1}: 40.09 km^{2} (15.48 sq mi)
- Elevation: 142 m (466 ft)
- Highest elevation: 189 m (620 ft)
- Lowest elevation: 81 m (266 ft)
- Population (2023): 598
  - Density: 14.9/km^{2} (38.6/sq mi)
- Time zone: UTC+01:00 (CET)
  - Summer (DST): UTC+02:00 (CEST)
- INSEE/Postal code: 16068 /16260
- ^{1} French Land Register data, which excludes lakes, ponds, glaciers > 1 km^{2} (0.386 sq mi or 247 acres) and river estuaries.

Cellefrouin (French pronunciation: [sɛlfʁuɛ̃]) is a commune in the Charente department in southwestern France. It is the site of the remains of the canonry of Cellefrouin, founded in 1025 by Arnald of Vitabre, bishop of Périgueux.

== Population ==
Historical population
Year	Pop.	±% p.a.
1968	730	—
1975	593	−2.93%
1982	580	−0.32%
1990	563	−0.37%
1999	508	−1.14%
2007	513	+0.12%
2012	563	+1.88%
2017	572	+0.32%
2023	598	+0.74%
Source: INSEE

== See also ==
- Communes of the Charente department
