= Snopków =

- Village
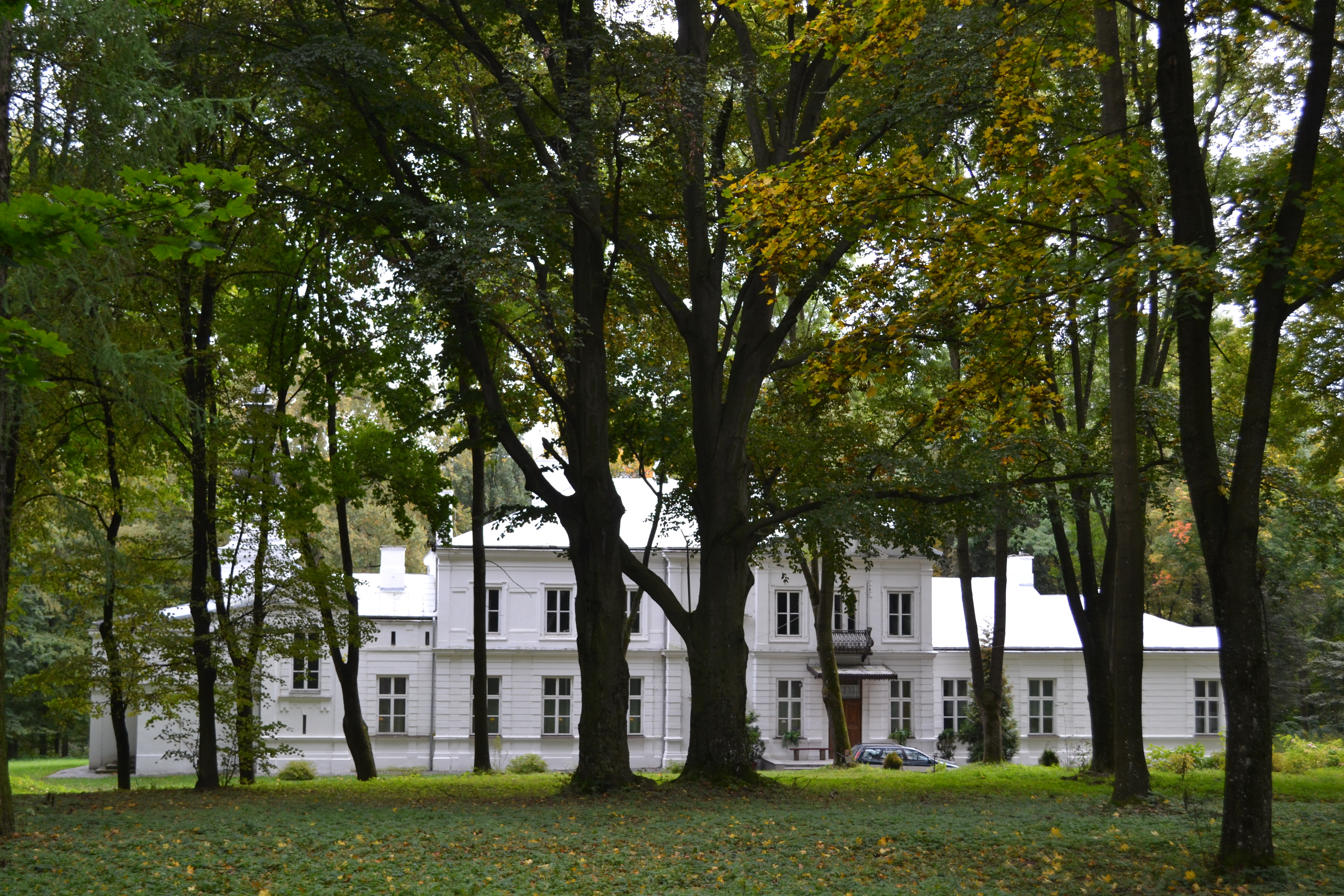
- Snopków Palace and park

- Location within Poland
- Coordinates: 51°19′N 22°29′E
- Country: Poland
- Voivodeship: Lublin
- County: Lublin
- Gmina: Jastków
- Time zone: UTC+1 (CET)
  - Summer (DST): UTC+2 (CEST)
- Vehicle registration: LUB

Snopków [ˈsnɔpkuf] is a village in the administrative district of Gmina Jastków, within Lublin County, Lublin Voivodeship, in eastern Poland. The population of Snopków was 928 in 2011.
