= Wysokie, Gmina Jastków =

Wysokie
- Village
- Location within Poland
- Coordinates: 51°18′52″N 22°21′17″E
- Country: Poland
- Voivodeship: Lublin
- County: Lublin
- Gmina: Jastków

Wysokie [vɨˈsɔkʲɛ] is a village in the administrative district of Gmina Jastków, within Lublin County, Lublin Voivodeship, in eastern Poland.
