= 46th Army Corps (Russian Empire) =

- Country: Russian Empire
- Allegiance: Imperial Russian Army
- Engagements: World War I

The 46th Army Corps was an Army corps in the Imperial Russian Army.

== Part of ==
- 7th Army: 1916
- 8th Army: 1916
- 3rd Army: 1916 - 1917
- Russian Special Army: 1917
