= Ożarów, Lublin Voivodeship =

Ożarów
- Village
- Location within Poland
- Coordinates: 51°17′44″N 22°18′12″E
- Country: Poland
- Voivodeship: Lublin
- County: Lublin
- Gmina: Jastków

Population
  - Total: 700
- Time zone: UTC+1 (CET)
  - Summer (DST): UTC+2 (CEST)

Ożarów [ɔˈʐaruf] is a village in the administrative district of Gmina Jastków, within Lublin County, Lublin Voivodeship, in eastern Poland.

== History ==
Six Polish citizens were murdered by Nazi Germany in the village during World War II.
