= Monument to the Mayors of Great Warsaw =

Monument in Warsaw, Poland

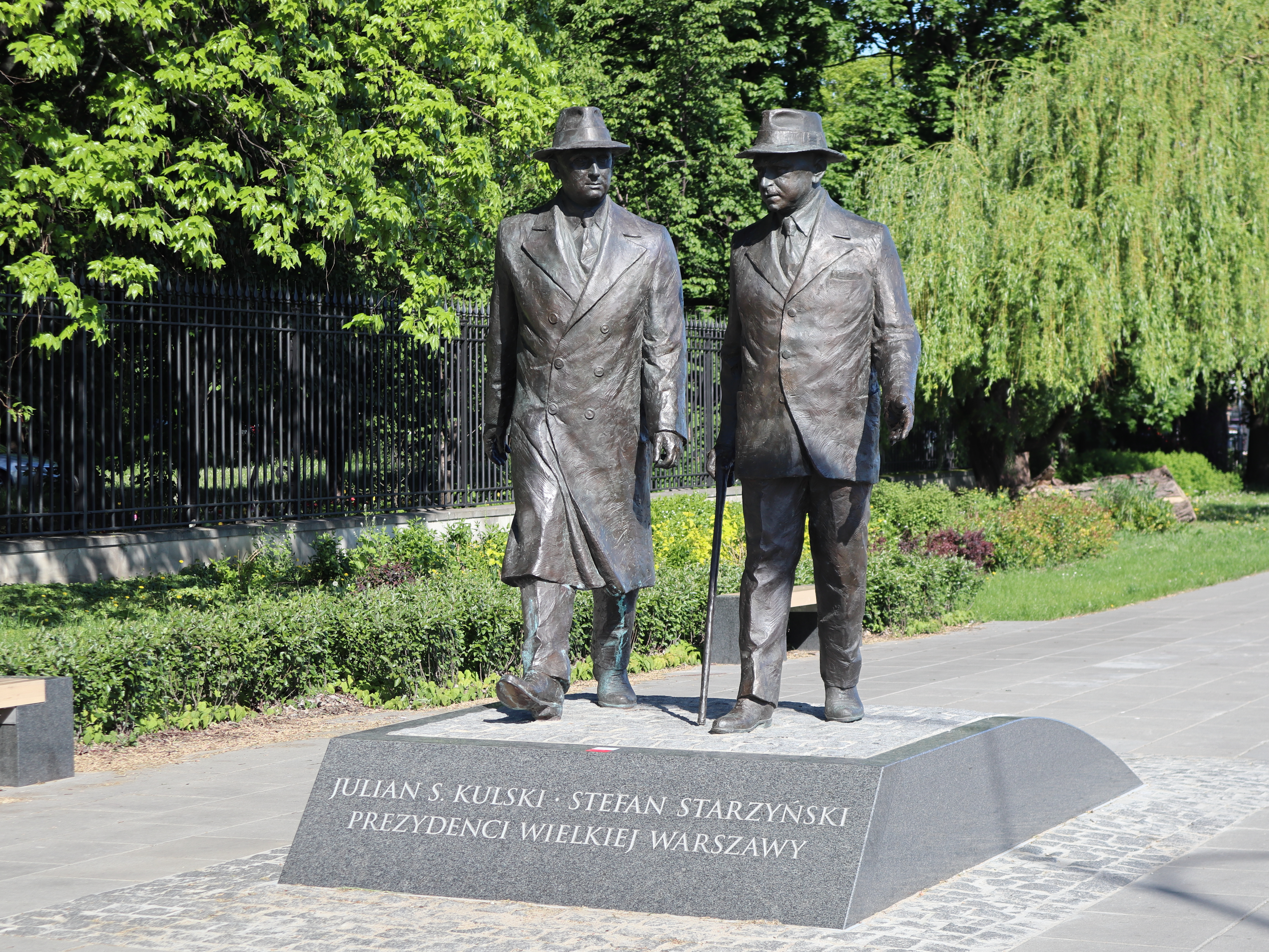
- The monument in 2022.
- Interactive map of Monument to the Mayors of Great Warsaw
- Location: Wybrzeże Gdańskie Street, Downtown, Warsaw, Poland
- Coordinates: 52.249583°N 21.016832°E
- Designer: Paweł Pietrusiński
- Type: Statue
- Opening date: 9 October 2021
- Dedicated to: Stefan Starzyński and Julian Kulski

The Monument to the Mayors of Great Warsaw (Polish: Pomnik Prezydentów Wielkiej Warszawy) is a monument in Warsaw, Poland, located in the Old Town neighbourhood of the Downtown district. It is placed at Wybrzeże Gdańskie Street near the intersection with Grodzka Street, and next to the gardens of the Royal Castle. It consists of statues of Stefan Starzyński and Julian Kulski, mayors of Warsaw who served, respectively, from 1934 to 1939, and from 1939 to 1944. The monument was designed by Paweł Pietrusiński, and unveiled on 9 October 2021.

== History ==
The monument commemorates Stefan Starzyński and Julian Kulski. The prior was mayor of Warsaw from 1934 to 1939, and among other things, commanded the civil defence effort during the Siege of Warsaw. The latter was recognised by the Polish government-in-exile as the city mayor from 1939 to 1944, and served the office in the structures of the Polish Underground State. The statues were proposed by Julian Eugeniusz Kulski, military officer, architect, veteran of Warsaw Uprising, and son of Julian Kulski. He in turn was inspired by historian Kazimierz Sztarbałło. The monument was designed by Paweł Pietrusiński, and financed by the Kulski Foundation. It was unveiled on 9 October 2021.

== Characteristics ==
The monument is located in the Old Town neighbourhood of the Downtown district. It is placed at Wybrzeże Gdańskie Street near the intersection with Grodzka Street, next to the gardens of the Royal Castle. It consists of two statues of Julian Kulski to the left, and Stefan Starzyński to the right, depicted walking together alongside the pathway, and talking to each other. They are wearing suits, overcoats, and fedoras. Starzyński is aiding himself with a walking stick. The figures were based on 1937 photography depicting the mayors walking alongside the Vistulan Boulevards. The statues are placed on a short pedestal. It features the inscription as transcribed below.

Polish inscription

Julian S. Kulski ∙ Stefan Starzyński
Prezydenci Wielkiej Warszawy

English translation

Julian S. Kulski ∙ Stefan Starzyński
Mayors of Great Warsaw

== See also ==
- Stefan Starzyński Monument (Downtown, Warsaw)
- Stefan Starzyński Monument (Praga-Południe)
