= Fortress Warsaw =

Fortress Warsaw may refer to:

- Warsaw Citadel - the main part of Russian fortifications in Warsaw built in the 19th century
- Warsaw Fortress - the 19th century Russian fortress built in Warsaw and area
- Festung Warschau - the German name for defended city of Warsaw during World War II
