= Stefan Starzyński Monument (Downtown, Warsaw) =

Stefan Starzyński monument
- Pomnik Stefana Starzyńskiego
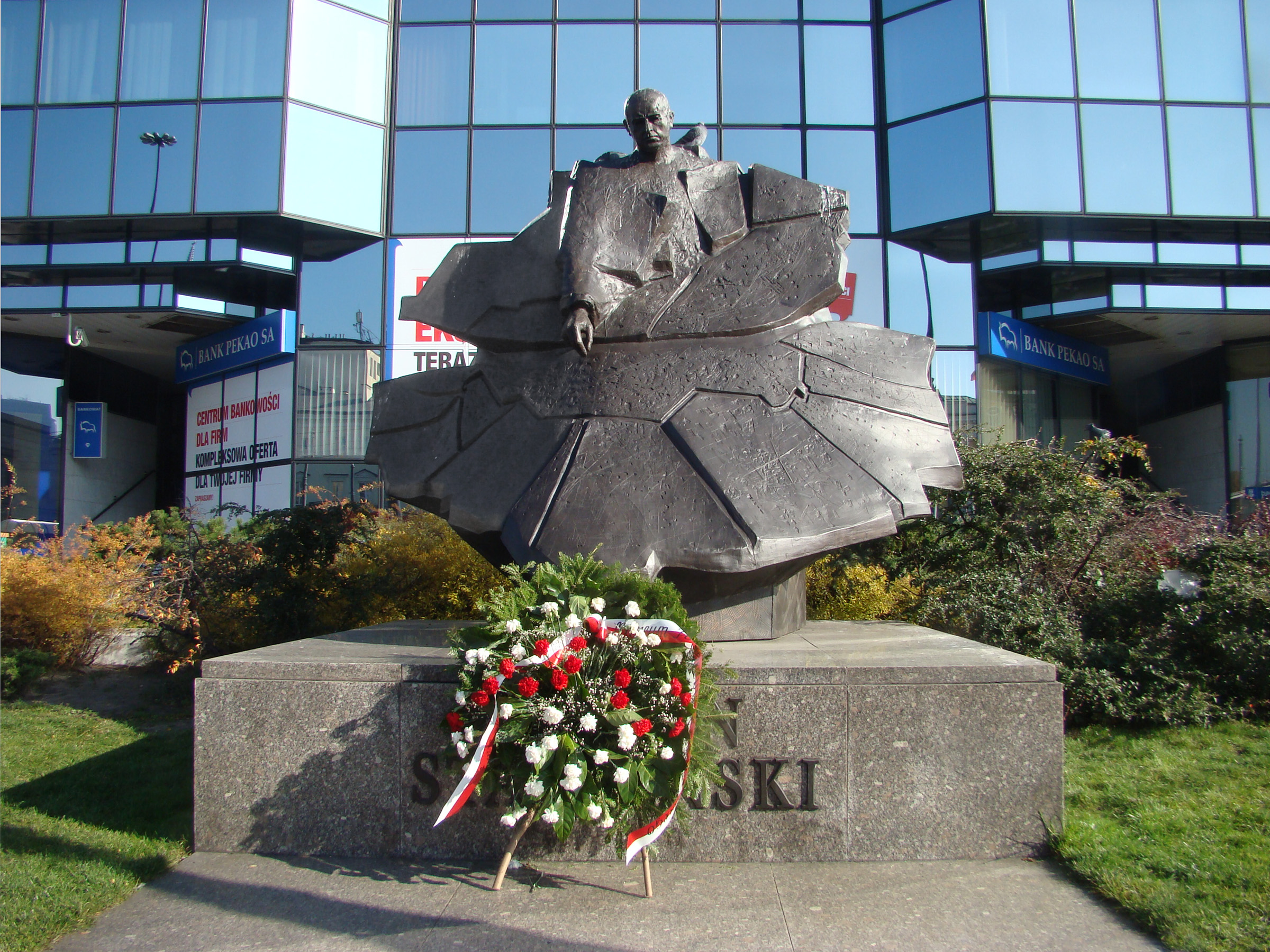
- The monument in Bank Square
- Interactive map of Stefan Starzyński monument
- Location: Warsaw
- Coordinates: 52°14′38″N 21°00′07″E
- Designer: Andrzej Renes
- Completion date: 10 November 1993

The Stefan Starzyński monument (Pomnik Stefana Starzyńskiego) in Bank Square in Warsaw is one of two Warsaw monuments dedicated to the memory of the former President of Warsaw, Stefan Starzyński. It is the work of sculptor Andrzej Renes.

It is on the eastern side of the square, on the sidewalk in front of the Błękitny Wieżowiec (Blue Skyscraper). The unveiling of the monument took place on 10 November 1993, to celebrate the hundredth year of the birth of the President.

The statue is cast in bronze and set on a granite pedestal. The intention of the author was to present the form of Starzyński leaning over a map of the city of Warsaw.

== See also ==
- Stefan Starzyński Monument (Praga-Południe), another monument in Warsaw dedicated to Stefan Starzyński
- Monument to the Mayors of Great Warsaw, another monumentin in Warsaw dedicated to Stefan Starzyński
