= Stefan Starzyński Monument (Praga-Południe) =

Monument in Warsaw, Poland

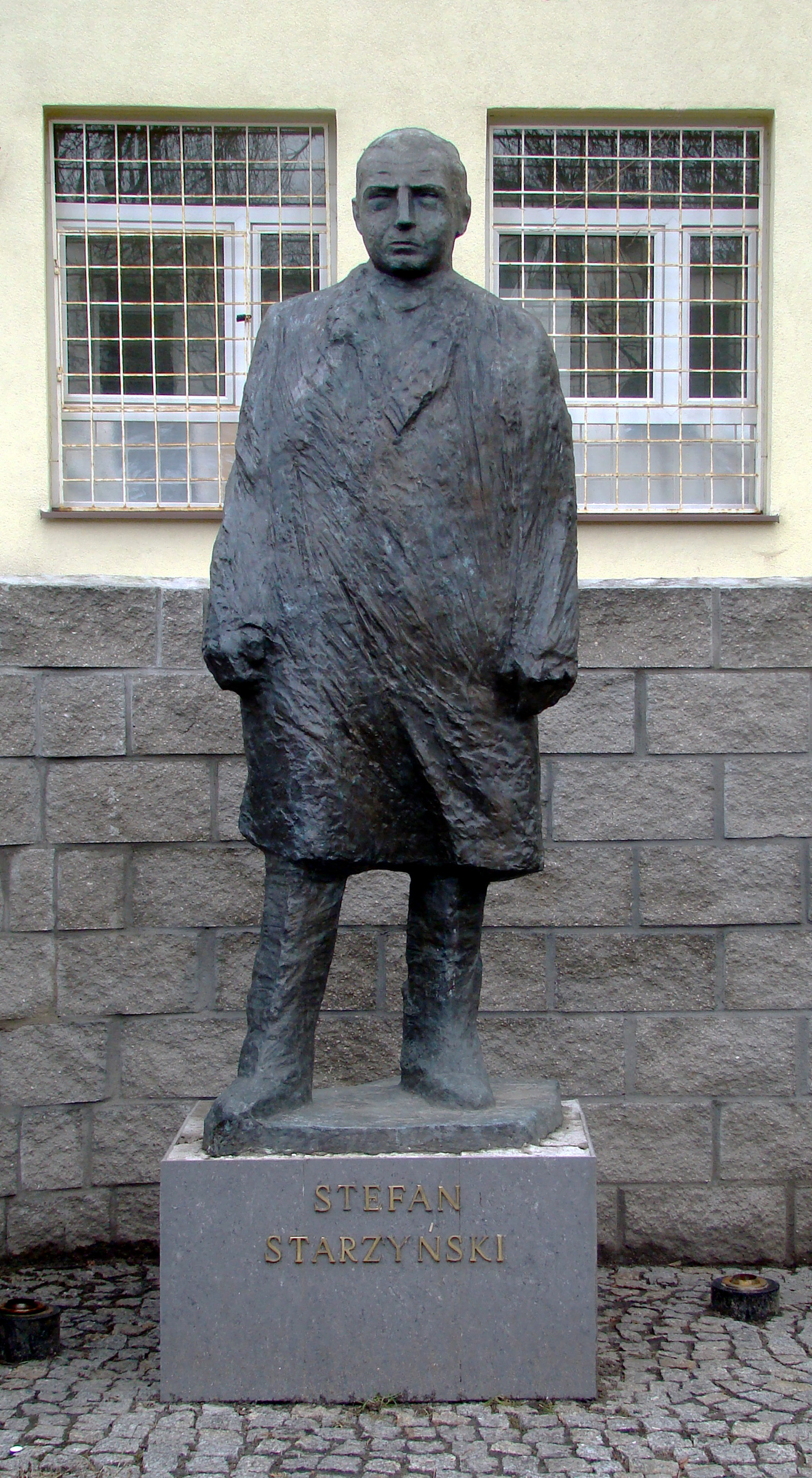
- The monument in 2011.
- Interactive map of Stefan Starzyński Monument
- Location: Saska Street, Praga-Południe, Warsaw, Poland
- Coordinates: 52°13′45.67″N 21°03′46.80″E
- Designer: Ludwika Nitschowa
- Type: Statue
- Completion date: 18 December 1980
- Opening date: 16 January 1981 (original location); 5 September 2008 (current location)
- Dedicated to: Stefan Starzyński

Stefan Starzyński Monument (Polish: Pomnik Stefana Starzyńskiego) is a monument in Warsaw, Poland, located in the district of Praga-Południe. It is placed at Saska Street, next to the entrance to the building of 143rd Primary School at 27 United States Avenue. It consists of statue depicting Stefan Starzyński, mayor of Warsaw from 1934 to 1939, who commanded the city defence during the siege of 1939 in Second World War. The monument was designed in Ludwika Nitschowa and unveiled on 16 January 1981 in the Saxon Garden. It was moved to its current location on 5 September 2008.

== History ==
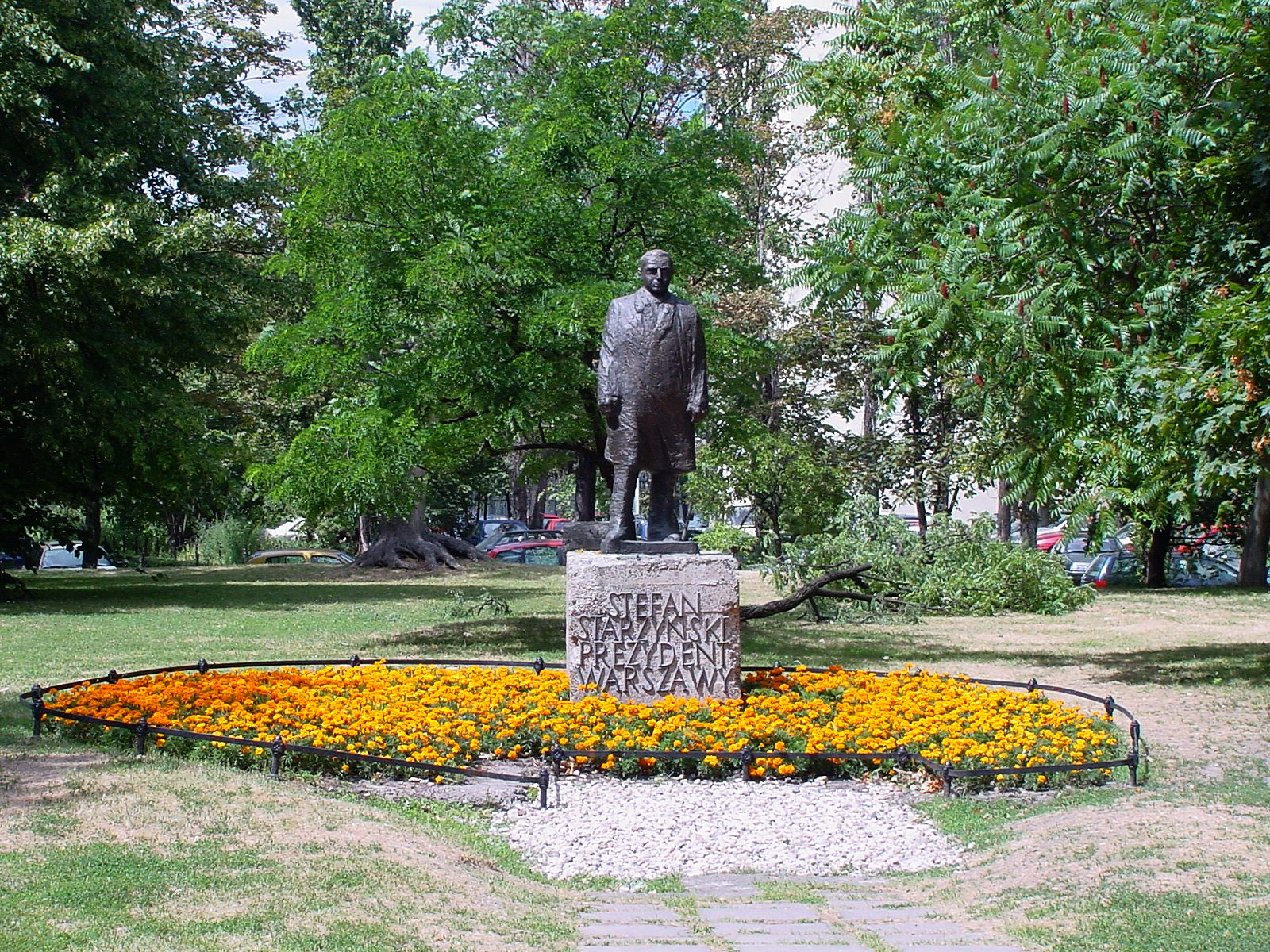
Stefan Starzyński Monument at its former location in the Saxon Garden in 2006.

The monument was commissioned to commemorate Stefan Starzyński, mayor of Warsaw from 1934 to 1939, who commanded the city defence during the siege of 1939 in Second World War. It was designed in Ludwika Nitschowa.

The design was unveiled for the first time in 1967, as part of an art exhibition in Zachęta National Gallery of Art in Warsaw. The monument was placed on 18 December 1980 in Saxon Garden in Warsaw, and unveiled on 16 January 1981. It was put on a concrete pedestal, which was sourced from materials from Brühl Palace, that was destroyed during the Second World War.

In 2002, the municipal council of Warsaw-Centre passed a resolution to relocate the monument to a different location. On 5 September 2008, it was placed at Saska Street, next to the entrance to the building of 143th Primary School at 27 United States Avenue. The original pedestal remains in the Saxon Garden.

== Characteristics ==
The monument is located in the neighbourhood of Saska Kępa in the district of Praga-Południe. It is placed at Saska Street, next to the entrance to the building of 143rd Primary School at 27 United States Avenue. It consists of a statue depicting Stefan Starzyński placed on a pedestal.

== See also ==
- Stefan Starzyński Monument (Downtown, Warsaw), another monument in Warsaw dedicated to Stefan Starzyński
- Monument to the Mayors of Great Warsaw, another monument in Warsaw dedicated to Stefan Starzyński
