= Marian Porwit =

Polish military officer (1895–1988)

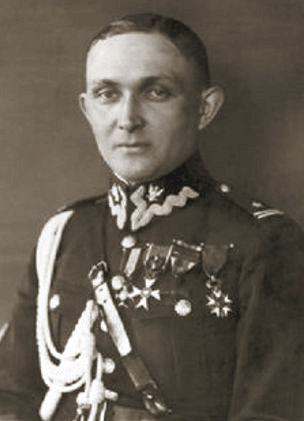
Marian Porwit in the rank of major, 1929

Marian Paweł Porwit (25 September 1895 – 26 April 1988) was a Polish military officer, a colonel of the Polish Army and a military historian. A commander of one of the sections of the Polish front during the Siege of Warsaw of 1939, after the war he became a historian known for documenting the Invasion of Poland.

Born 25 September 1895 in Gorlice (then in Austro-Hungarian Galicia), following the outbreak of the Great War Porwit joined the Polish Legions, where he served with distinction. In 1918 he joined the re-established Polish Army and fought in the Polish-Bolshevik War. In 1926 during the May Coup he supported president Stanisław Wojciechowski and the legal government of Wincenty Witos. For this reason when Józef Piłsudski forced the government to resign, Porwit's military career slowed until World War II. By 1939 he was promoted to the rank of colonel. Attached to the staff of General Walerian Czuma, Porwit became the commanding officer of the Western Area of the defense of Warsaw during the siege of 1939. The troops under his command defended the westernmost approach towards the city center from 8 to 28 September before collapsing.

Taken prisoner of war by Nazi Germany, Porwit spent the remainder of World War II in POW camps. Liberated in 1945, he moved to London, where he became a member of the Sikorski Institute. In 1946 he decided to return to Poland. He settled in Warsaw, where he continued his historical career. He died on 26 April 1988 in Warsaw.

== Awards ==
- Golden Cross of the Order Virtuti Militari (Poland)
- Silver Cross of the Order Virtuti Militari (Poland)
- Officer's Cross of the Order of Polonia Restituta (Poland)
- Cross of Valour (Poland) — 4 times
- Cross of Merit (Poland)
- Knight Cross of the Légion d'honneur (France)
- Big Silver Bravery Medal — 2 times (Austria-Hungary)
- Small Silver Bravery Medal (Austria-Hungary)
- Bronze Bravery Medal (Austria-Hungary)
