= Siege of Warsaw (1939) =

Part of the German invasion of Poland

- Part of the Invasion of Poland of World War II
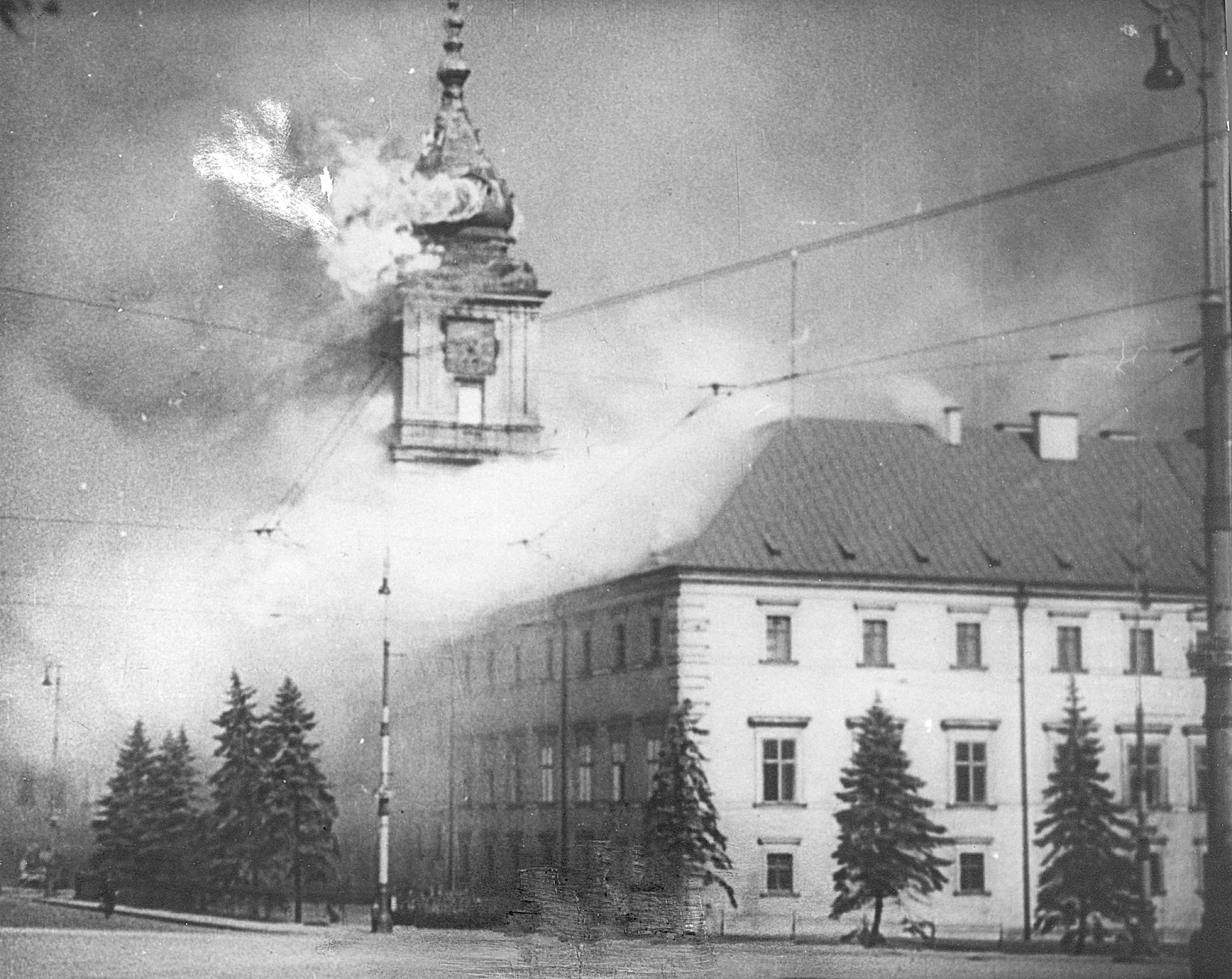
- A fire breakout at the Royal Castle, Warsaw following heavy air strikes by the Luftwaffe.
Date	8–28 September 1939 (21 days)
Location	Warsaw, Poland
Result	German victory
Territorial changes	German occupation until 1945

Belligerents
Germany	Poland; Service for Poland's Victory (from 27 September)

Commanders and leaders
(Nazi Germany) Johannes Blaskowitz; (Nazi Germany) Georg von Küchler; (Nazi Germany) Werner von Fritsch †; (Nazi Germany) Walter Petzel	(Second Polish Republic) Walerian Czuma; (Second Polish Republic) Juliusz Zulauf (POW); (Second Polish Republic) Juliusz Rómmel (POW); (Second Polish Republic) Marian Porwit (POW); (Second Polish Republic) Tadeusz Kutrzeba; (Second Polish Republic) Stefan Starzyński

Units involved
4th Panzer Division; Luftwaffe	Warsaw Army; Prussian Army Supported by: Polish Air Force

Strength
175,000 soldiers 1,000 artillery pieces 1,200 aircraft 220 tanks	Peak strength: 124,000-140,000 soldiers 86 anti-aircraft guns 64 artillery pieces 33 tanks Pursuit Brigade: 54 aircraft

Casualties and losses
5,000 killed 13,000 wounded 80 tanks 80-100 aircraft	5,000 killed 13,000-16,000 wounded 140,000 captured 80 tanks and tankettes 63 aircraft
- 18,000 civilians killed

The Siege of Warsaw was fought between the Polish Warsaw Army (Polish: Armia Warszawska, Armia Warszawa) garrisoned and entrenched in Warsaw and the invading German Army.

It began with huge aerial bombardments initiated by the Luftwaffe starting on September 1, 1939 following the German invasion of Poland. Land fighting started on September 8, when the first German armored units reached the Wola district and south-western suburbs of the city. Despite German radio broadcasts claiming to have captured Warsaw, the initial German attack was repelled and soon afterwards Warsaw was placed under siege. The siege lasted until September 28, when the Polish garrison, commanded under General Walerian Czuma, officially capitulated. The following day approximately 140,000 Polish troops left the city and were taken as prisoners of war. On October 1 the Wehrmacht entered Warsaw, which started a period of German occupation that lasted until the devastating Warsaw Uprising (Note: During which the Polish Resistance managed to retake most of the area in and around Warsaw for several weeks during the summer of 1944, before being once again forced to surrender after allied assistance proved inadequate. Though it resulted in the near total destruction of the city, the Warsaw Uprising was the only interruption of the German occupation of the city prior to the Soviet conquest in January 1945) and later until January 17, 1945, when the Wehrmacht troops abandoned the city due to the advance of Soviet forces.

Around 18,000 civilians of Warsaw perished during the siege. As a result of the air bombardments, 10% of the city's buildings were entirely destroyed and further 40% were heavily damaged.

== History ==
=== Heavy bombardments ===
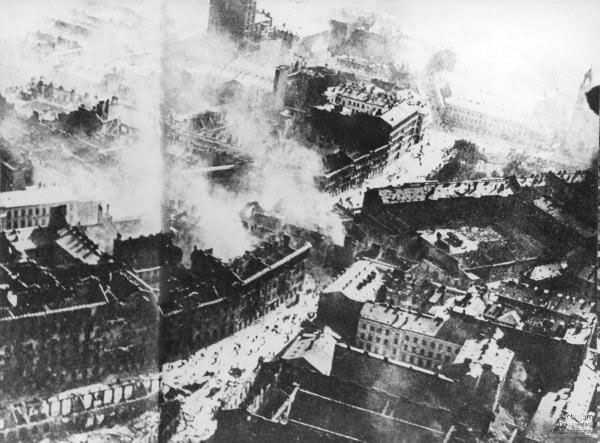
Warsaw's downtown burning after an air raid by the Luftwaffe

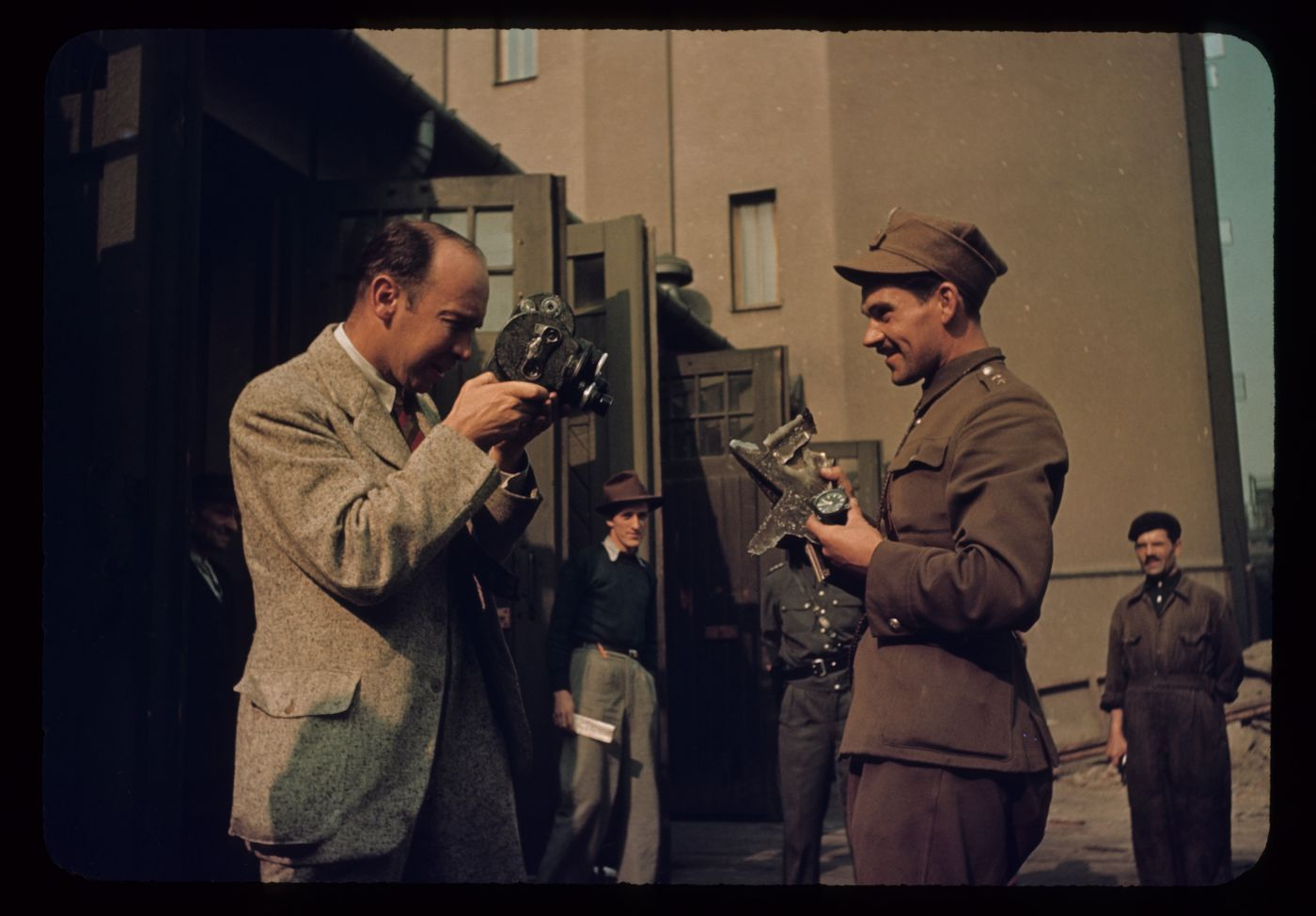
Polish Army soldier holding last remaining part of destroyed German bomber Heinkel He 111 in Warsaw, September 1939 (Kodachrome photography).

From the very first hours of World War II, Warsaw, the capital of Poland, was a target of an unrestricted aerial bombardment campaign initiated by the German Luftwaffe, which was controlled by Hermann Göring. Apart from the military facilities such as infantry barracks and the Okęcie airport and aircraft factory, the German pilots also targeted civilian facilities such as water works, hospitals, market places and schools, which resulted in heavy human casualties that possibly led to the early surrender by lowering of morale of the Polish army defending the city.

The anti-aircraft defence of the capital was divided into active and passive parts. The former was composed mostly of units of the Pursuit Brigade (Brygada Pościgowa) under Colonel Stefan Pawlikowski, and anti-aircraft artillery and anti-aircraft machine guns detachments under Colonel Kazimierz Baran. The Pursuit Brigade was equipped with 54 fighter aircraft, mostly the obsolete PZL P.7 and PZL P.11 types. The AA artillery had 86 pieces of anti-aircraft artillery, as well as an unknown number of other anti-aircraft machine guns. The latter was composed mostly of fire-fighter brigades and volunteers and was supervised by Colonel Tadeusz Bogdanowicz and Julian Kulski, the deputy president.

Initially the air defence of Warsaw was fairly successful and by September 6, 1939, the Pursuit Brigade had shot down 43 German aircraft, while anti-aircraft artillery had shot down a similar number of German bombers. There were also 9 unconfirmed victories and 20 damaged German planes. However, the brigade also suffered heavy losses, and by September 7 it had lost over 38 pieces of equipment, or approximately 70% of its initial strength, which greatly contributed to an early surrender.

The AA defence started to crumble when on September 5 by order of the military authorities 11 AA batteries were withdrawn from Warsaw towards the eastern cities of Lublin, Brześć and Lwów. Furthermore, as the war progressed, the German high command redirected more bombers to attack the city, especially the historical old town, the Royal Castle, Warsaw and other iconic monuments, significant to the Polish nation and its capital. At the peak of the initial bombing campaign on September 10, there were more than 70 German bombers above Warsaw. During that day, nicknamed "Bloody Sunday", there were 17 consecutive bombing raids.

=== Eve of the battle ===
On September 3, the forces of German 4th Panzer Division under Major general Georg-Hans Reinhardt managed to break through positions of the Polish Łódź Army near Częstochowa and started their march towards the river Vistula and Warsaw. The same day Polish Commander-in-chief, Marshal of Poland Edward Rydz-Śmigły ordered the creation of an improvised Command of the Defence of Warsaw (Dowództwo Obrony Warszawy). General Walerian Czuma, the head of the Border Guard (Straż Graniczna), became its commander and Colonel Tadeusz Tomaszewski its Chief of staff.

Initially the forces under the command of General Czuma were very limited. Most of the city authorities withdrew together with a large part of the police forces, fire fighters and the military garrison. Warsaw was left with only four battalions of infantry and one battery of artillery. Also, the spokesman of the garrison of Warsaw issued a communique in which he ordered all young men to leave Warsaw. To coordinate civilian efforts and counter the panic that started in Warsaw, Czuma appointed the president of Warsaw Stefan Starzyński as the Civilian Commissar of Warsaw. Starzyński started to organize the Civil Guard to replace the evacuated police forces and the fire fighters. He also ordered all members of the city's administration to return to their posts. In his daily radio releases he asked all civilians to construct barricades and anti-tank barriers on the streets and at the outskirts of Warsaw. On September 7 the 40th Infantry Regiment "Children of Lwów" (commanded by Lt.Col. Józef Kalandyk) – transiting through Warsaw towards previously assigned positions with the Army Pomorze – was stopped and joined the defense of Warsaw.

=== Initial clashes ===
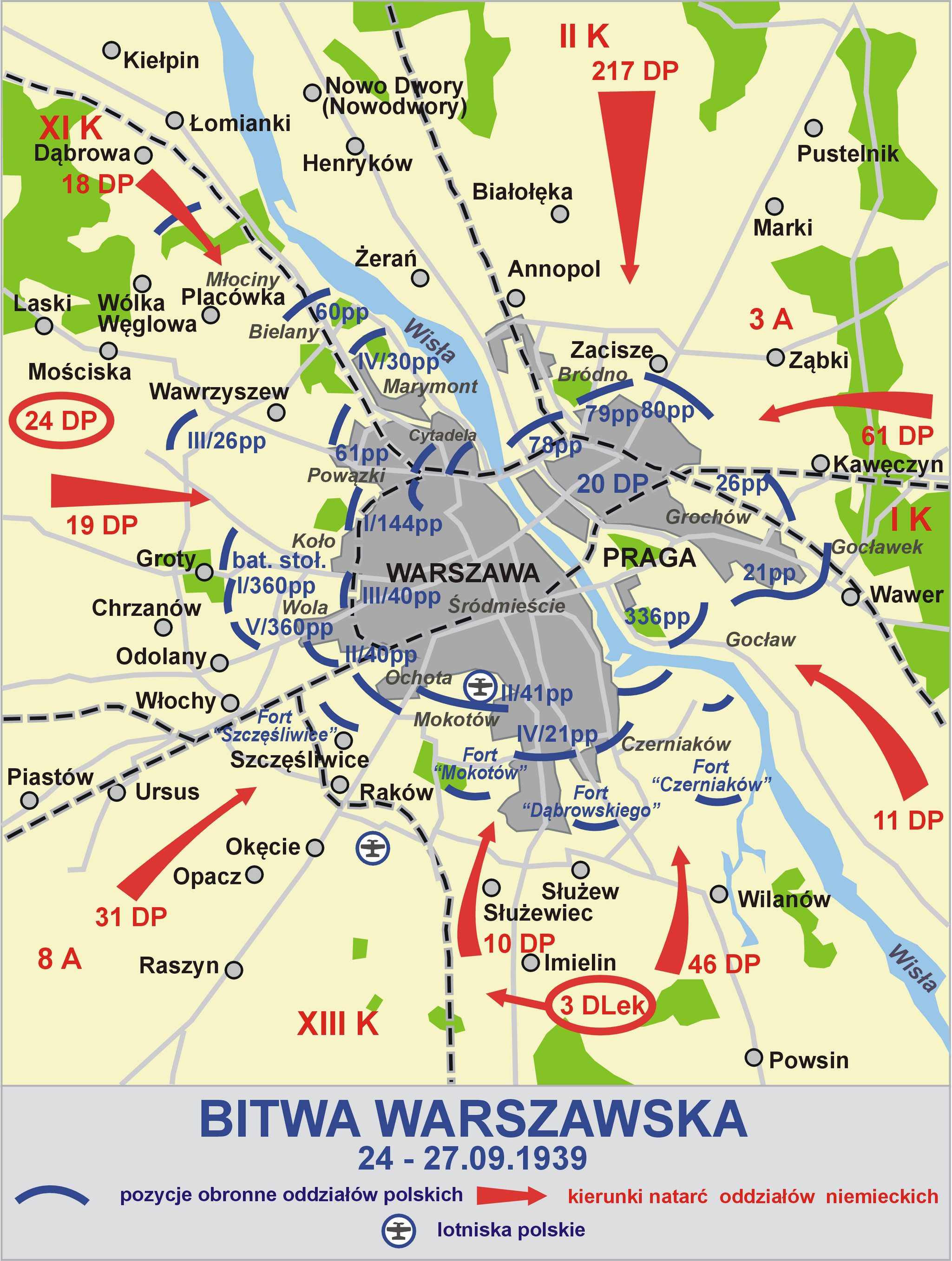
The position of Polish and German forces during the siege

The field fortifications were constructed mostly to the west of the city limits. Gradually, the forces of General Walerian Czuma were reinforced with volunteers composed of mostly civilians, including women and children, as well as rearguard troops and units withdrawing from the front. On the morning of September 8, the suburbs of Grójec, Radziejowice, Nadarzyn, Raszyn and Piaseczno were captured by forces of German XVI Panzer Corps. At exactly 5pm the forces of the German 4th Panzer Division attempted an assault on Warsaw's western borough of Ochota. The assault was repulsed and the German forces suffered heavy casualties with many Panzer I and Panzer II tanks lost. The following day, the 4th Panzer Division was reinforced with artillery and Motorized infantry, and began another assault towards Ochota and Wola. The well-placed Polish 75 mm anti-tank guns firing at point-blank range, and the barricades erected on main streets, successfully managed to repel all initiated assaults and unexpected attacks.

One of the barricades erected at the crossing of Opaczewska and Grójecka streets was defended by the 4th company of the 40th "Children of Lwów" Regiment. After the war a monument was built on the spot to commemorate the battle. On several occasions lack of armament had to be made up for by ingenuity. One of the streets leading towards the city center was covered with turpentine from a nearby factory. When the German tanks approached, the liquid was ignited and the tanks were destroyed without a single shot fired.

The German forces suffered heavy casualties and had to retreat westward to help thwart the Bzura River counter-offensive. The 4th Panzer Division alone lost approximately 80 tanks out of the approximately 220 that took part in the assault.

=== Second phase ===
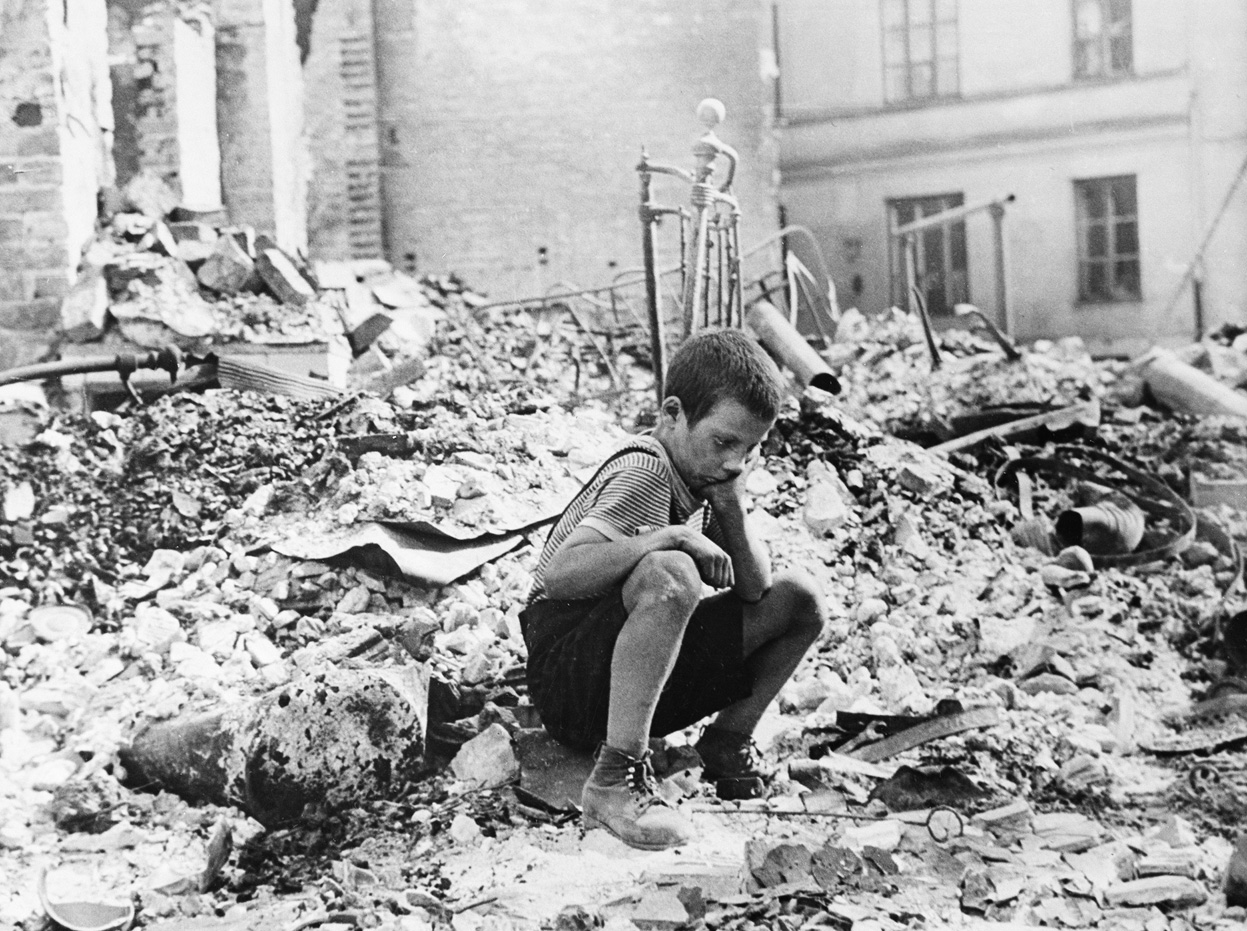
Survivor of the bombing of Warsaw, photographed by Julien Bryan

By then General Czuma had gathered an equivalent of 2 infantry divisions under his command. His forces were supported by 64 pieces of artillery and 33 tanks (27 of Vickers E, 7TP and R-35 and 6 TK-3 and TKS tankettes). On September 8 the Commander-in-Chief, Marshal Edward Rydz-Śmigły ordered the creation of an improvised Warsaw Army (Armia Warszawa) under General Juliusz Rómmel. The newly created force was composed of the forces defending Warsaw and Modlin Fortress, as well as all Polish units defending the Narew and the Vistula between Warsaw and Pilica river lines. General Czuma continued to be the commander of the Warsaw Defence Force, which he split into two sectors: East (Praga district) under Lt.Col. Julian Janowski and West under Colonel Marian Porwit.

The Army Poznań commanded by General Tadeusz Kutrzeba, and Army Pomorze under General Władysław Bortnowski started an offensive on the left flank of the German forces advancing towards Warsaw. As a result of this offensive that later became known as the Battle of Bzura, German commanders withdrew the 4th Panzer Division and sent it to counter the Polish threat near Kutno. Its positions were replaced by forces of a weakened German 31st Infantry Division. In this sense the desperate attempt to buy time for organising a defence of Warsaw was a success. The defenders of the city were joined by various units of the routed Prusy Army. In addition, several new units were created in Warsaw out of reserve centres of Warsaw-based 8th Polish Infantry Division and 36th "Academic Legion" Infantry Regiment.

On September 11 the Polish Commander in Chief ordered that Warsaw was to be defended at all costs, despite the possible heavy casualties and civilian losses. The following day the forces of German 3rd Army (under General Georg von Küchler) broke through Polish lines along the Narew river and started its march southwards to cut off Warsaw from the east. It was assaulted by cavalry units under Władysław Anders, but after heavy fighting the Polish counter-offensive failed and the forces were withdrawn to the south. Other Polish units fighting under General Juliusz Zulauf near the Narew River area retreated and reached Warsaw on September 14. They were incorporated as the core of the defence forces of the borough of Praga district.

On September 15 the German forces reached Warsaw from the east and the capital of Poland was under siege. Only a strip of land along the Vistula leading towards the Kampinos Forest and Modlin Fortress was still controlled by Polish forces. The defence of the Modlin fortress was an important relief to the defenders of Warsaw.

=== Siege of Warsaw ===
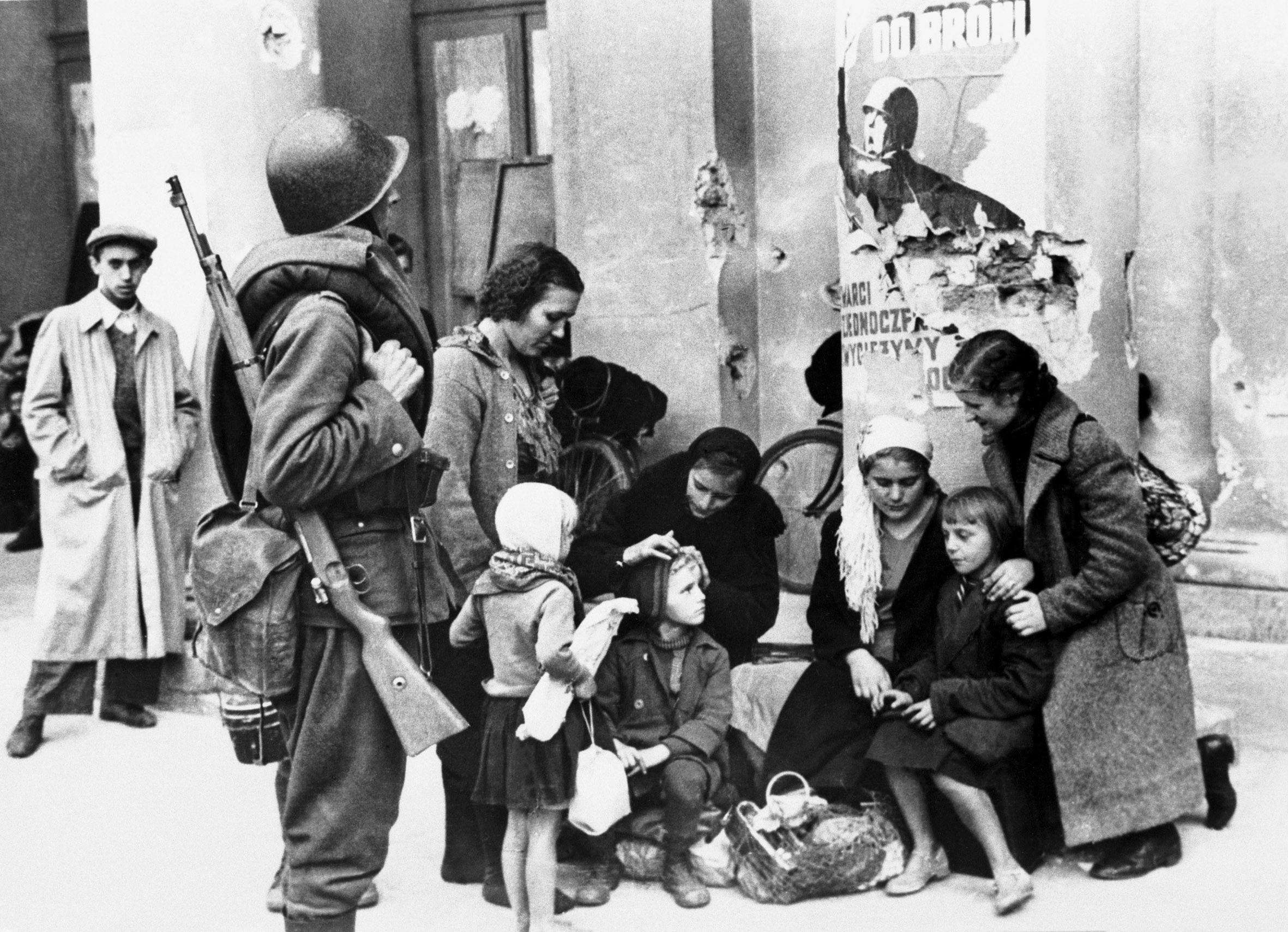
Civilian refugees in Warsaw

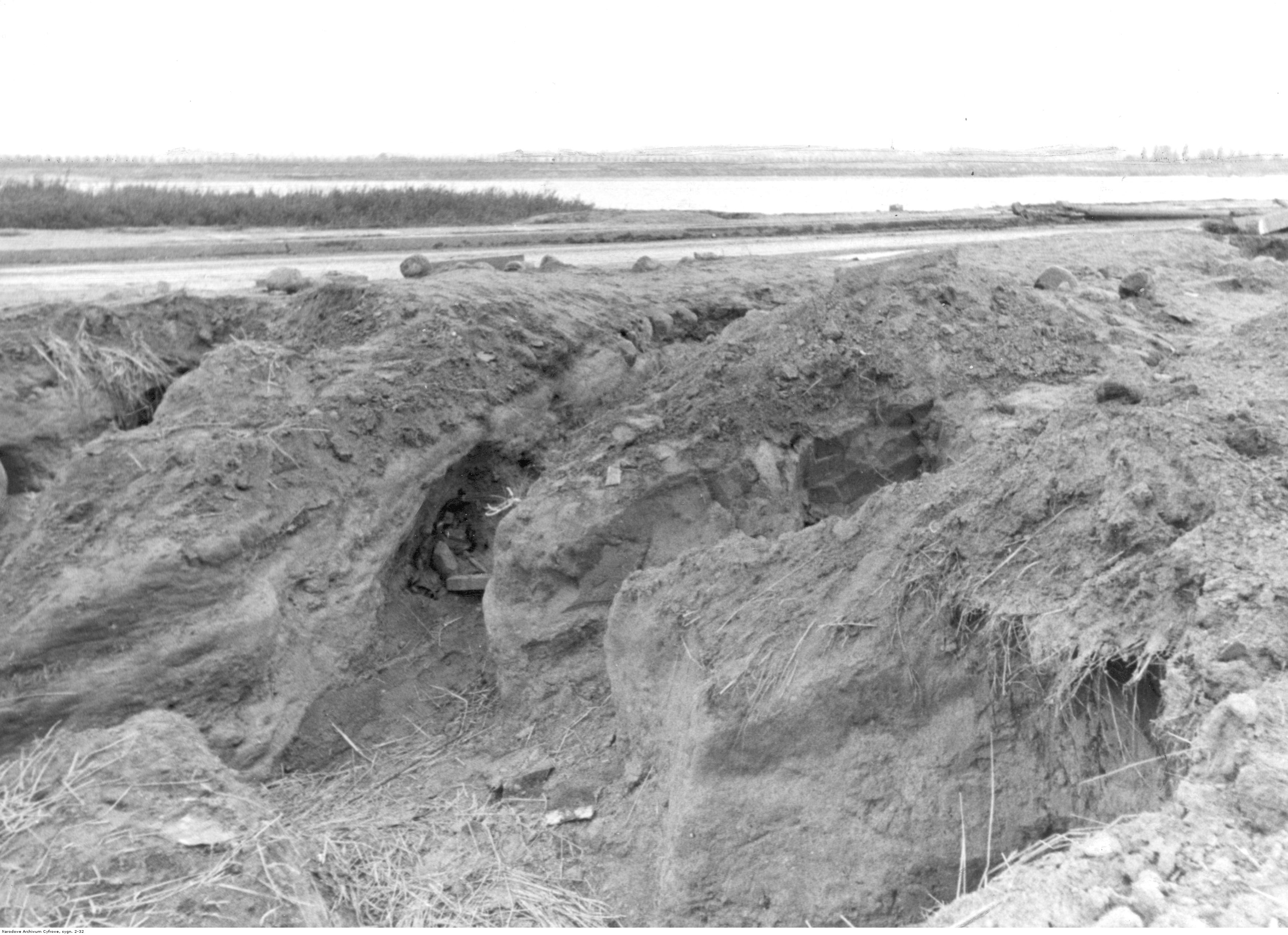
German trenches on the outskirts of Warsaw, on the east bank of the Vistula river.

On 15 September, the German Third Army from Army Group North attacked Praga. They attacked from both sides of the Vistula.

After heavy fighting for the Grochów area the German 23rd Infantry Regiment was annihilated by the Polish defenders of the 21st "Children of Warsaw" Infantry Regiment under colonel (later promoted to general) Stanisław Sosabowski.

After the Battle of Bzura ended, the remnants of the Poznań Army and the Pomorze Army broke through the German encirclement and arrived in Warsaw and Modlin between 18–21 September from the Kampinos Forest. After that the forces of the defenders amounted to approximately 140,000 soldiers. The German forces preparing for an all-out assault numbered 13 divisions with one thousand artillery pieces. On September 22 the last lines of communication between Warsaw and Modlin were cut by German forces reaching the Vistula.

As preparation for the storming, the city was shelled day and night with artillery and aerial bombardment. Among the guns used were heavy railway guns and mortars. Two entire air fleets took part in the air raids against both civilian and military targets. After September 20 the forces on the eastern bank of the Vistula started daily attacks on the Praga suburb. All were successfully counter-attacked by the Polish forces. On September 24 all German units concentrated around Warsaw were put under command of general Johannes Blaskowitz

An initial German attack took place on 23 September, which was successfully repulsed. On September 25 the next attack started with an artillery and air bombardment, including 1,200 aircraft. This so-called "Black Monday" became a legend in the history of Warsaw.

The following day in the early morning the general assault was started on all fronts of surrounded Warsaw. Western parts of the city were attacked by 5 German divisions (10th, 18th, 19th, 31st and 46th) while the eastern part was attacked by 4 divisions (11th, 32nd, 61st and 217th). The attack was supported by approximately 70 batteries of field artillery, 80 batteries of heavy artillery and two entire air fleets (1st and 4th), which bombarded the city continuously causing heavy losses in the civilian population. On 26 September, the Forts of Mokotów, Dąbrowski and Czerniaków fell to the German assault.

=== Capitulation and surrender ===
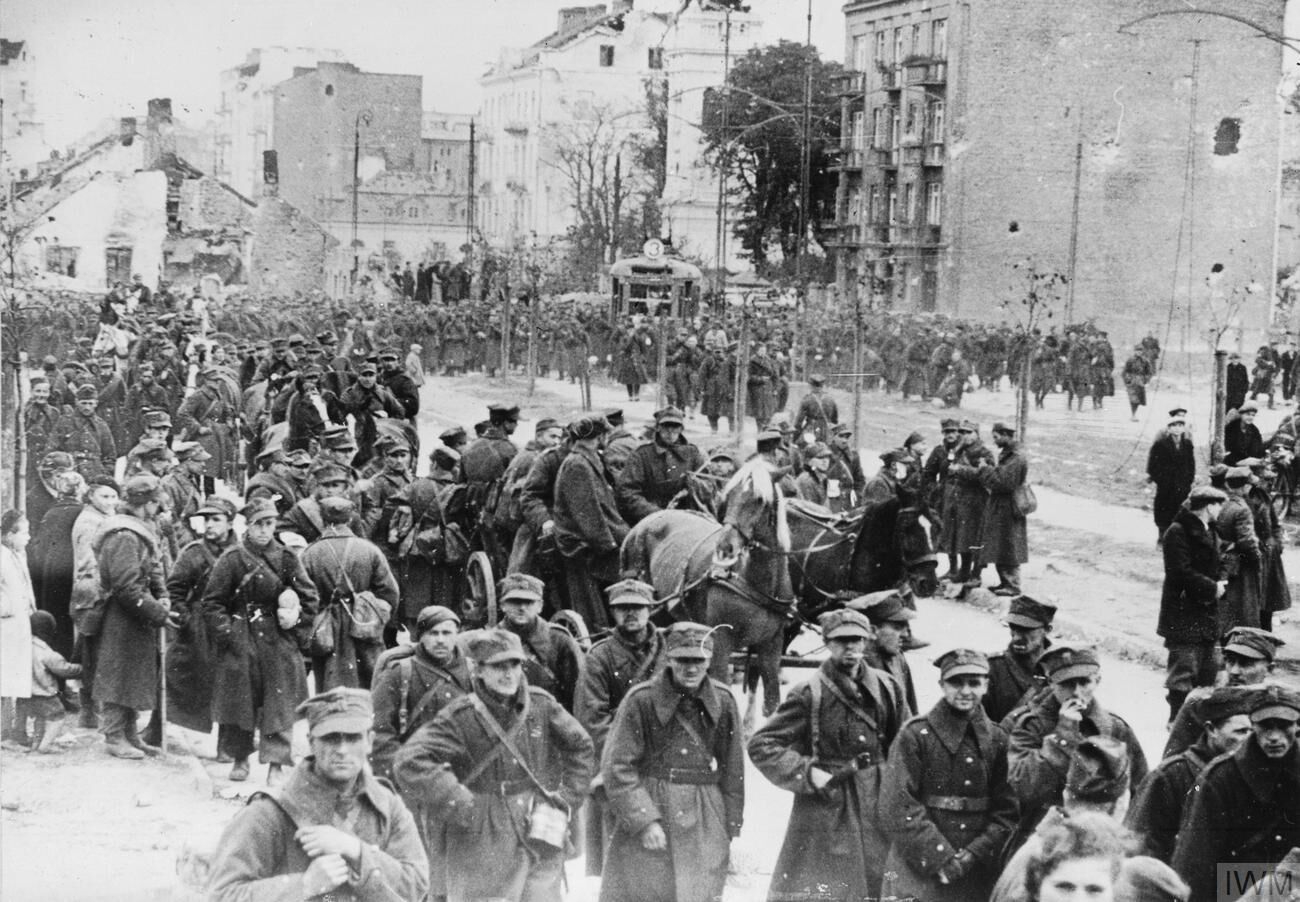
Polish soldiers march into German captivity on 30 September, following the capitulation

General Czuma managed to gather enough forces and war material to successfully defend the city for several weeks longer. However, the situation of the civilian inhabitants of Warsaw became increasingly tragic. Constant bombardment of civilian facilities, lack of food and medical supplies resulted in heavy casualties among the city's population.

The water works were destroyed by German bombers and all boroughs of Warsaw experienced a lack of both potable water and water with which to extinguish the fires caused by the constant bombardment. Also, the strategic situation became very difficult. The Soviet Union's entry into the war and lack of support from the Western Allies made the defence of the city pointless and heavily demotivated the volunteers in participating in any further military actions.

On September 26, Army Warsaw General Juliusz Rómmel, started capitulation talks with the German commander. On September 27, at 12:00 a ceasefire agreement was signed and all fighting halted. Soon afterwards, Warsaw capitulated. Several units declined to put down their weapons and cease fire, and their commanding officers had to be visited by generals Czuma and Rómmel personally.

On September 29, the garrison of Warsaw started to hide or destroy their heavy armament. Some of the hidden war material was later used during the Warsaw Uprising. On September 30, the evacuation of Polish forces to German prisoner of war camps started and, the following day, German units entered the capital. The city was occupied until January 17, 1945.

== Opposing forces ==
Polish Army
	Division or Brigade	Regiments	Area
"Odcinek Zachód" (Western Warsaw) Porwit	"Zbiorcza" Cavalry Brigade; Abraham	elements of Podolian, Greater Poland and Pomeranian Cavalry Brigades
"Odcinek Zachód" (Western Warsaw) Porwit	13th Infantry Division (two regiments were detached in central Poland); Zubosz-Kaliński	Volunteer Workers' Brigade; 43rd "Bayonne Legion" Infantry Regiment	Żoliborz
"Odcinek Zachód" (Western Warsaw) Porwit	15th Infantry Division; Przyjałkowski	59th "Wielkopolski" Infantry Regiment; 61st Infantry Regiment; 62nd Infantry Regiment elements of 4th, 16th and 26th Inf.Div.	Powązki
"Odcinek Zachód" (Western Warsaw) Porwit	25th Infantry Division; Alter	60th "Wielkopolski" Infantry Regiment elements of 14th and 17th Inf.Div.	Wola
"Odcinek Wschód" (Praga) Zulauf	5th Infantry Division; Zulauf	26th Infantry Regiment	Utrata
"Odcinek Wschód" (Praga) Zulauf	20th Infantry Division; Liszka-Lawicz (Northern Praga)	78th Infantry Regiment; 79th Infantry Regiment; 80th Infantry Regiment	Bródno; Pelcowizna; Elsnerów
"Odcinek Wschód" (Praga) Zulauf	44th Infantry Division; Żongołowicz (Southern Praga)
"Odcinek Wschód" (Praga) Zulauf	8th Infantry Division (two regiments were in Modlin); Wyrwa-Furgalski	21st "Children of Warsaw" Infantry Regiment; Sosabowski	Grochów
"Odcinek Wschód" (Praga) Zulauf		1st "Defenders of Praga" Infantry Regiment (improvised); Milian	Saska Kępa, Gocław
"Odcinek Wschód" (Praga) Zulauf		2nd "Defenders of Praga" Infantry Regiment (improvised); Kotowski	Grochów

Wehrmacht
Corps	Division or Brigade	Area
8th Army (against Western Warsaw) Blaskowitz	X Corps Ulex	24th Infantry Division; Olbricht
30th Infantry Division von Briesen
XII Corps von Weichs	10th Infantry Division von Cochenhausen
17th Infantry Division; Loch
SS Leibstandarte "Adolf Hitler"; Dietrich.
3rd Army (against Praga) von Küchler	I Corps Petzel	"Kempf" Panzer Division; Kempf
11th Infantry Division; Bock
61st Infantry Division; Hänicke
II Corps Strauß	3rd Infantry Division; Lichel
32nd Infantry Division; Böhme
Luftwaffe Göring	1st Air Fleet Kesselring
4th Air Fleet Lohr

== Gallery ==
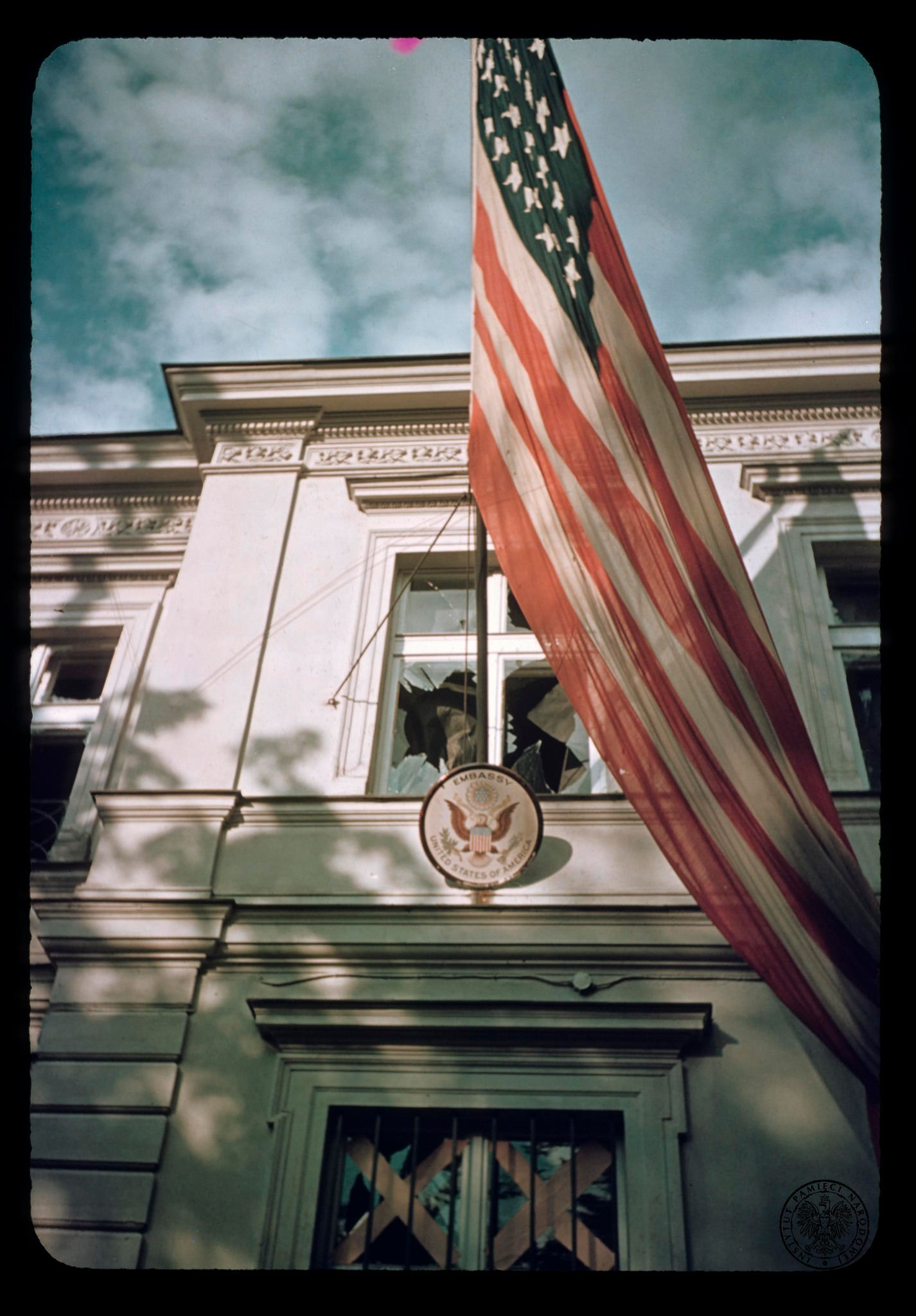
American embassy in Warsaw and visible shattered window during the German air raid.

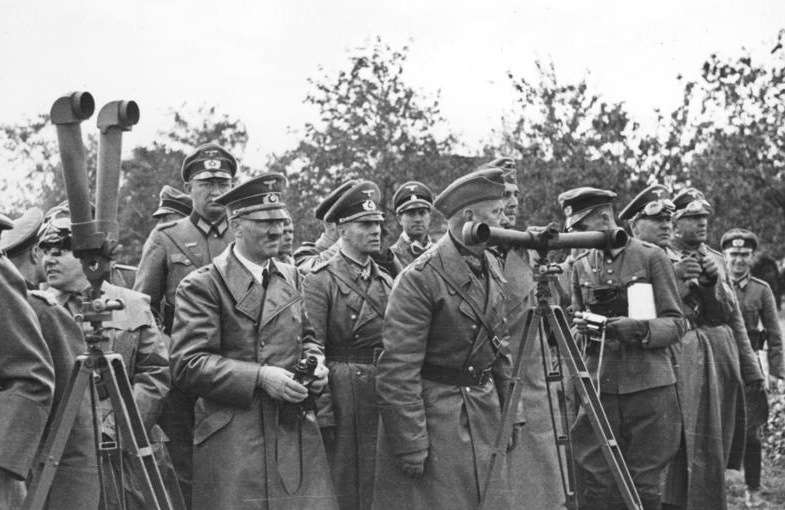
Adolf Hitler, Walter von Reichenau, Erwin Rommel and Martin Bormann observing the siege of Warsaw.

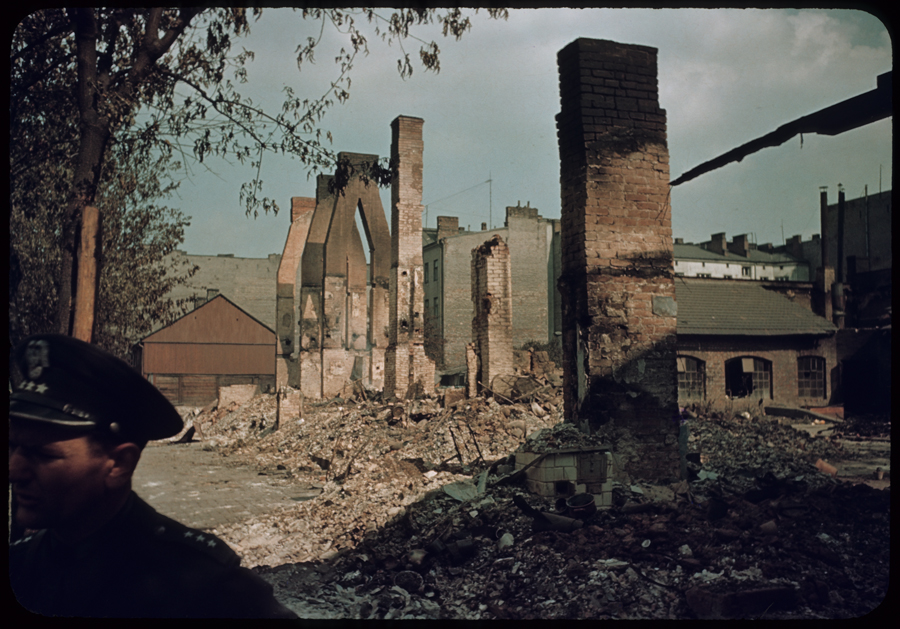
The results of German bombardment in Warsaw

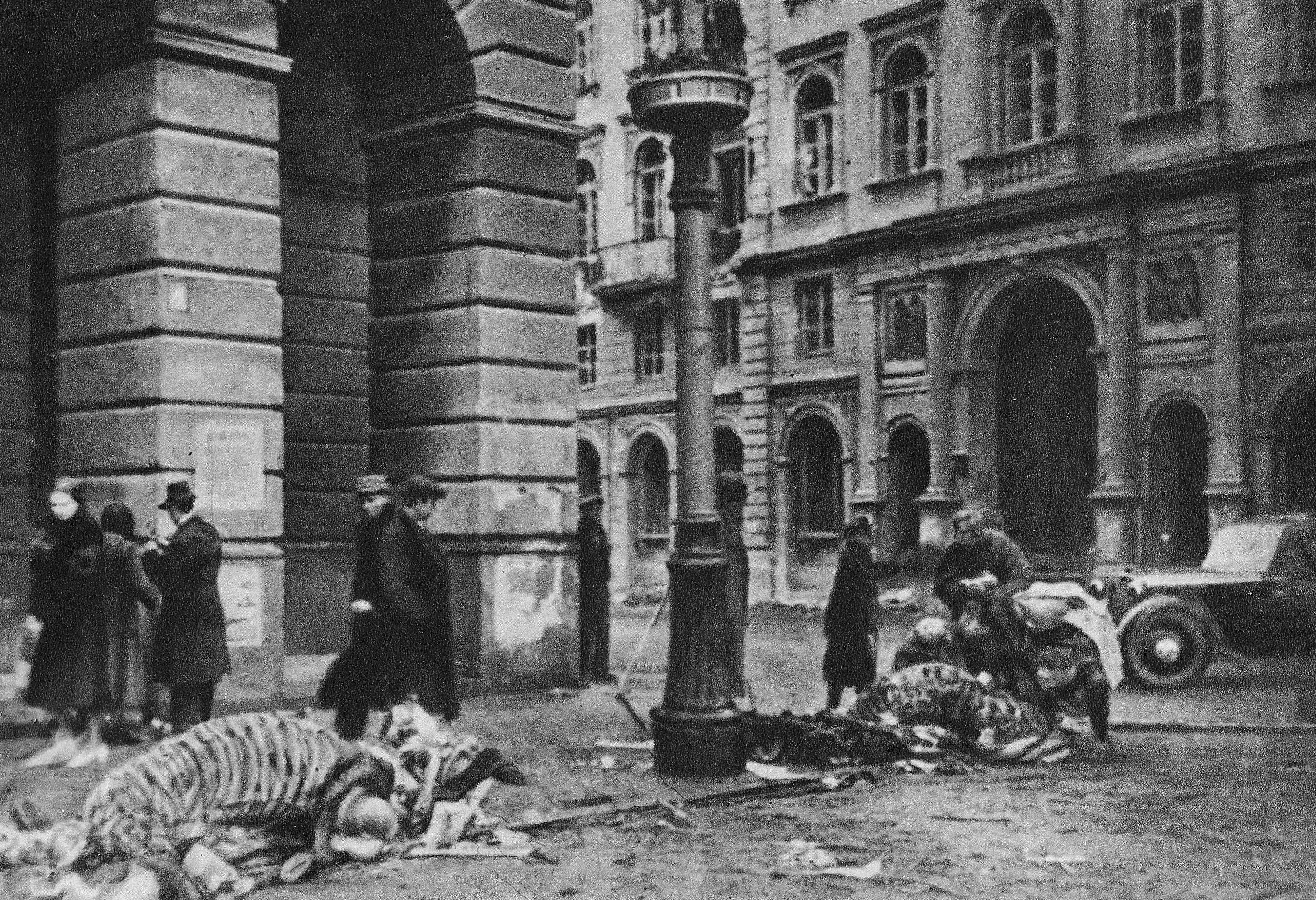
Starving citizens taking meat from the remains of dead horses on Nowy Świat Street near the intersection with Staszic Palace

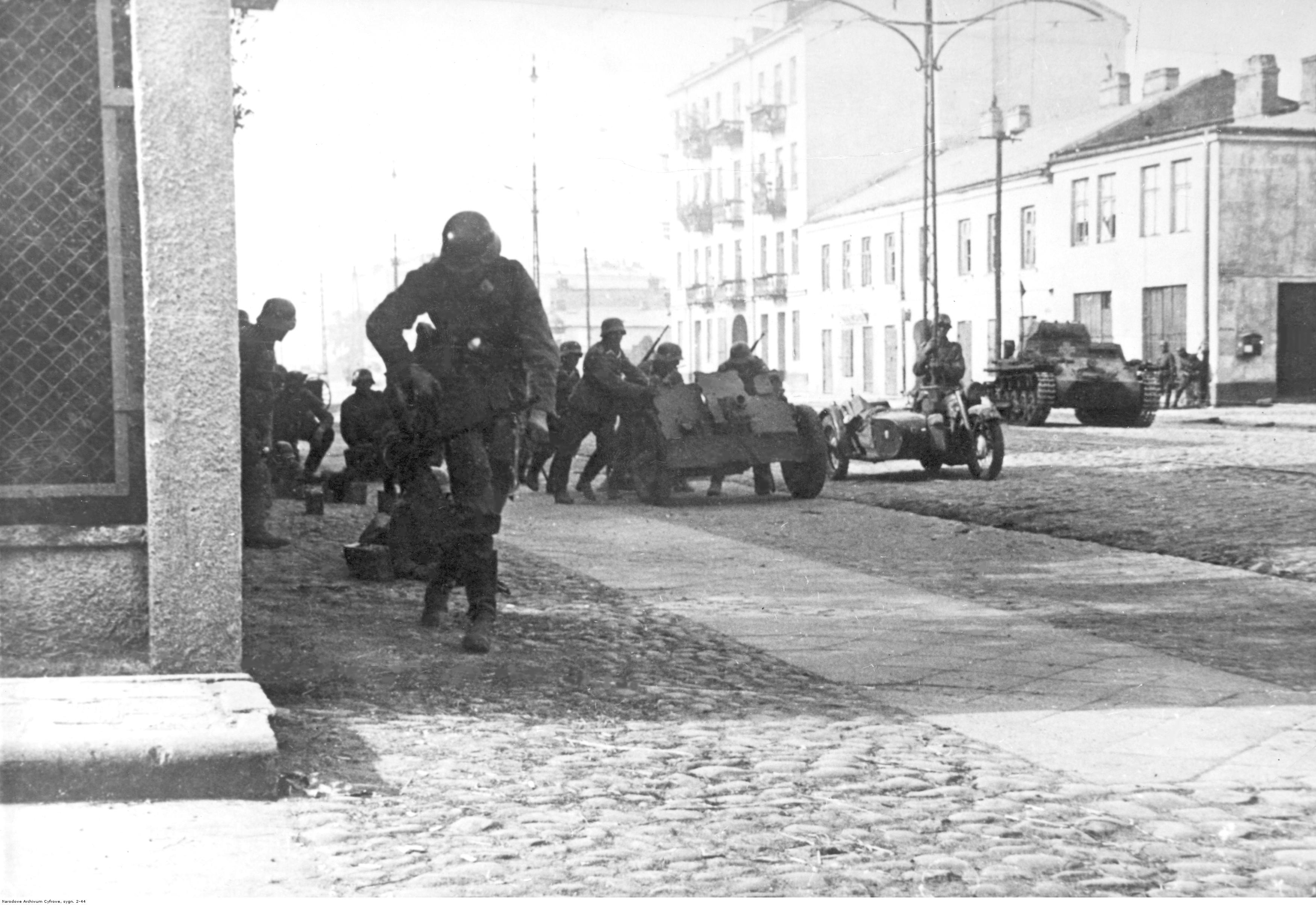
German tanks and motorized infantry on Grójecka str. between Siewierska str. and Przemyska str. PzKpfw I tank and a 7.5 cm le.IG 18 gun are visible.

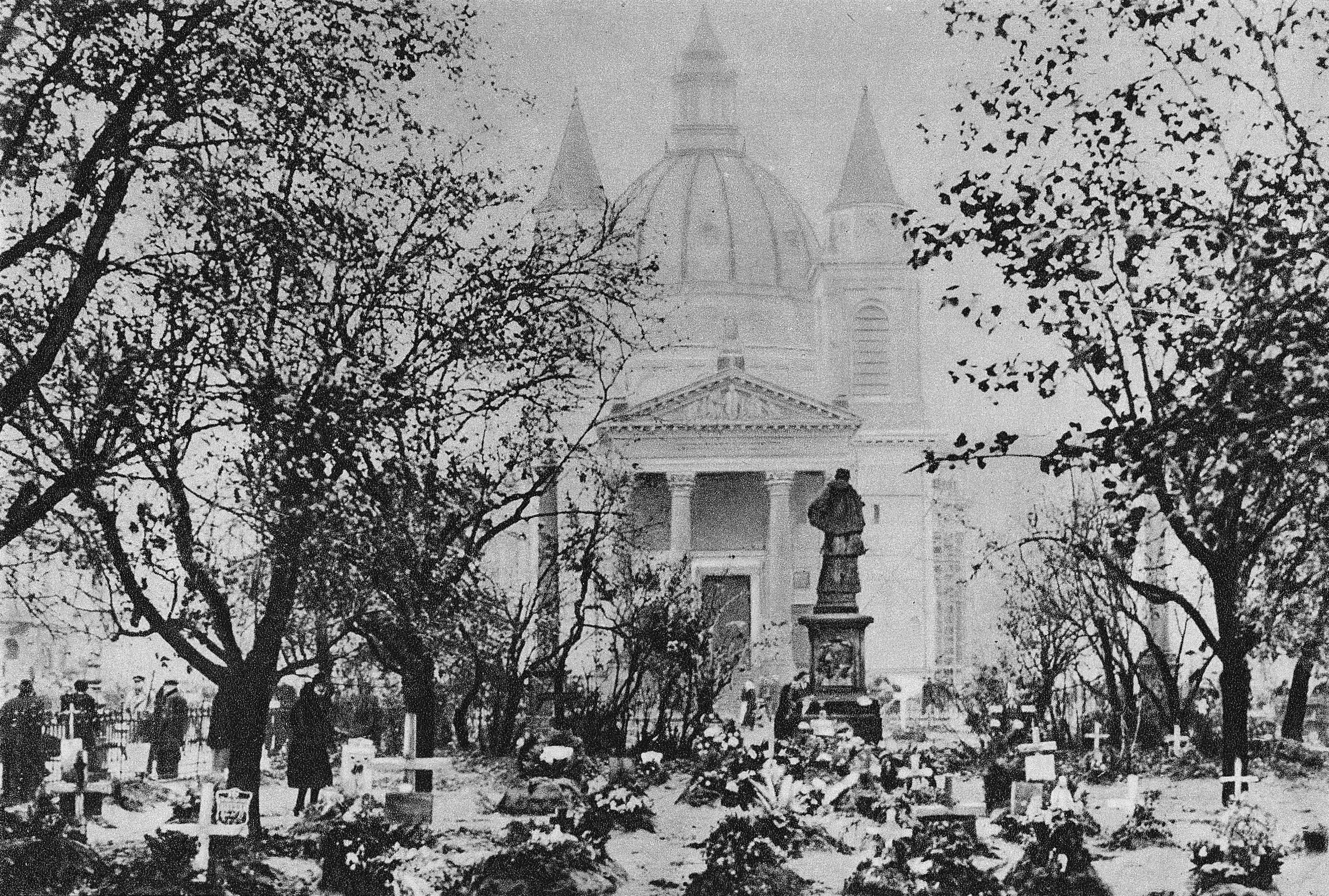
Graves of soldiers on Three Crosses Square that perished during the siege and had to be immediately buried to prevent the spreading of diseases

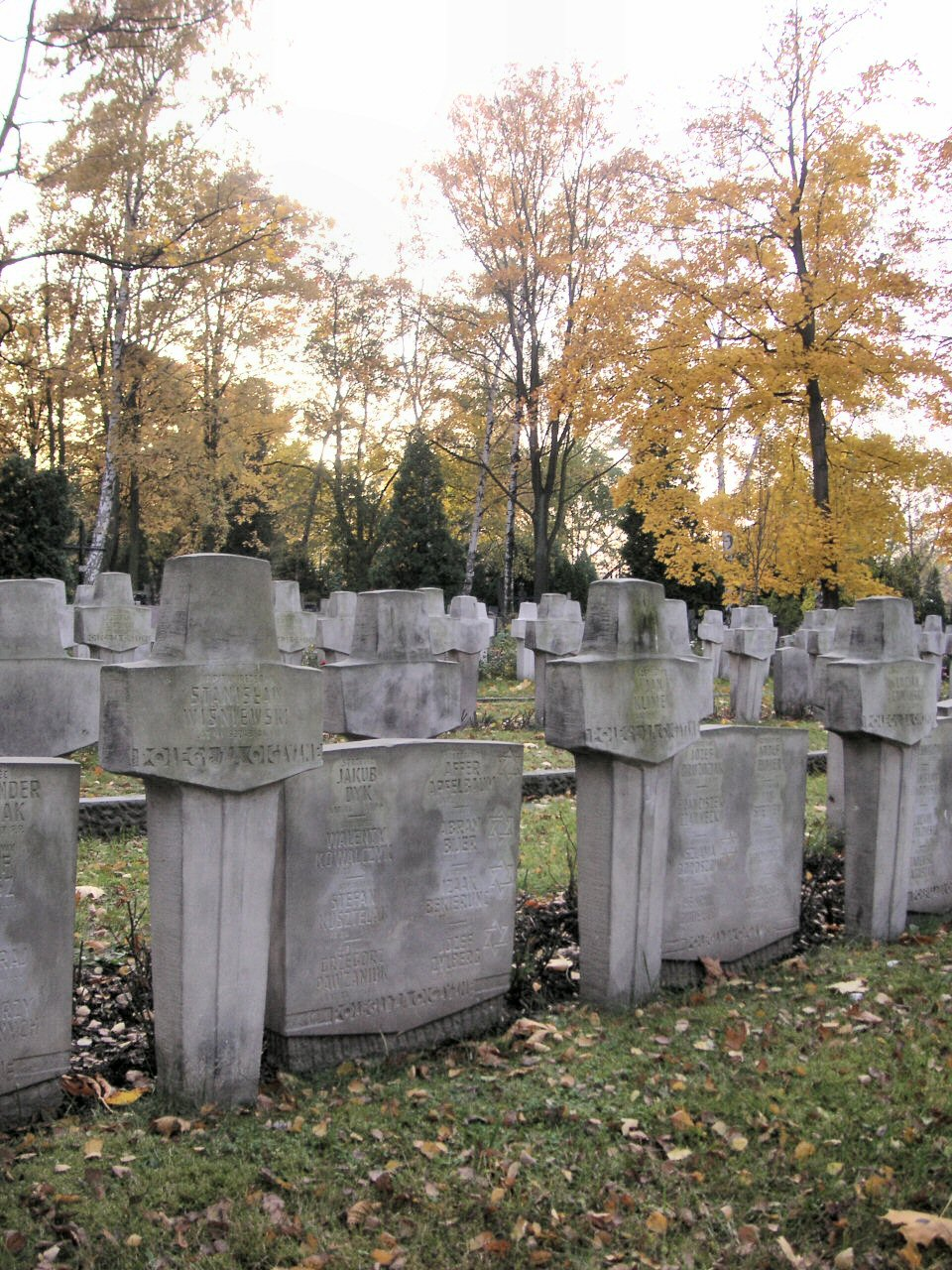
Tombstones of Polish Jews who fell during the siege of Warsaw in 1939 among their gentile colleagues

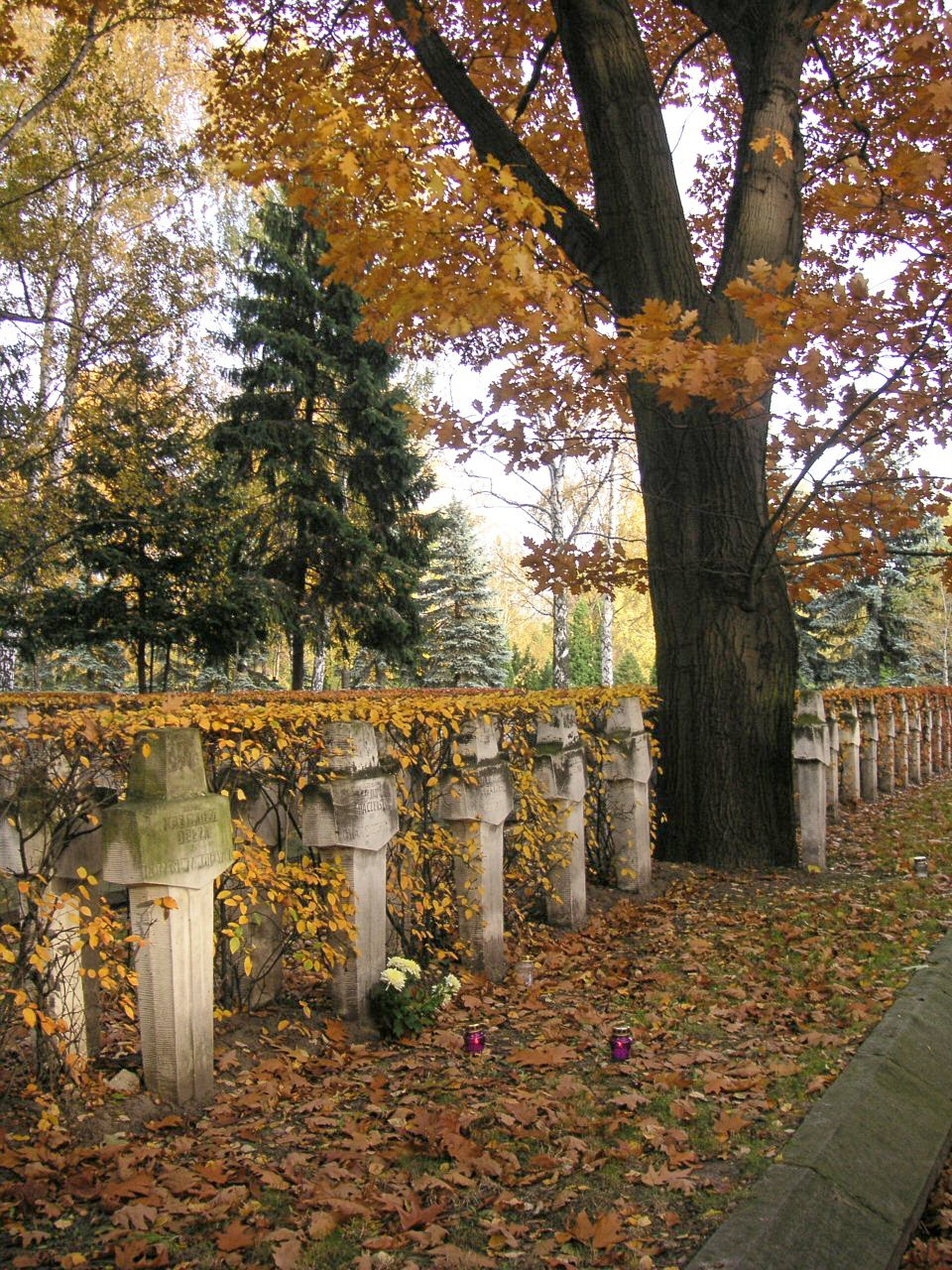
Graves of Polish soldiers who fell in the Polish Defensive War of 1939

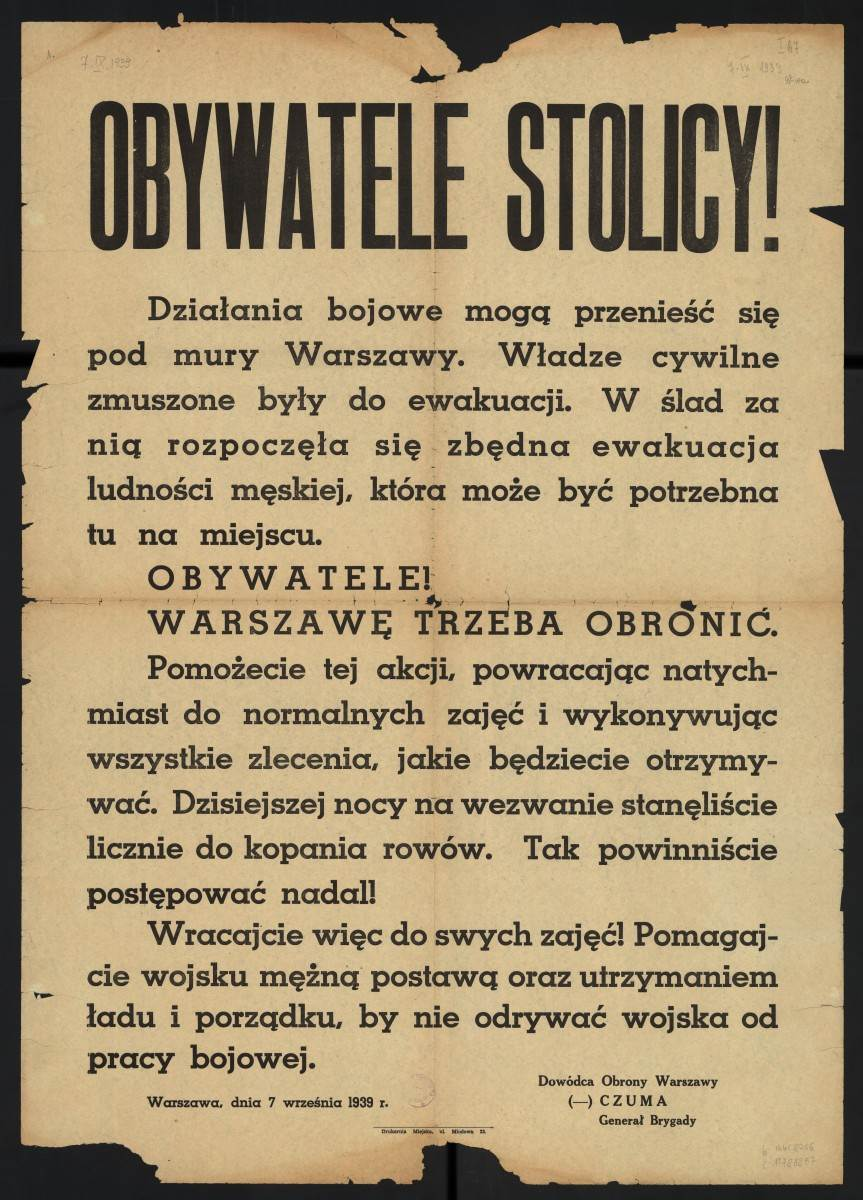
General Walerian Czuma's appeal to the inhabitants of Warsaw. The text reads – "Citizens! Warsaw must be defended!"

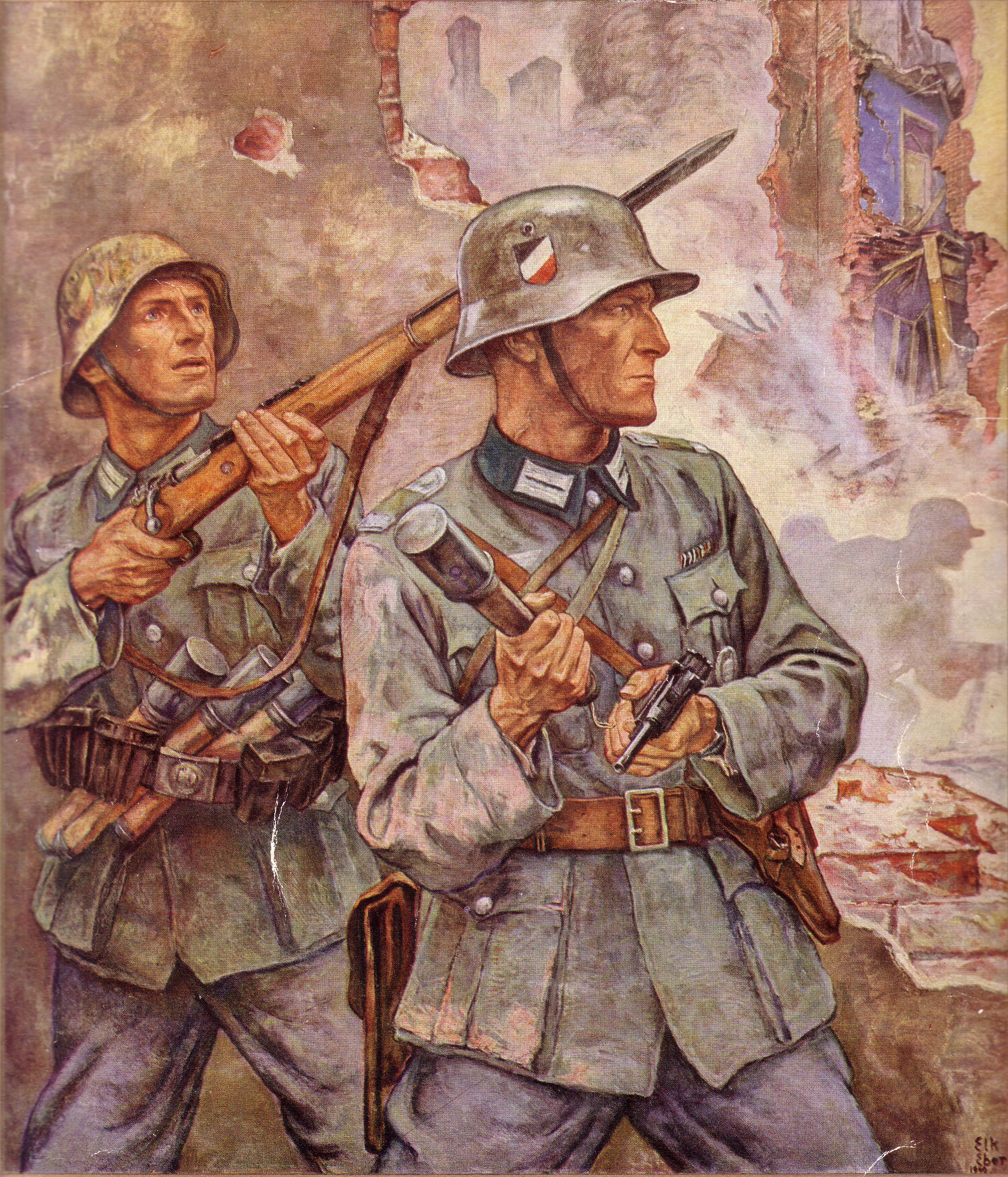
Kampf in Warschau-Vorstadt, German 1940 painting

== See also ==
- Bombing of Warsaw in World War II
- Festung Warschau
- History of Warsaw
- Warsaw Uprising
- List of World War II military equipment of Poland
- List of German military equipment of World War II
