= Festung Warschau =

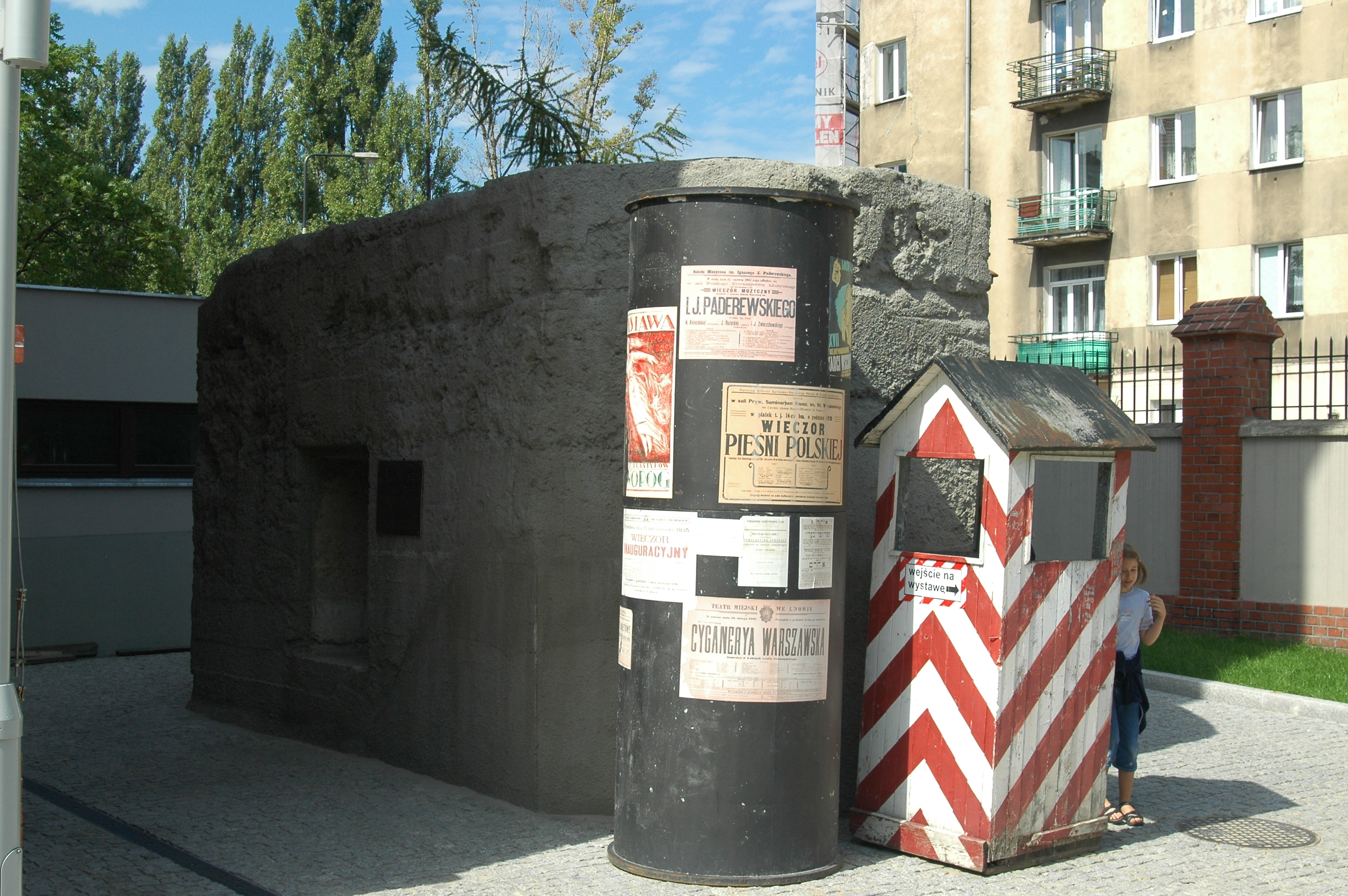
A preserved Tobruk-type pillbox in Warsaw. It is one of 12 pillboxes built as part of the 1945 Festung.

In the German language, Festung Warschau ("Fortress Warsaw") is the term used to refer to a fortified and well-defended Warsaw. In the 20th century, the term was in use on three occasions during World War I and World War II. It was used when the Germans threw back the Russian advance in 1914, where Warsaw came within distance of the fighting in October. The term resurfaced during the September 1939 German invasion of Poland. Later in the second war, the term resurfaced between July 1944 and January 1945, when the retreating Germans tried to establish a defense in the city against the advancing Soviet Union.

== 1939 ==
During the invasion of Poland in 1939 the German troops reached the outskirts of Warsaw on 9 September. The Oberkommando des Heeres (OKH) assumed that the unfortified city damaged by countless terror bombing raids would be taken by German motorized units without any resistance and issued a press and radio release stating that the capital of Poland was taken. However, the German motorized assault was defeated and the advancing troops were forced to retreat with heavy casualties. From 8 September the city started to be referred to as Fortress of Warsaw in German broadcasts, which was to justify the aerial bombardment of civilian targets.

The forces of the defenders, composed initially of only several battalions and various units of second-line troops, were soon strengthened by the soldiers of the Armies Poznań and Pomorze that reached the city in the aftermath of the Battle of Bzura. The Germans laid a siege to the city and started shelling it with heavy artillery located in the outskirts. However, the defending troops managed to defeat all assaults and until the end of September the Germans could not manage to break into the city.

After three weeks of constant aerial and artillery bombardment and assaults, the situation of the civilian inhabitants of Warsaw became dire. Food, water and medicine shortages as well as the Luftwaffe strafing inhabitants and refugees grouped within the city caused Warsaw's civilian authorities to request a cease-fire. Warsaw President Stefan Starzyński and Gen. Walerian Czuma, commander of the Warsaw garrison, decided that further resistance, although possible, would only expose the civilians to unnecessary hardship and signed the capitulation on 28 September 1939. The German text of the capitulation treaty as well as German propaganda used the term Festung Warschau to suggest that the failures of the Wehrmacht were due to heavily fortified terrain they had to cross. Warsaw, as a former Russian fortress, had several older fortifications, e.g. a ring of forts around the city and a citadel, built between 1835 and 1905.

== 1944 ==
By 1944, the German Eastern Front's situation became hopeless. Adolf Hitler who took over personally many duties in the OKW and OKH ordered the no step back policy in an attempt to halt the Soviet offensives which could not be contained by open field battle anymore. Following this policy, several cities were declared Festungen (Fortresses) and were to be held by the German army at all costs, even if surrounded and with no hope to break the siege. Examples of this policy were the Festung Stalingrad and Festung Kiev.

Later in the war, the "Festung" concept that was to be illustrated by the propaganda film Kolberg which reminds of Kolberg's defense against Napoleon in 1807, was also applied to German cities like Königsberg, Breslau, Frankfurt (Oder) and Berlin. Often even the civil population was supposed to support the rather suicidal attempts of defense, as the cities were largely destroyed in the course of the fights.

On 27 July 1944, Adolf Hitler ordered the Festung Warschau to be created and defended at all cost. The same day the governor of the General Government, Hans Frank, called for 100,000 Polish men between the ages of 17–65 to arrive at several gathering places in Warsaw the following day. They were to be employed at construction of fortifications for the Wehrmacht in and around the city. This move was viewed by the Armia Krajowa as an attempt to neutralize the underground forces, and the underground urged Warsaw inhabitants to ignore it. Fearing that the city would be turned into ruins and share the fate of Stalingrad and Kiev, General Tadeusz Bór-Komorowski ordered Operation Tempest to be started in Warsaw, which resulted in the Warsaw Uprising that lasted from August through September.

After the Uprising, during which the Soviets troops had arrived near the Vistula, the Germans razed the city to the ground and continued the construction of concrete bunkers that were to defend Festung Warschau against the Red Army for four months. However, when the Soviets finally crossed the Vistula on 17 January 1945, the city was captured in several hours with little resistance from the remaining German garrison. The Chief of the Operational Branch of the German Army General Staff (Generalstab des Heeres), Colonel Bogislaw von Bonin, gave permission for the retreat of German Heeresgruppe A from Warsaw on 16 January 1945, throughout the Soviet Vistula-Oder Offensive and was imprisoned on 19 January 1945 by the Gestapo at Flossenbürg concentration camp and Dachau concentration camp as he rejected a direct command of Adolf Hitler by this action.

== Notes and references ==
In-line:

General:

1. K. Sobczak (1966). ""Festung Warschau" według koncepcji dowództwa niemieckiego jesienią 1944 (>>Festung Warschau<< according to plans of the German high command in the autumn of 1944)". Studia i Materiały do Historii Wojskowości. 12 (1). ISSN 0562-2786.
1. J. Olecki "Wojenne tajemnice Warszawy i Mazowsza" część 1 rok 2007 Wydawnictwo CB
2. J. Olecki "Wojenne tajemnice Warszawy i Mazowsza" część 2 rok 2011 Wydawnictwo CB

== See also ==
- Warsaw Uprising
- World War II
