= Vistulan Boulevards, Warsaw =

Vistulan Boulevards in Warsaw
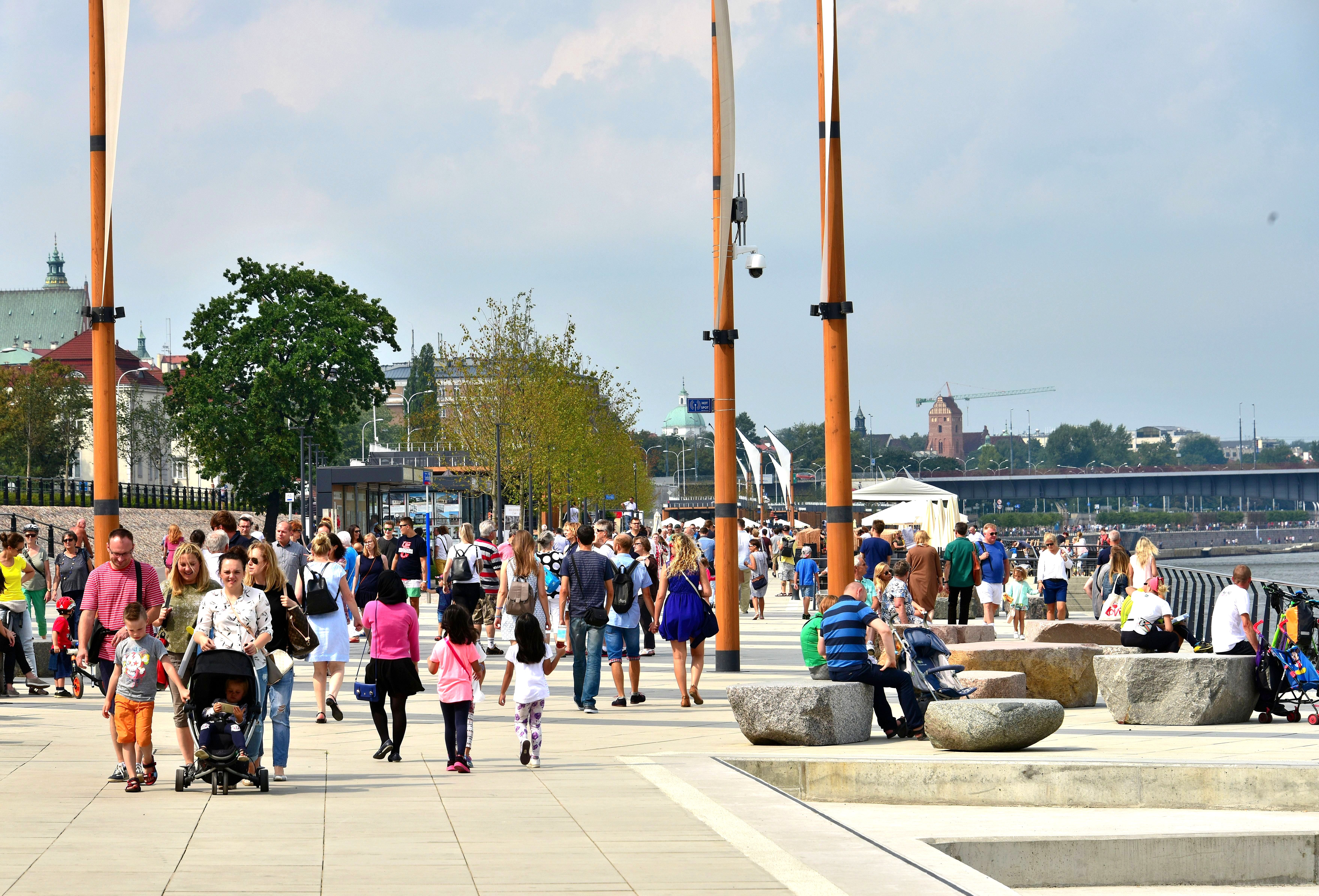
- Boulevards near Śląsko-Dąbrowski Bridge
- Interactive map of Vistulan Boulevards in Warsaw
- Type: Boulevards
- Location: Warsaw, Poland
- Coordinates: 52°08′27″N 21°01′21″E
- Created: 2015
- Status: Open year round

Vistula boulevards (Polish: Bulwary wiślane) form a continuous riverside promenade on the left (west) bank of the River Vistula in Warsaw, Poland. The section between Poniatowski Bridge and Śląsko-Dąbrowski Bridge is named after Bohdan Grzymała-Siedlecki, and between the bridges of Śląsko-Dąbrowski and Gdański after Jan Karski.

The reconstruction of the boulevards began in 2013. The opening of the boulevards was planned for the July, and then autumn of 2014. Later dates of the opening of the boulevards at Podzamcze was estimated to be April 2015, and the segment to Copernicus Science Centre in mid-2015.

The first segment of the Vistulan Boulevards was opened on August 2, 2015.

== Gallery ==
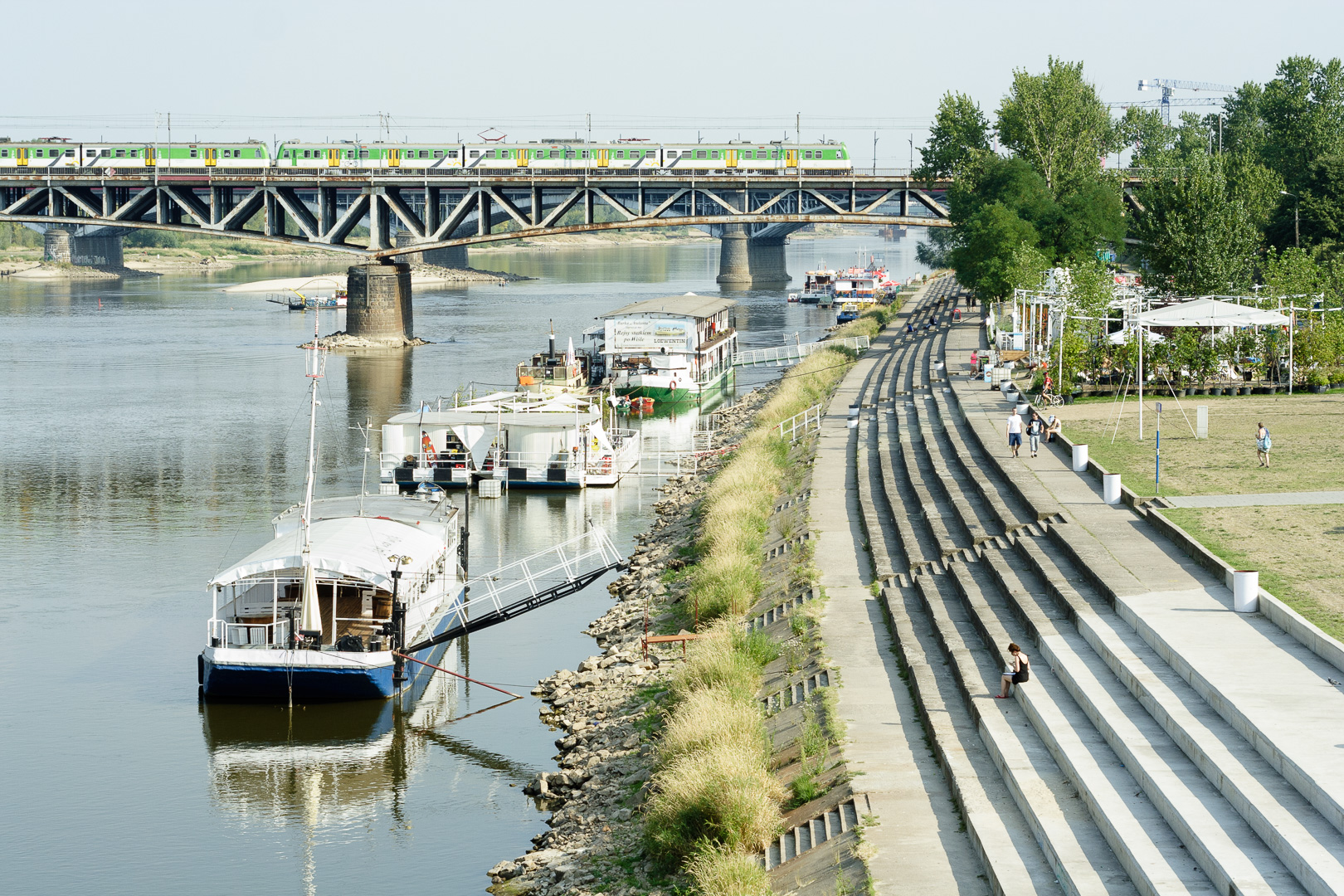
Vistulan Boulevards in Powiśle, in the foreground is the Świętokrzyski Bridge.

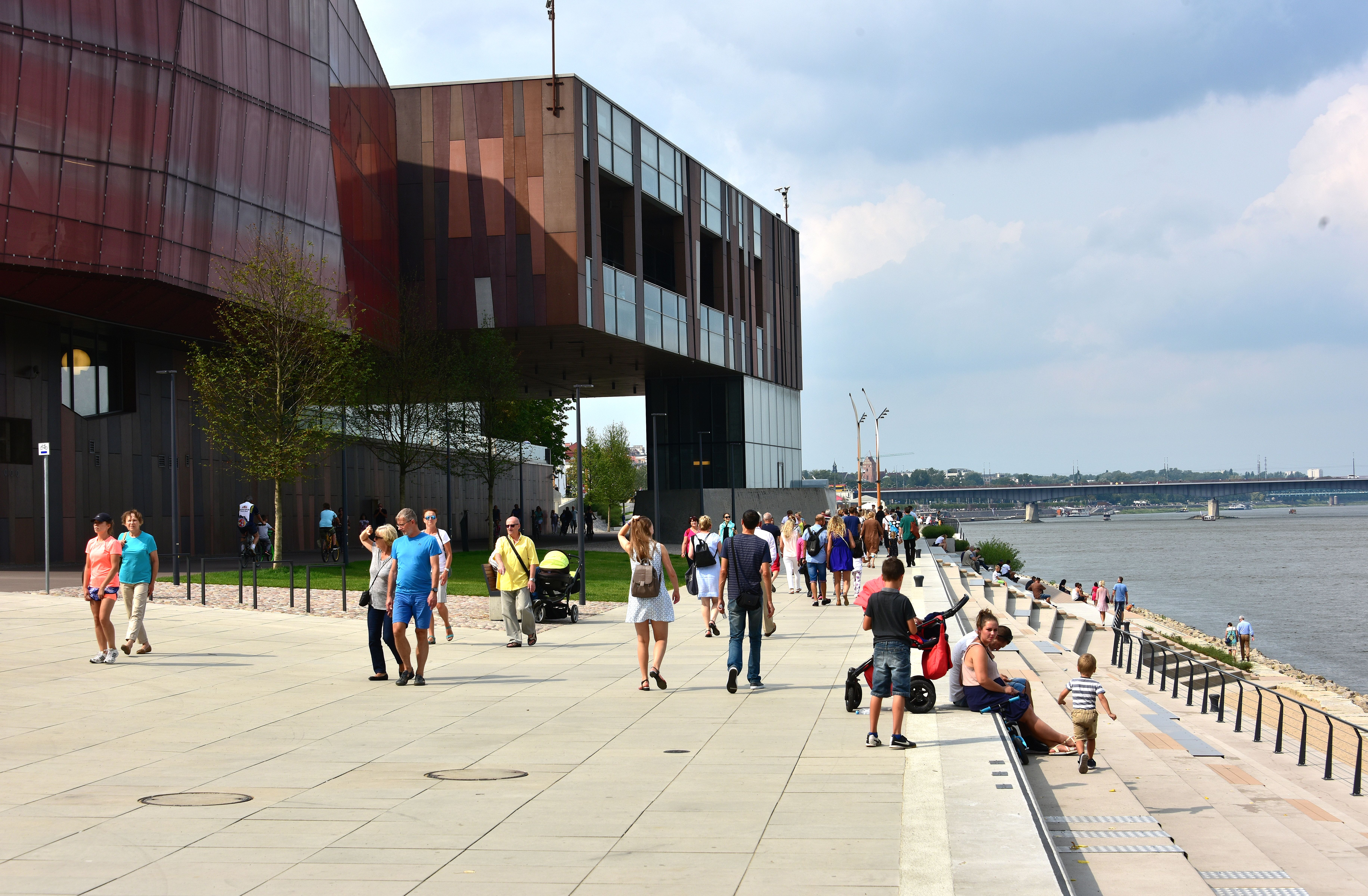
The Boulverads near Copernicus Science Centre

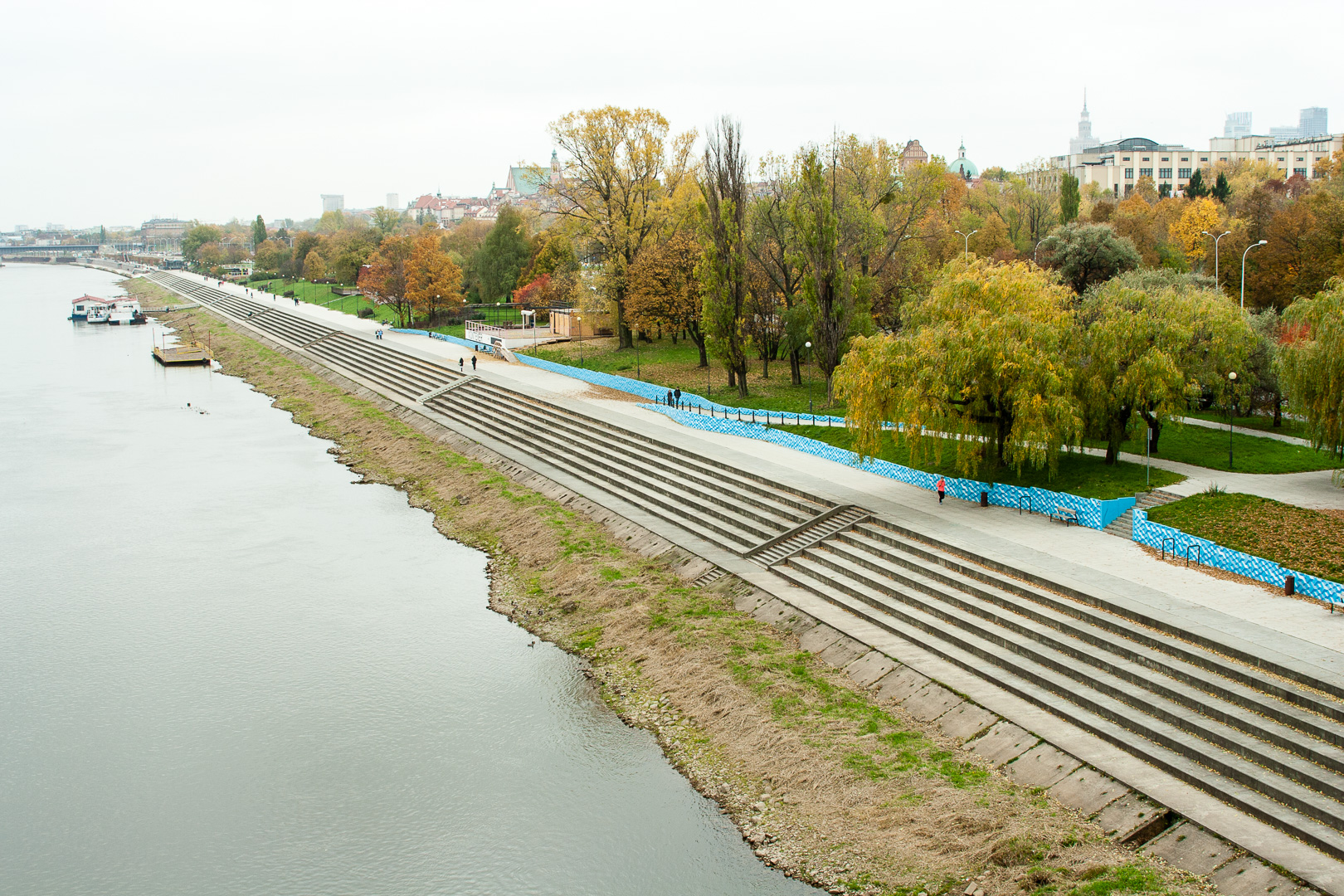
Vistulan Boulevards in Nowe Miasto and Old Town, in the foreground is the Gdański Bridge.
