= Julian Kulski =

Polish resistance fighter

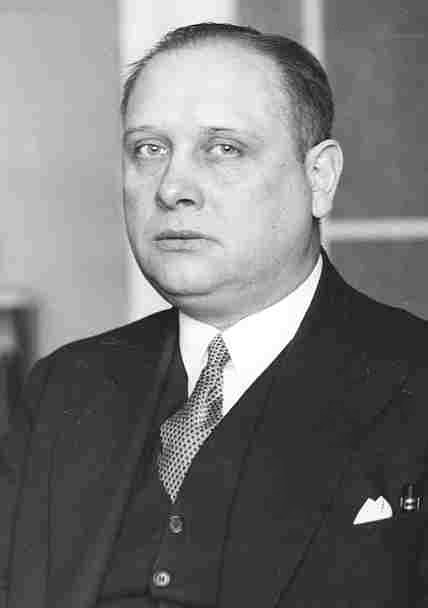
Julian Kulski in 1935

Julian Kulski (5 December 1892 in Warsaw – 18 August 1976 in Warsaw) was a Polish civil servant, best known for being Mayor of Warsaw during World War II.

During the pre-war period he was a Vice President of Warsaw (1935–1939) under Stefan Starzyński, with whom he actively led a defense of the city during the Invasion of Poland. He was named by German occupation authorities the President after Starzyński was arrested. Kulski accepted this post on the advice of the resistance movement and the Polish Government in Exile and during his tenure actively worked with them against the occupation forces, always remaining loyal to Poland.

In 2025, research by historian Grzegorz Rossoliński-Liebe revealed that Kulski had assisted the German occupiers in registering Jews, controlling their bank accounts, dismissing Jewish employees, introducing antisemitic legislation, registering Jewish forced laborers, establishing a ghetto, levy taxes in the ghetto, and rent Jewish houses, shops, and factories to Germans and Poles. Under the influence of Polish and German businessmen and factory owners, he also pushed to reduce the size of the ghetto, which is why more than 30 percent of the city's population lived in a tiny area covering 2.4 percent of the city's total area.

Before he became a part of the Warsaw municipal government, he served in the Polish Legions in World War I (1914–1917) and the Polish Army (1919–1921). He was also a commander of the People's Militia in Warsaw (1918–1919) and a longtime high-ranking employee of the Ministry of Treasury.

Because of his accomplishment during the war, Kulski remained widely recognized.

His son, Julian Eugeniusz Kulski (1929–2021), was a member of the Polish underground during the war from ages 12 to 15. He published a book and a video about his experiences called Legacy of the White Eagle in 2006. He moved to the US and became a prominent architect.
