= Family of Angela Merkel =

Family of the chancellor of Germany

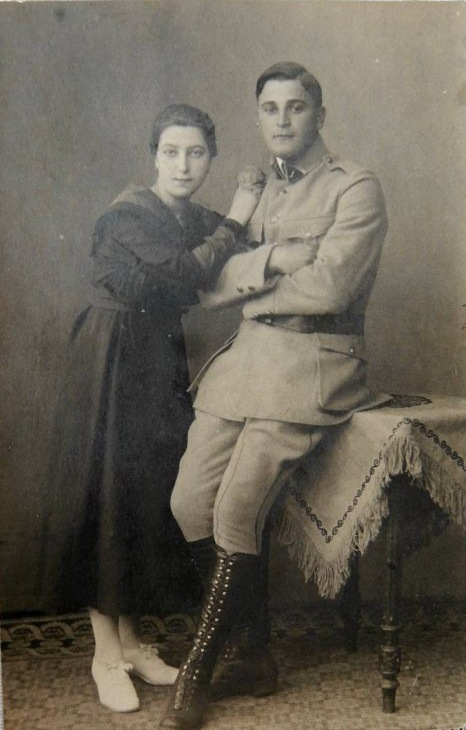
- Merkel's paternal grandparents, Ludwik Marian Kaźmierczak and Margarethe
- Current region: Germany; Poland
- Members: Angela Merkel, Horst Kasner, Ludwig Kasner
- Connected members: Herlind Kasner, Willi Jentzsch, Marcus Kasner
- Connected families: Kasner
- Traditions: Lutheranism

The family of Angela Merkel, the former chancellor of Germany, is of German and Polish descent. Merkel was born Angela Dorothea Kasner on 17 July 1954 in Hamburg. The Kasner name is derived from Jan Kaźmierczak, a Pole from Poznań who lived in the 18th century. Merkel's grandfather changed the name to Kasner in 1930. Merkel has been married twice, and kept the name of her first husband, Ulrich Merkel. Angela Merkel's family was extensively discussed in a 2013 biography.

== Paternal relations ==
=== Horst Kasner ===
Horst Kasner (né Horst Kaźmierczak; born 6 August 1926 in Berlin, died 2 September 2011 in Templin) was the father of Angela Merkel, and was a Protestant theologian.

=== Ludwig Kasner ===
Ludwig Kasner (né Ludwik Marian Kaźmierczak; born 1896 in Posen, Germany (now Poznań, Poland), died 1959 in Berlin) was the paternal grandfather of Angela Merkel. He served as a soldier in the Polish Blue Army which took part in Poland's struggle for independence. In the aftermath of the First World War he moved to Berlin, the hometown of his fiancée Margarethe, and worked for the Berlin Police.

== Maternal relations ==
=== Herlind Jentzsch ===
Herlind Kasner (née Jentzsch; born on 8 July 1928 in the Free City of Danzig, died 6 April 2019 in Templin) was the mother of Angela Merkel and a teacher of English and Latin. She continued to teach English at an adult education center in Templin into her 80s.

=== Willi Jentzsch ===
Willi Jentzsch (born 15 May 1886 in Wolfen, died 23 May 1936 in the Free City of Danzig) was the maternal grandfather of Angela Merkel. He was a teacher, school administrator and politician in the Free City of Danzig, and was elected as one of the eleven Senators of the Free City of Danzig on 27 October 1926, but resigned on 1 November 1927 to become rector of the renowned Gymnasium St. Johann in Fleischergasse. In March 1936, he became school director in Danzig, and thus head of all elementary schools in the city-state.

== Ancestry ==
Ancestors of Family of Angela Merkel

16. (Possibly) Józef Wojciechowski
8. (Possibly) Ludwik Wojciechowski
15. (Possibly) Franziska
4. Ludwig Kasner (born “Ludwik Kaźmierczak”)
18. Bartłomiej Kaźmierczak
9. Anna Kaźmierczak
19. Apolonia Bielejewicz
2. Horst Kasner (né Kaźmierczak)
20. Karl Poerschke
10. Karl August Pörschke
21. Christina Stanowski
5. Margarethe Pörschke
11. Maria Wilhelmine Thimm
1. Angela Merkel (née Kasner), Chancellor of Germany
24. Johann Christoph Jentzsch
12. Friedrich Wilhelm Jentzsch
25. Anna Marie Hanke
6. Willi Jentzsch, Senator in the Free City of Danzig
26. Friedrich Carl Wilde
13. Wilhelmine Pauline Minna Wilde
27. Caroline Wilhelmine Ehrenberg
3. Herlind Jentzsch
28. Carl Gottfried Drange
14. Emil Drange, City Clerk of Elbing
29. Emilie Juliane Günther
7. Gertrud Alma Drange
30. Christoph Wachs
15. Emma Pauline Wilhelmine Wachs

== Siblings ==
=== Marcus Kasner ===
Marcus Kasner (born 7 July 1957) is the only brother of Angela Merkel and is a theoretical physicist.

His early career paralleled that of his sister Angela; like her he studied physics, earned a doctoral degree in physics (Dr.rer.nat.) and worked as a researcher at the German Academy of Sciences at Berlin. He earned his Habilitation with the dissertation Electronic correlation in the quantum Hall regime at the Otto von Guericke University Magdeburg in 2002. He has published papers in journals such as Physical Review Letters, Physical Review and Physica. Kasner currently teaches at the Institute for Theoretical Physics at the Goethe University Frankfurt and lives in Darmstadt.

During the Fall of Communism, Marcus Kasner was involved in the opposition movement in East Germany in the same small circle as his sister as she started her political career. He was a friend of Günter Nooke, the founder of Democratic Awakening, and took part in political discussions on the future of the state. After the German reunification, he was a member of Alliance 90/The Greens.

=== Irene Kasner ===
Irene Kasner (born 19 August 1964) is the only sister of Angela Merkel and is an occupational therapist.

== Spouses ==
=== Ulrich Merkel ===
Ulrich Merkel (born in 1953) was the first husband of Angela Merkel. He met Angela Kasner in 1974 when they were both physics students, and they married in 1977. The marriage ended in divorce in 1982. Angela Merkel kept her first husband's last name.

=== Joachim Sauer ===
Joachim Sauer (born 19 April 1949) is the second husband of Angela Merkel. He is a quantum chemist and full professor at the Humboldt University of Berlin. He married Angela Merkel on 30 December 1998.
