= Battle of Borkowo =

- Part of Polish–Soviet War
Date	14–15 August 1920
Location	Borkowo
Result	Polish victory: Poles achieve strategical advantage

Belligerents
Poland	Russian SFSR

Commanders and leaders
Colonel Kazimierz Rumsza	General August Kork

Units involved
Polish Army's Siberian Brigade	Red Army's 11th and 16th Rifle Divisions

Casualties and losses
500	

The Battle of Borkowo took place on 14–15 August 1920, during the Polish–Soviet War. Polish Army's Siberian Brigade, commanded by Colonel Kazimierz Rumsza, clashed with Red Army's 11th and 16th Rifle Divisions (part of 5th Army under General August Kork). Polish Siberian Brigade was supported by subunits of 9th and 18th Infantry Divisions. The battle took place near the village of Borkowo, where Poles defended the Wkra river crossings.

Following the order of General Józef Haller, who commanded Polish Northern Front, 5th Army (General Władysław Sikorski) began on 14 August 1920 an attack on Soviet 15th Army, which concentrated along the Wkra river.

On 13 August the Siberian Brigade of Colonel Rumsza concentrated in the area of Borkowo and Popielżyn-Zawady, and on the same day, after a 14-hour march from Zegrze, 1st Siberian Infantry Regiment (Major Franciszek Dindorf-Ankowicz) also arrived at Borkowo, tasked with defence of the Wkra crossings. Behind the infantry, Polish artillery took positions, and before midnight, 2nd Siberian Infantry Regiment reinforced Polish defences.

The Siberian Brigade was a fresh unit, formed out of remains of 5th Division (Colonel Walerian Czuma), soldiers of the former Blue Army, and volunteers, including a number of boyscouts and high school students (among the volunteers were two classes from a boys' high school in Łódź, who had only two weeks of training). The brigade was regarded as a weak unit, in which officers hardly knew their soldiers. It faced Soviet 11th and 16th Rifle Divisions of the 5th Army. Polish headquarters was not aware of crushing Soviet superiority in the area of Borkowo.

On 14 August Captain Jozef Werobej decided to push the Soviets out of Popielzyn-Zawady, in order to secure the Wkra crossings and open the way towards Nowe Miasto. Werobej ordered 3rd Battalion, which consisted of veterans of the Blue Army, to attack the Soviets. At app. 1 p.m. Poles crossed the Wkra, surprising Soviet 16th Rifles. Soon other Polish companies crossed the river, but the plan was abandoned because of the situation near Cieksyn, where Polish defensive lines were destroyed by the enemy. Cieksyn was lost, and Polish forces in the area, after losing almost all of the officers, retreated to the western bank of the Wkra.

After a short artillery barrage, the Soviets crossed the Wkra, and pushed the Poles out of Borkowo. Further Soviet advance in this sector threatened whole Polish frontline, but meanwhile Poles were reinforced by 35th and 41st Infantry Regiments of 9th Infantry Divisions. Both took positions north of the village, and managed to stop Soviet advance with machine gun fire.

On the night of 14-15 August Polish forces in the area were ordered by General Sikorski to continue their advance, regardless of the losses. Colonel Rumsza decided to attack Nowe Miasto, and on 15 August, at 1 pm, Polish assault began. During the fighting, some Polish companies lost 50% of their manpower, but after hand-to-hand fighting, the Soviets were forced to retreat, and Polish regiments took positions on the eastern bank of the Wkra.

The Battle of Borkowo lasted two days, during which Polish Army lost some 500 men. Nevertheless, the Poles managed to halt Soviet advance, and push its forces back behind the Wkra. With positions on the eastern bank of the river, Polish Army achieved strategic advantage for its future attacks towards Nasielsk and Pułtusk.

The Battle of Borkowo is commemorated on the Tomb of the Unknown Soldier, Warsaw, with the inscription "BORKOWO pod NASIELSKIEM 14 – 15 VIII 1920".

== Sources ==
- Bohdan Skaradziński, Sąd boży 1920, wyd. Świat Książki, Warszawa 1996.
- J. Odziemkowski, Leksykon wojny polsko-rosyjskiej 1919 – 1920, wyd. RYTM Warszawa 2004.
