= 5th Rifle Division (Poland) =

Polish military unit

This unit should not be confused with the 5th Rifle Division (II Polish Corps in Russia).

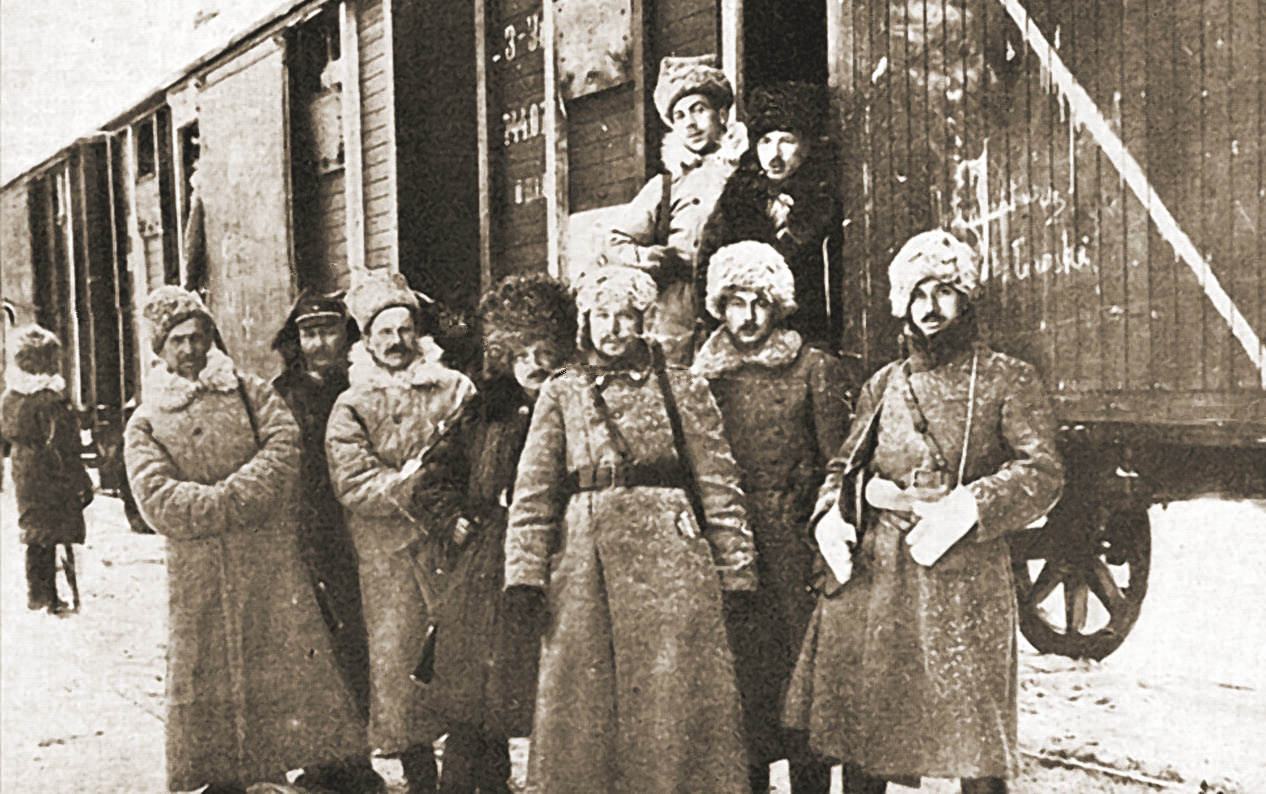
Soldiers of 5th Polish Rifle Division in transport through Siberia, winter 1919/1920

Polish 5th Siberian Rifle Division (Polish: 5. Dywizja Strzelców Polskich, Russian: Польская 5-я Стрелковая Дивизия; also known as the Siberian Division [Dywizja Syberyjska, Сибирский Дивизион] and Siberian Brigade [Brygada Syberyjska, Сибирский Бригада]) was a Polish military unit formed in 1919 in Russia during the aftermath of World War I. The division fought during the Polish-Soviet War, but as it was attached to the White Russian formations, it is considered to have fought more in the Russian Civil War. Its tradition was continued in the Polish Army as the 30th Infantry Division.

== History ==
=== Early days ===
During World War I Russia entered a period of rapid decline. Internal problems led to an outbreak of the Russian Revolution of 1917. Initially the revolutionists promised new world order and putting a bloody war to an end. However, their rule provoked many protests and uprisings led by a variety of generals and political parties, from monarchists through anarchists to republicans.

In the turmoil of the Russian Civil War many nations started to form their own military units. Among them was a large number of Czechs and Slovaks that defected on the Russian front or were taken POW and formed the Czechoslovak Legion. The unit started an armed rebellion in Siberia and managed to effectively liberate much of the area from the Reds. At the same time Poles present in Russia also started to form their own units. In accordance with treaties with France signed the year before, the units formed in Russia were to be a part of the Allied Polish Army.

The action of forming a new unit was started on July 1, 1918, by major Walerian Czuma, a veteran from the 2nd brigade of the Polish Legions who was taken POW during World War I. Soon a new division was formed. The unit was composed of three infantry regiments, supported by an assault battalion, Uhlans regiment, artillery regiment, battalion of engineers, tabors and medical corps. The volunteers came from a variety of places: the core of the new unit was formed of POWs of the former Austro-Hungarian Army and local Poles. Some of the latter were descendants of Poles forcibly resettled to Siberia after failed November Uprising, January Uprising and other struggles with Imperial Russia.

Since the division was formally a part of the Blue Army (Polish Army in France), it was named the 5th Polish Rifle Division. The other Polish divisions at that time were 1st, 2nd and 3rd fighting with the Blue Army formed by general Józef Haller de Hallenburg in France and the Polish 4th Rifle Division of general Lucjan Żeligowski fighting in Kuban River region in southern Russia.

=== Civil War in Russia ===
The newly formed division joined the ranks of the White Guard of admiral Alexander Kolchak. Together with the White Russians, and elements of the Czechoslovak Legion, the unit defended Siberia against the Red Army. In defence of the Trans-Siberian Railway that was vital to counter-revolutionist supply, the division fought numerous battles against the Red forces. The unit of Major Walerian Czuma also had to fight with the harsh winter and logistic problems. Matériel and food transports were scarce, but the Poles made up lack of supplies with ingenuity, constructing three armoured trains. Also, several vessels were turned into patrol boats and artillery monitors to defend the Ob River crossings. These were the first ships flying the banner of the Polish Navy since 1863 and the first Polish warships since 1792.

The division was first formed in Samara. After the Czechs and Slovaks had taken Ufa, the headquarters was moved there. Finally, the division finished its training in Buguruslan. Since the volunteers for the division were mostly uneducated (Polish language and Polish history were banned from schools in all Russian Empire), Major Czuma ordered organisation of public schools, libraries and theatres for the recruits. There were also Scouting groups organised for the children of the local Polish diaspora. On August 15, 1918, the first regiment was named after Tadeusz Kościuszko and the following day was moved to the front. The other regiments joined soon afterwards.

The offensive of Admiral Kolchak ended with a failure in the summer of 1919. When the Red Army seized Petropavlovsk at the beginning of November 1919, the front was broken open and the Siberian Army began to disintegrate. Kolchak's government hastily ordered the evacuation of Omsk 6 November 1919, but this quickly turned into a disorderly rout along the Trans-Siberian Railway. The Entente had determined the order of the withdrawal, with the echelons of the Allied Forces first—Czechs, Serbs Romanians and Poles, and then the masses of Russian refugees and remaining White Armies. However the trains soon crawled to a halt in icy conditions of a terrible Siberian winter and began to break down.

As the forces of the Red Army approached the log jam of trains backed up before Novo-Nikolaevsk (Novosibirsk) in early December, the Poles had to put down a local revolt by White troops. Soon after this the last Polish forces left the area and joined the withdrawal. At Taiga 22 December 1919 the Polish Legion made a stand against the Red Army but were badly beaten losing many of their trains. After this defeat the Polish Legion began to disintegrate. Many of their trains began to break down, and the Poles were forced to abandon them and join the exodus that streamed along the frozen tracks beside the railway. Fights broke out between the Poles, Romanians and Serbs for any engines that still worked. As the remaining trains limped towards Krasnoyarsk, the town was occupied by the Siberian Partisans of Shchetinkin 4 January 1920, even though the Poles still controlled the station. The leading echelons got away but ran out of fuel and supplies at Klyukvennaya (now Uyar) east of Krasnoyarsk. The Czechs were better equipped and strong enough to later fight their way through Kansk to Irkutsk, where in conference with the Allies and the new Soviet they were allowed to withdraw without further destruction of the railway (17 February 1920). However the Polish Legion had no choice but to negotiate with the Red Army and asked to be allowed to return to Poland through Russia, but the Bolsheviks demanded that they surrender. Some then mutinied and went over to the Red Army, others who had wives and children surrendered: formal surrender of the remaining 5000 strong force was agreed 8 January 1920, and all the trains that had left Krasnoyarsk were captured by the Reds. The Poles were interned at the Viona Gorodock P.O.W camp at Krasnoyarsk, where many subsequently died in the typhus epidemic that was devastating Siberia at that time. The Soviet authorities put them to work clearing the railway yards of refuse. Others were marched off to perish in forced labour in the mines. Those that survived were later repatriated under the terms of the Treaty of Riga in March 1921.

=== Evacuation ===
A large part of the once 16,000 men strong division were taken as POWs. However a group of about 900 led by Colonel Kazimierz Rumsza managed to evade capture and reached Irkutsk and from there escaped to Manchuria arriving at Harbin (February 21, 1920) and Irkutsk, from where they found safe passage to the port of Vladivostok and various ports of China and Manchuria. On June 1, 1920, the first organised group of Polish soldiers arrived to the port of Gdańsk. After three months on-board British ships, 120 officers and more than 800 soldiers and NCOs reached Poland. Some of them saw it for the first time.

=== Polish-Bolshevik War ===
The General Staff of the Polish Army initially wanted to demobilise all the veterans. However, all of them volunteered and were finally accepted. They were transferred to Greater Poland, where they were formed into an infantry battalion and an "Officers Legion". Soon they were joined by approximately 5 000 volunteers from Kalisz, Kutno, Łódź, Włocławek and other towns of Western Poland and the "Officers Legion" became a core of the reformed Siberian Brigade (Polish: Brygada Syberyjska) formed on July 12, 1920.

The new unit was composed of two regiments: the 1st Siberian Infantry Regiment under Franciszek Dindorf-Ankowicz and the 2nd Siberian Infantry Regiment under Józef Werobej. The brigade was put under command of one of the Siberian veterans, colonel Kazimierz Rumsza.

Although the training of the new recruits was not finished, the extremely difficult situation on all fronts of the Polish-Bolshevik War forced the General Staff to transfer it to the front. The brigade was transferred to the area of the Modlin Fortress and on August 13 joined the 5th Army under general Władysław Sikorski. The Siberian Brigade became a core of the Polish defence lines in the area and managed to hold out all assaults on the fortress organised by the Red Army. After the Battle of Warsaw the brigade started a pursuit after the fleeing enemy forces and broke through the enemy front in the battles of Borków, Zawady and Joniec. Between August 22 and August 24, 1920, the brigade fought heavy battles against the Red 4th Army and 3rd Cavalry Corps under Gay Dimitrievich Gay. Its elements took part in the later Battle of the Niemen and several skirmishes with Lithuanian forces occupying the region of Suwałki.

=== Interbellum ===
After the Peace of Riga had been signed the 2nd regiment was demobilised, while the 1st regiment remained in the Polish Army. On August 22, 1921, it was renamed to 82nd Siberian Infantry Regiment (Polish: 82 Syberyjski pułk piechoty). It was stationed in Brześć Litewski. In 1937 the name of Tadeusz Kościuszko, the original patron of the regiment, was added to the name of the unit.

=== World War II ===
Before the outbreak of World War II the 82nd regiment was attached to the Polish 30th Infantry Division commanded by Brigadier General Leopold Cehak. It was secretly mobilized between March 23 and March 27, 1939, and moved to the village of Szczerców where it formed a defensive line at the Widawka River. After the outbreak of the Polish Defensive War of 1939 it was attacked on September 2.

The regiment fought in the ranks of the "Piotrków Corps" of the Polish Łódź Army under general Juliusz Rómmel.

== See also ==
- Russian Civil War
- Polish-Bolshevik War
- Polish Defensive War of 1939
- List of Polish divisions in WWI
- Czech Legion
- Czesław Gawlikowski
- Bohaterowie Sybiru
