= Kazimierz Rumsza =

Polish general

Kazimierz Rumsza (20 August 1886 – 1970) was a Polish general.

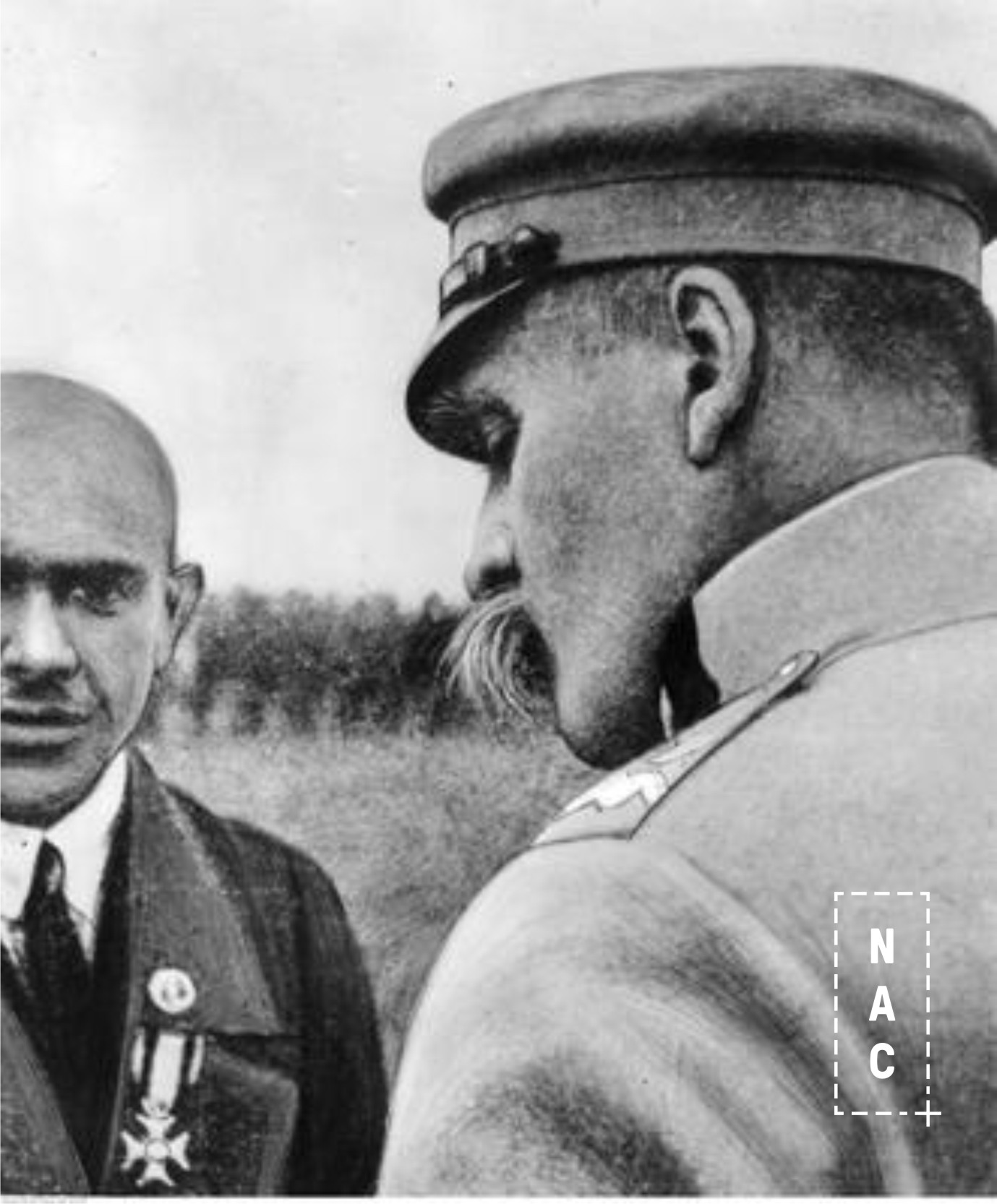
A portrait of Kazimierz Rumsza

== Biography ==
After military service in the Imperial Russian Army in World War I, where he reached the rank of a colonel, he joined the 1st Polish Corps of General Józef Dowbor-Muśnicki in western Russia from December 1917 until the Germans forced its dissolution in July 1918.

He helped Walerian Czuma organise 1st Kosciuszko regiment at Samara in August 1918 which later formed the 5th Rifle Division in Siberia (sometimes known as the Polish Legion or the Siberian Division) which fought alongside the Czech Legion and the White movement in the Russian Civil War. This division was formed on Russian territory in 1919 during World War I, but it was attached to White Russian formations and fought primarily in the Russian Civil War. The division's core was made up of former Austro-Hungarian Army POWs and local Poles, descendants of Poles who were forcibly resettled in Siberia following failed uprisings against Imperial Russia.

When the White government of Admiral Aleksandr Kolchak collapsed in December 1919, the Polish Legion joined the general retreat along the Trans-Siberian Railway, until it was surrounded by the Red Army east of Krasnoyarsk in early January 1920. The Polish Legion fought the Red Army in Taiga on December 22, 1919, but lost heavily. Refusing to surrender, Rumsza led 900 officers and men on an ice march through the taiga slipping through Bolshevik forces until they reached Irkutsk. From there they managed to escape to Harbin in White-controlled Manchuria, and thence to Vladivostok. Rumsza's force arrived at Gdańsk (Danzig) in Poland in June 1920 and volunteered to fight in the Polish-Soviet War which had just broken out.

The group of roughly 1,500 people, led by Rumsza, evaded capture and arrived in Harbin on February 21, 1920. Rumsza went on to command his reformed division and fought several battles with Red Cavalry. He was awarded the Virtuti Militari Cross for his services in Russia.

During World War II he joined the pro-Allies Polish Armed Forces in the West. He died in exile in London in 1970 and was buried on the eastern side of Highgate Cemetery.

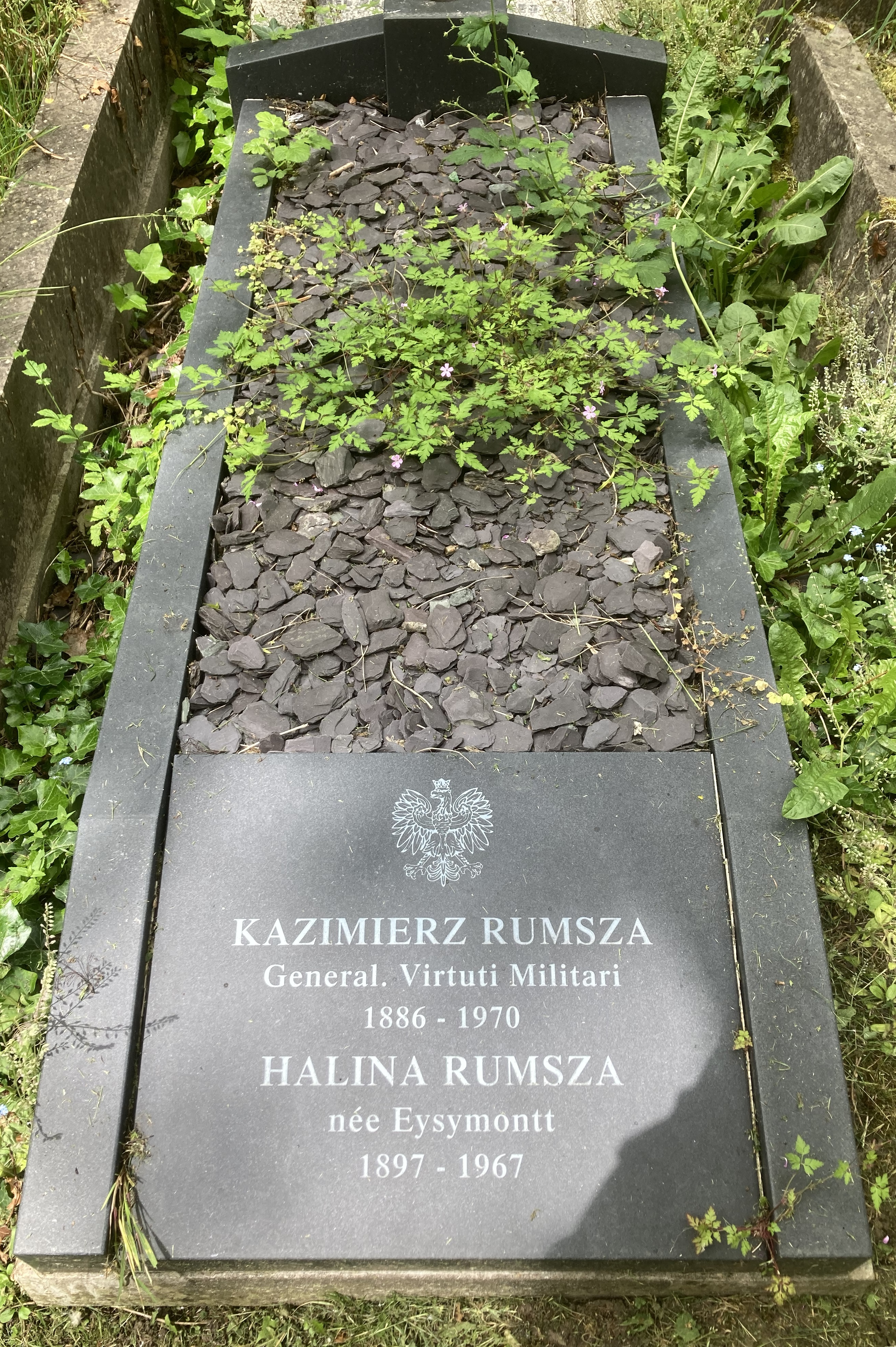
Grave of Kazimierz Rumsza in Highgate Cemetery

== Honours and awards ==
- Silver Cross of the Virtuti Militari
- Cross of Independence
- Officer's Cross of the Order of Polonia Restituta
- Cross of Valour (four times)
