= Horst Kasner =

German theologian and father of Angela Merkel

- Born: Horst Kaźmierczak; 6 August 1926; Pankow, Berlin, Germany
- Died: 2 September 2011 (aged 85); Templin, Brandenburg, Germany
- Burial place: Templin Forest Cemetery
- Spouse: Herlinde Jentzch (m. 1949)
- Children: 3, including Angela
- Relatives: Ludwig Kasner (father); Margarethe Pörschke (mother)
- Military career
- Allegiance: Nazi Germany; East Germany; Germany
- Branch: Wehrmacht
- Service years: 1943–1945
- Rank: Rottenführer (Hitlerjugend)
- Conflicts: World War II (POW)
- Other work: Pastor

Horst Kasner (né Kaźmierczak; 6 August 1926 – 2 September 2011) was a German Protestant theologian and father of former German Chancellor Angela Merkel.

== Biography ==
Kasner was born as Horst Kaźmierczak in 1926, the son of a policeman in the Pankow suburb of Berlin, where he was brought up. His father Ludwig Kaźmierczak (1896 in Posen, German Empire – 1959 in Berlin) was born out of wedlock to Anna Kazmierczak and Ludwik Wojciechowski, ethnic Poles and citizens of the German Empire from the Poznań area. Ludwig was mobilised into the German army in 1915 and sent to France, where he was taken prisoner of war and joined the Polish Haller's Army fighting on the side of the Entente. Together with the army he returned to Poland to fight in the Polish-Ukrainian war and the Polish-Soviet war. After Posen had become part of Poland, Ludwig moved with his wife in 1923 to Berlin, where he served as a policeman, and changed his family name to Kasner in 1930.

While Kasner served in the military during World War II, little is known about Horst Kasner's wartime service; he was held as a prisoner of war at the age of 19. During his high school years he was a member of the Hitler Youth, with the last service position of a troop leader. From 1948 he studied theology, first in Heidelberg then in Hamburg. It was in Hamburg that he got to know and later married Herlinde Jentzsch, an English and Latin teacher, born on 8 July 1928 in Danzig (now Gdańsk, Poland) the daughter of Danzig politician Willi Jentzsch.

== Migration to the German Democratic Republic ==
Several weeks after the birth of their daughter, the family moved from Hamburg to East Berlin. The interior border was not yet completely closed, but most German migration was in the opposite direction (see also: Berlin Wall). In the first five months of 1954, 180,000 people had fled the GDR, and during the building of the border defenses between 1949 and 1961 around Templin, Kasner moved to the East according to the wishes of Youth Pastor Hans-Otto Wölber, the later (1964–1983) Bishop of Hamburg, who feared a shortage of pastors in the East would work against the church. Kasner found a pastor's position with the Evangelical Church in Berlin-Brandenburg and the family moved to a rectory in the village of Quitzow near Perleberg. Pastors took various positions in their willingness to cooperate with the communist authorities.

== Pastor in Templin ==
Three years later in 1957, Kasner moved to the small Brandenburg town of Templin. There, at the request of Albrecht Schönherr, then General Superintendent for the Sprengel (ecclesiastical region) Eberswalde, he took a development position in the religious education office. Schönherr, in a 2004 interview, indicated he made the appointment "due to the good working conditions and Kasner's abilities as a pedagogue." The location of the continuing education buildings was the Waldhof, a complex of church buildings erected outside the center of Templin, which from 1958 on, also housed a facility for the mentally handicapped.

Their daughter Angela had been born on 17 July 1954. Marcus Kasner, who has grown up to become a physicist, was born on 7 July 1957 and a second daughter, Irene, on 19 August 1964.

Kasner was regarded as a religious leader and idealist who did not oppose the church governance or the policies of the Socialist party, unlike Schönherr and Hanfried Müller (members of the Weissensee Work Group (Weißenseer Arbeitskreis) standing in opposition to dominant national-conservative trend of Berlin-Brandenburg bishop Otto Dibelius). From a perspective of governance, Kasner was considered one of the more "progressive" forces. His nickname during GDR times, quoted repeatedly in the press, was "Red Kasner." He was the longtime director of the pastoral college in a key position within the Evangelical Church in Berlin-Brandenburg. All theologians were required as part of their education and training to spend some time as a vicar with their second theological examination in Templin. In this context there is little record of any pressure put on pastors to conform to the system. Theologian Richard Schröder wrote in 2004:

For me, Kasner was always trustworthy and certainly no conformist. The Pastor's College in Templin was always for us a window on the West through means of Western lecturers and Western literature. The theological speakers were not handpicked to toe the line.

Kasner took trips abroad as part of the National Front and was given the privilege of travelling to the West either by company car or private vehicle, which could be procured through Genex. On the other hand, his wife, Herlind, was forbidden to do so due to her position as a GDR teacher. A recruitment effort by the Stasi is presumed to have failed. Unlike the children in other pastors’ families, the higher education of the Kasner children was not impeded.

From the late 1960s onwards, Kasner criticised the social order of West Germany: he did not support reunification.

Kasner's regular interlocutors in terms of church politics were Wolfgang Schnur and Clemens de Maizière, the father of the later last GDR prime minister Lothar de Maizière. Schnur, later chairman of the opposition party Democratic Awakening, was a member of the Synod (cf. general assembly) of the Evangelical Lutheran State Church of Mecklenburg and temporarily vice president of the Synod of the Evangelical Church of the Union and the Synod of the Federation of the Protestant Churches in the GDR (Bund der Evangelischen Kirchen in der DDR). He was, alongside the Synod of the Berlin-Brandenburg Church, one of the earliest members of the Christian Democratic Union in East Germany. Also negotiating alongside Kasner, Schnur, and de Maizière with the East German government from 1979 to 1988 and its state secretary for church affairs, Klaus Gysi.

After Die Wende, Kasner advocated against further military use of the so-called Bombodrom, a military allotment in northern Brandenburg and fell out of good relations with Lothar de Maizière when the latter's association with the Stasi was exposed.
