= Willi Jentzsch =

German academic

- Born: 15 May 1886; Wolfen, Prussia, German Empire (now the Federal Republic of Germany)
- Died: 23 May 1936 (aged 50); Danzig, Free City of Danzig (now Gdańsk, Republic of Poland)
- Occupations: Teacher, Senator
- Spouse: Gertrud Drange
- Children: Herlind Jentzsch
- Parent(s): Friedrich Wilhelm Jentzsch (father); Wilhelmine Pauline Minna Wilde (mother)
- Relatives: Angela Merkel (granddaughter)

Willi Jentzsch (15 May 1886 – 23 May 1936) was a German teacher, school administrator and politician. He served as chairman of the Danziger Beamtenbund (Danzig Federation of Civil Servants) and was elected as one of the eleven Senators of the Free City of Danzig on 27 October 1926, but resigned on 1 November 1927 for health reasons. On 1 November 1927, he was appointed rector of the renowned Gymnasium St. Johann in Fleischergasse. In March 1936, he became school director in Danzig, and thus head of all elementary schools in the city-state.

== Family ==
Willi Jentzsch was the son of Wilhelm Jentzsch, a landowner (Gutsbesitzer) who belonged to a prominent family in Wolfen.

Jentzsch married Gertrud Alma Drange in 1921 in Danzig. She was the daughter of Emil Drange, who made career in the administration of the Eastern Prussian city of Elbing, and his wife Emma (née Wachs). Through their daughter Herlind, who married Horst Kasner, Willi and Gertrud Jentzsch were the maternal grandparents of Angela Merkel (née Kasner). After the death of Willi Jentzsch in 1936, his family relocated to Hamburg.

== Ancestry ==
Ancestors of Willi Jentzsch

2. Johann Christoph Jentzsch
2. Friedrich Wilhelm Jentzsch
5. Anna Marie Hanke
1. Willi Jentzsch
12. Friedrich August Wilde
6. Friedrich Carl Wilde
13. Marie Sophie Mißbach
3. Wilhelmine Pauline Minna Wilde
28. Johann Wilhelm Ehrenberg
14. Friedrich Gottlob Ehrenberg
29. Johanne Marie Sophie Grosse
7. Caroline Wilhelmine Ehrenberg
30. Johann Christoph Kretschmann
15. Rosine Elisabeth Kretschmann
31. Anna Rosina Schaaf
