= Ludwig Kasner =

German police officer (1896–1959)

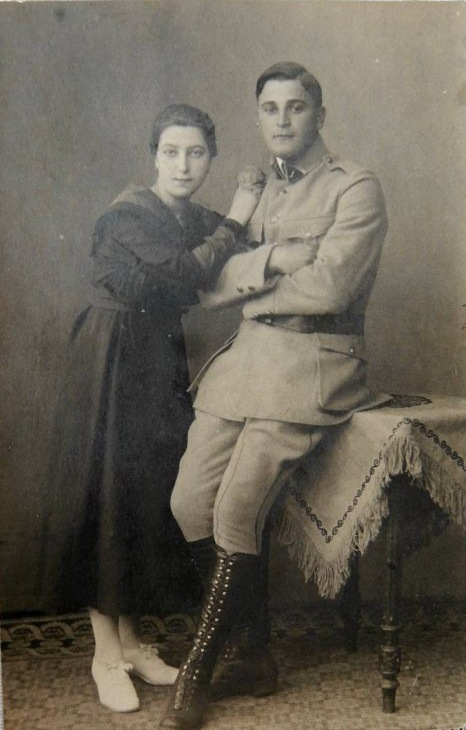
- Kasner in Polish Blue Army uniform, with Margarethe, his then-fiancée
- Born: Ludwik Marian Kaźmierczak; 17 October 1896; Posen, Prussia, German Empire (now Poznań, Poland)
- Died: 3 February 1959 (aged 62); Berlin-Karlshorst, East Germany
- Citizenship: Germany (until 1918; 1930–1959); Poland (1918–1930)
- Spouse: Marie Margarete Pörschke (m. 1925)
- Children: Horst
- Parents: Ludwik Wojciechowski (father); Anna Kaźmierczak (mother)
- Relatives: Angela Merkel (granddaughter)
- Police career
- Department: Berlin Police
- Service years: 1923–1933
- Rank: Hauptwachtmeister
- Military career
- Allegiance: German Empire (1915); Kingdom of Prussia (1915); Second Polish Republic (from 1917); Nazi Germany (1943–1945)
- Branch: Imperial German Army (1915); Prussian Army (1915); Blue Army (from 1917); German Army (1943–1945)
- Service years: 1915; 1917–1921; 1943–1945
- Conflicts: World War I; Western Front; Polish–Ukrainian War; Polish–Soviet War; World War II

Ludwig Marian Kasner (born Ludwik Marian Kaźmierczak; 17 October 1896 – 3 February 1959) was a German soldier and policeman who worked for the Berlin Police. He was the father of German theologian Horst Kasner and the paternal grandfather of former German Chancellor Angela Merkel.

Born to ethnic Polish parents in Posen (now Poznań), Kasner joined the Prussian Army and thus the Imperial German Army in 1915 and fought on the Western Front in World War I before being captured by the French later that year. Two years later in 1917, Kasner joined the Polish Blue Army (also known as "Haller's Army") and fought for Poland for the rest of World War I, and subsequently the Polish–Ukrainian War and the Polish–Soviet War until in 1921 where he retired from the army. Two years later in 1923, Kasner moved to Berlin where he joined the Berlin Police and was promoted twice, reaching the rank of Hauptwachtmeister ("chief watch master", the most senior constable rank).

In 1930, Kasner and his family officially changed their surname from their maiden Kaźmierczak, with Kasner also Germanising his name from Ludwik to Ludwig which was common at the time in order to integrate into German society. Despite this however, the family still kept in touch with their Polish relatives and remained in good terms. In 1933 during Adolf Hitler and the Nazi rise to power, Kasner was forced to step down and retire from the Berlin Police due to him being viewed by the new regime as "politically unreliable". In 1943, Kasner along with his son, Horst joined the German Army and fought for Nazi Germany during the final two years of World War II before leaving following Germany's defeat in the Battle of Berlin. After 1945, Kasner's profession was unknown.

In 2013, Kasner received media attention in Poland and Germany after a new book shed light on Angela Merkel's family background. This was not only due to Kasner's being of Polish origin, but also because Kasner's nephew had provided a photograph of him in the uniform of the Blue Army. Prior to that, little was known about Kasner, though Angela Merkel gave multiple references to him in 1995 and 2000 respectively.

== Life ==
Ludwig Kasner was born out of wedlock to Ludwik Wojciechowski and Anna Kaźmierczak (1867–1943), ethnic Poles and citizens of the German Empire from Posen (now Poznań, Poland). His mother was the daughter of Bartłomiej Kaźmierczak (born 1828) and Apolonia Bielejewicz (1826-1903). The Kaźmierczak name derives from Jan Kaźmierczak, an 18th-century Pole from the Poznań area.

In 1915, during World War I, Ludwig was drafted into the German Army and fought on the western front before being taken prisoner of war in France. He subsequently joined the Polish Blue Army, which fought for Polish independence on the side of the Entente Powers; it is not known whether he took part in fighting against Germany. With the Blue Army, he returned to Poland to fight in the Polish-Ukrainian War and the Polish-Soviet War.

After returning from war, in the aftermath of the Treaty of Versailles, Ludwig opted for German citizenship and relocated to Berlin, the hometown of his fiancée Marie Margarete Pörschke (August 11, 1905, in Berlin-Kreuzberg - November 9, 1986, in Berlin-Pankow). He worked in the Berlin Police, last in Berlin's Pankow district, and was promoted twice, reaching the rank of Hauptwachtmeister ("chief watch master", the most senior constable rank). In 1926 their son Horst Kaźmierczak was born.

In 1930 the family Germanized their surname from Kaźmierczak to Kasner. They still kept in touch with the Polish side of the family, visiting them in Poznań several times in the 1930s and receiving visits in Berlin from Polish relatives. Despite the surname change, Ludwig Kasner's nephew Zygmunt Rychlicki said Kasner always stayed true to his Polish roots.

Ludwig Kasner was raised a Catholic, but in the 1930s the family converted to Lutheranism, and his son became a Protestant pastor. Ludwig Kasner died on February 3, 1959, on the premises of the Soviet Military Administration in Germany at Berlin-Karlshorst. His occupation after 1945 is unknown.

Even before the 2013 media reports about Ludwig Kasner, Angela Merkel had said in 1995 that one of her grandfathers was originally from Poland; and in 2000 she had reiterated that she was one-quarter Polish.

== Ancestry ==
Ancestors of Ludwig Kasner

4. (Possibly) Józef Wojciechowski
2. (Possibly) Ludwik Wojciechowski
5. (Possibly) Franziska
1. Ludwig Kasner
24. Jan Kaźmierczak
12. Maciej Kaźmierczak
25. Marianna
6. Bartłomiej Kaźmierczak
26. Stanisław Gaszyński
13. Jadwiga Gaszyńska
27. Franciszka
3. Anna Kaźmierczak
28. Aleksander Bielejewicz
14. Aleksander Bielejewicz
29. Apolonia
7. Apolonia Bielejewicz
30. Antoni Sypkoski
15. Franziska Sypkoska
31. Brygida Dorocianka

== Literature ==
- Stefan Kornelius (2013), Die Kanzlerin und ihre Welt, ISBN 978-3-455-50291-6
