= Walerian Czuma =

Polish general and military commander

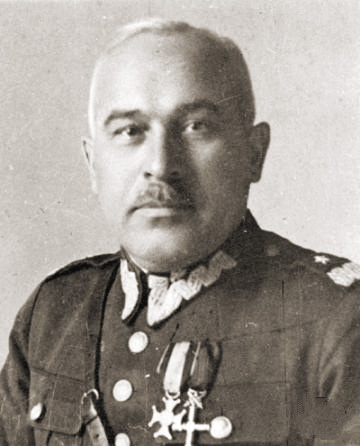
- Brigadier General Walerian Czuma
- Born: 24 December 1890; Niepołomice, Austria-Hungary (now Poland)
- Died: 7 April 1962 (aged 71); Penley, near Wrexham, Wales, UK
- Military career
- Allegiance: Poland
- Service years: 1914–1939
- Rank: Brigadier General
- Units: CO of the 5th Rifle Division, Border Guard and Warsaw garrison during the Siege of Warsaw
- Conflicts: Great War, Polish-Bolshevik War, Polish Defensive War
- Awards: Virtuti Militari Krzyz Niepodleglosci Polonia Restituta Cross of the Valorous Krzyz Zaslugi

Walerian Czuma (24 December 1890 – 7 April 1962) was a Polish general and military commander. He is notable for his command over a Polish unit in Siberia during the Russian Civil War, and the commander of the defence of Warsaw during the siege in 1939.

== Biography ==
At the outbreak of World War I Walerian Czuma joined the Piłsudski's Polish Legions. He was taken POW by the Russian Army and imprisoned in the Butyrka prison. Later he was sentenced to forced resettlement in Siberia. After the Russian Revolution of 1917 he started to organise Polish military units in Siberia, which eventually became known as the Polish 5th Rifle Division.

After the collapse of Kolchak's anti-Bolshevik movement, the Polish 5th Rifle Division, stranded in Siberia, was forced to surrender to the Red Army and Czuma was again imprisoned in Moscow, now Soviet Russia. After the Riga Peace Treaty he was allowed to return to Poland, where he rejoined the Polish Army.

From 1922 he served as the commanding officer of the 19th Infantry Division. Between 1927 and 1928 he was the commander of the Wilno (Modern-Day Vilnius, Lithuania) Fortified Area. Later he was the commanding officer of the 5th Division. In March 1938 he was assigned to the Ministry of Internal Affairs as the commanding officer of the Border Guards (Polish: Straż Graniczna). Between the wars Czuma was also an active member of several social organisations, among them the Guards of the Graves of Polish Heroes society which initiated the construction of Lwów Eagles mausoleum in Łyczaków Cemetery in Lwów.

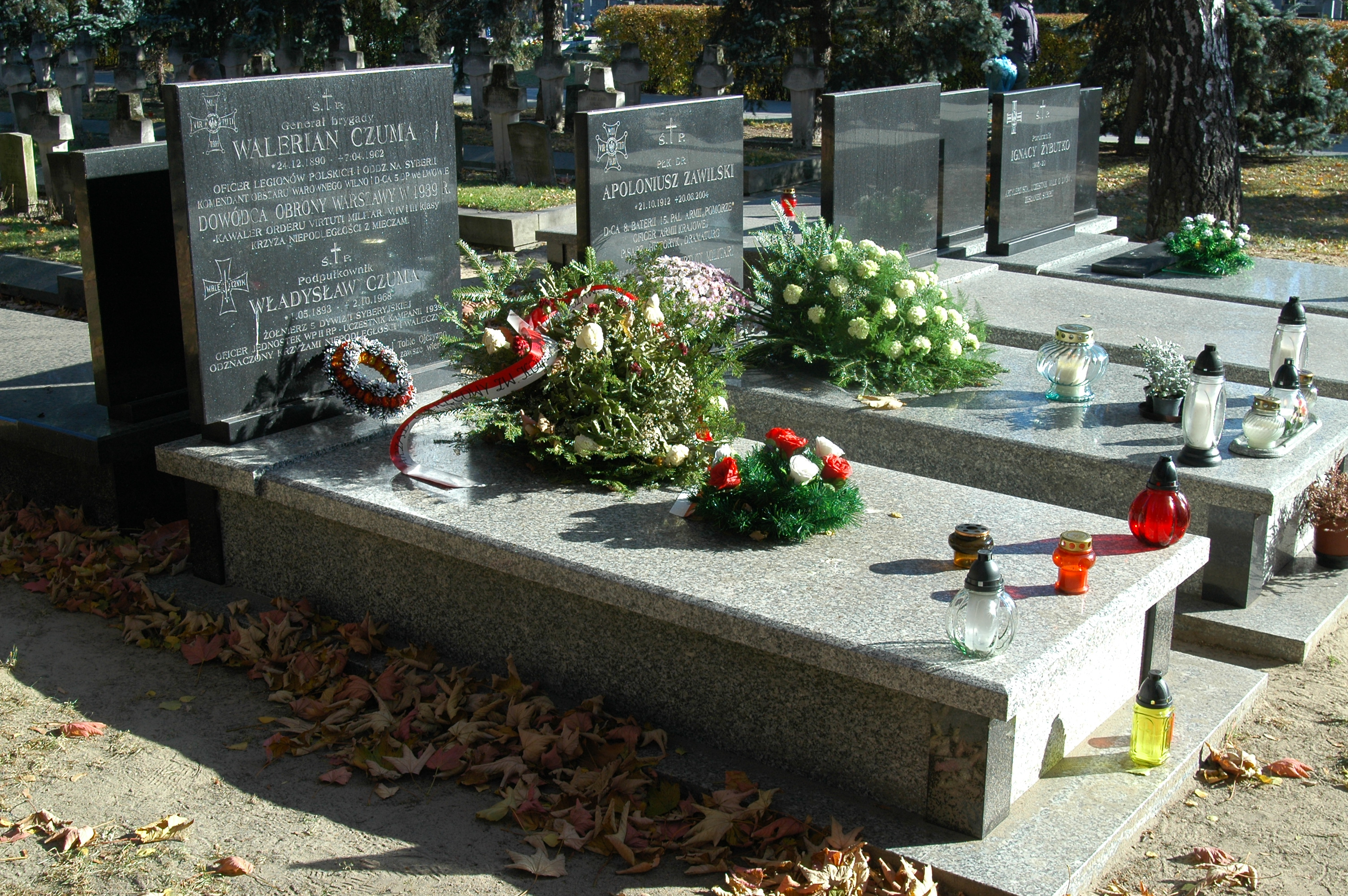
Tomb of Walerian Czuma and his brother at Warsaw's Powązki Military Cemetery

After the outbreak of the Polish Defensive War of 1939 he declined to leave Warsaw together with the government and the civilian authorities. On 3 September Marshal of Poland Edward Śmigły-Rydz ordered the creation of an improvised Command of the Defence of Warsaw (Dowództwo Obrony Warszawy) and Czuma became its commander. He commanded all the units fighting in the Siege of Warsaw, for which he was awarded the Virtuti Militari medal.

On 28 September 1939, Czuma was taken POW by the Germans and remained in various POW camps for the rest of World War II. After he was liberated from the Oflag VII-A Murnau POW camp in Murnau am Staffelsee, Germany, by the American forces, he joined the Polish Army in the West. The new Soviet-dominated communist authorities deprived him of Polish citizenship and Czuma chose to remain an emigre in the United Kingdom, where he died at Penley near Wrexham in 1962. He was initially buried at Wrexham but in July 2004 his remains and those of his brother Władysław were moved to Powązki Cemetery in Warsaw.

He is an uncle of Andrzej Czuma, Polish politician.

== Awards and decorations ==
- Knight's Cross of Virtuti Militari (1939)
- Gold Cross of Virtuti Militari (1939)
- Silver Cross of Virtuti Militari (17 May 1922)
- Commander's Cross of the Order of Polonia Restituta (11 November 1937)
- Cross of Independence with Swords (7 July 1931)
- Officer's Cross of the Order of Polonia Restituta (2 May 1923)
- Cross of Valour (four times)
- Gold Cross of Merit (twice in 1928 and in 1939
- Commemorative Medal for the War of 1918–1921
- Medal of the 10th Anniversary of Regained Independence
- Grand Officer of the Order of the Crown of Romania (Romania, 1929)
- Commander of the Légion d'honneur (France)
- Officer of the Order of Leopold(Belgium)
