= Blue Army (Poland) =

Military unit, 1917–1921

Błękitna Armia Armée bleue
- Armia Polska we Francji; Armée polonaise en France
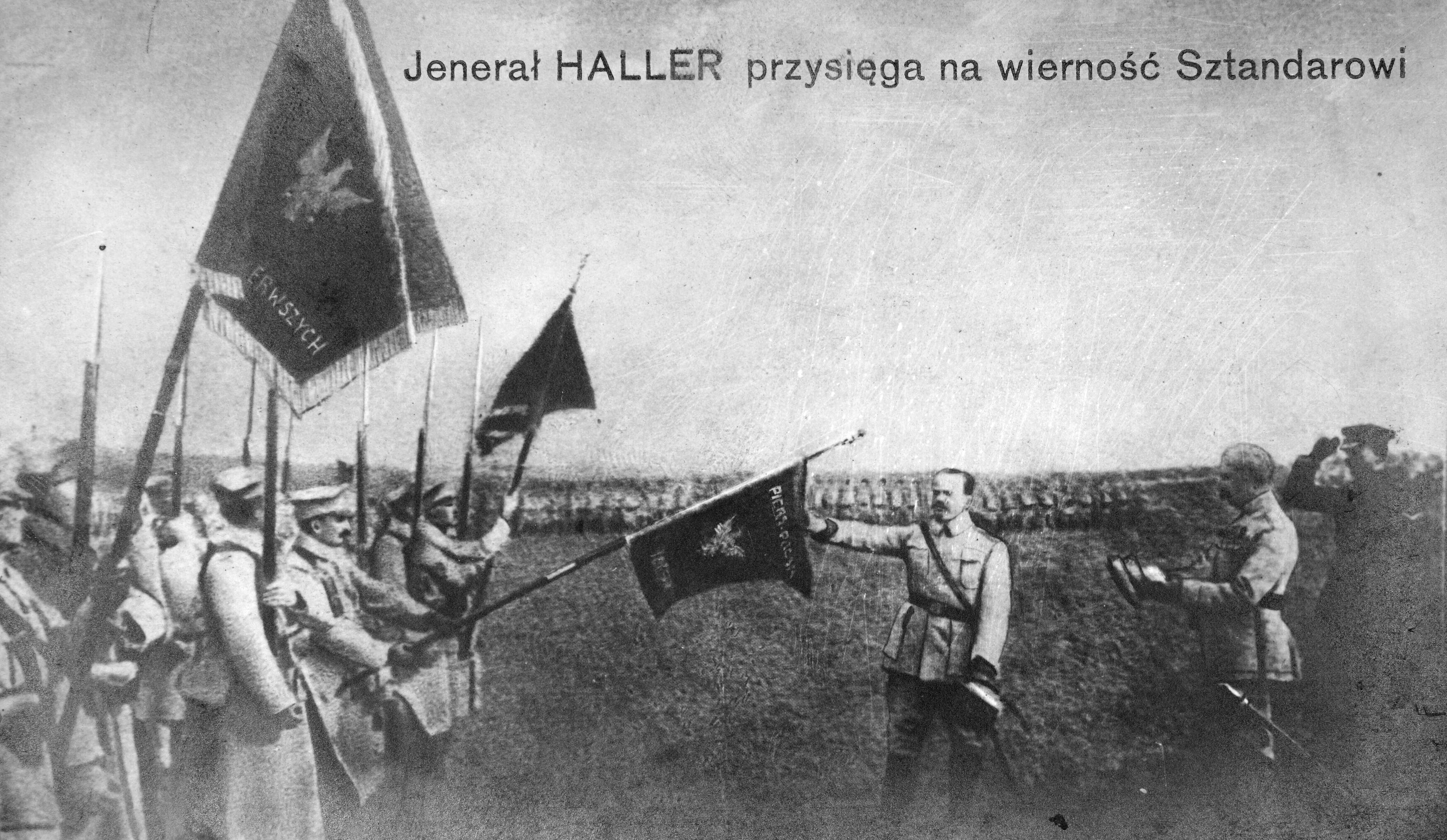
- General Józef Haller swearing for the Polish flag when he was nominated to command the Blue Army, c. 1918
- Active: 1917–1919
- Country: France; Poland
- Allegiance: Entente Powers; Whites (anti-Bolsheviks)
- Branch: Polish Legions
- Size: 68,500
- Nickname: "Haller's Army"
- Engagements: World War I Polish–Ukrainian War; Polish–Soviet War

Commanders
- General: Józef Haller von Hallenburg
- General: Louis Archinard

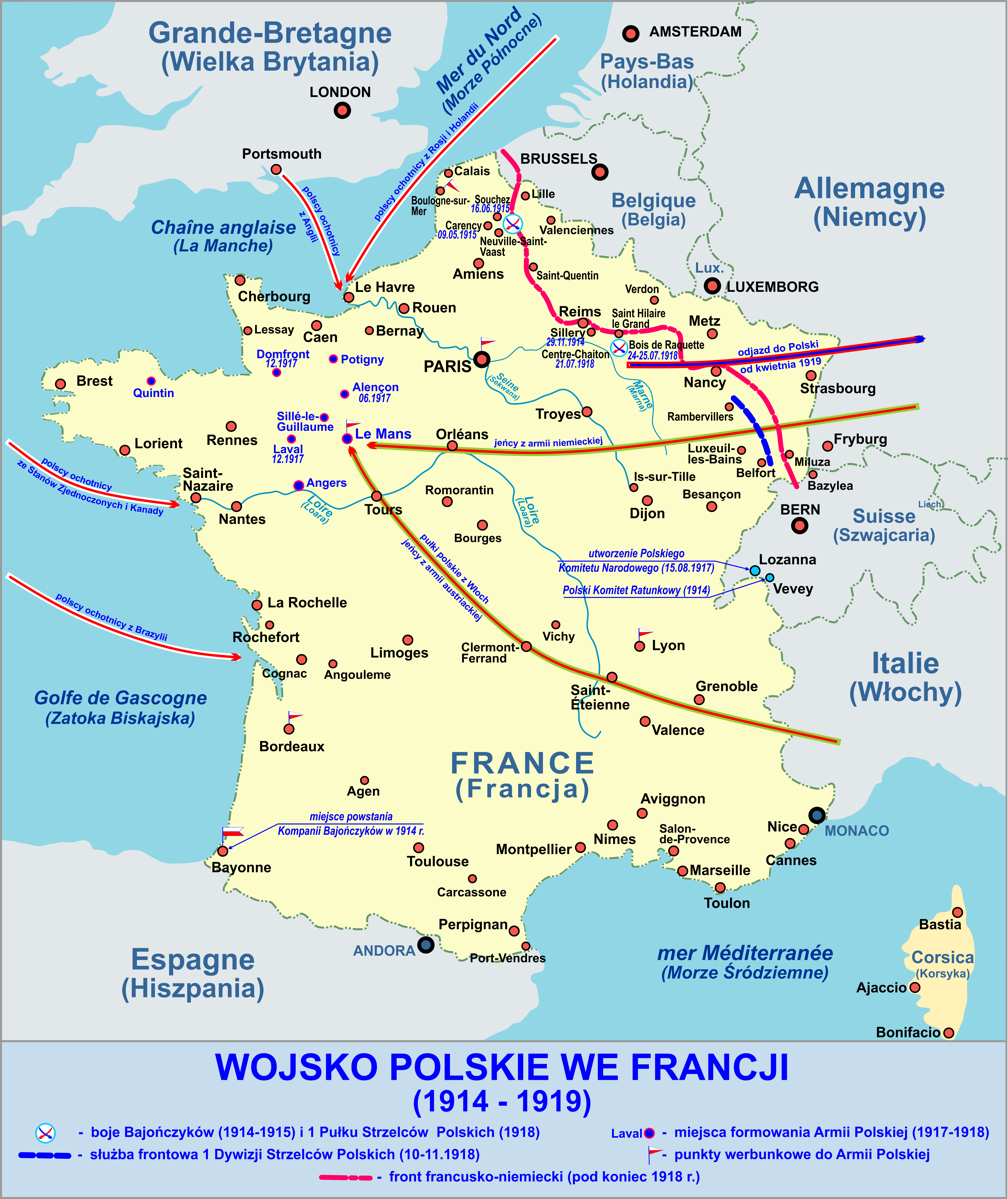

The so-called Blue Army (Polish: Błękitna Armia; French: Armée bleue), or Haller's Army, officially Armia Polska we Francji („Polish army in France“), was a Polish military contingent created in France during the latter stages of World War I. The name came from the French-issued blue military uniforms worn by the soldiers. The symbolic term used to describe the troops was subsequently adopted by General Józef Haller von Hallenburg to represent all newly organized Polish Legions fighting in western Europe.

The army was formed on 4 June 1917, and was made up of Polish volunteers serving alongside allied forces in France during World War I. After fighting on the Western Front, the army was transferred to Poland, where it joined other Polish military formations fighting for the return of Poland's independence. The Blue Army played a pivotal role in ensuring Polish victory in the Polish–Ukrainian War. Later Haller's troops took part in Poland's defeat of the advancing Bolshevik forces in the Polish–Soviet War.

== History ==
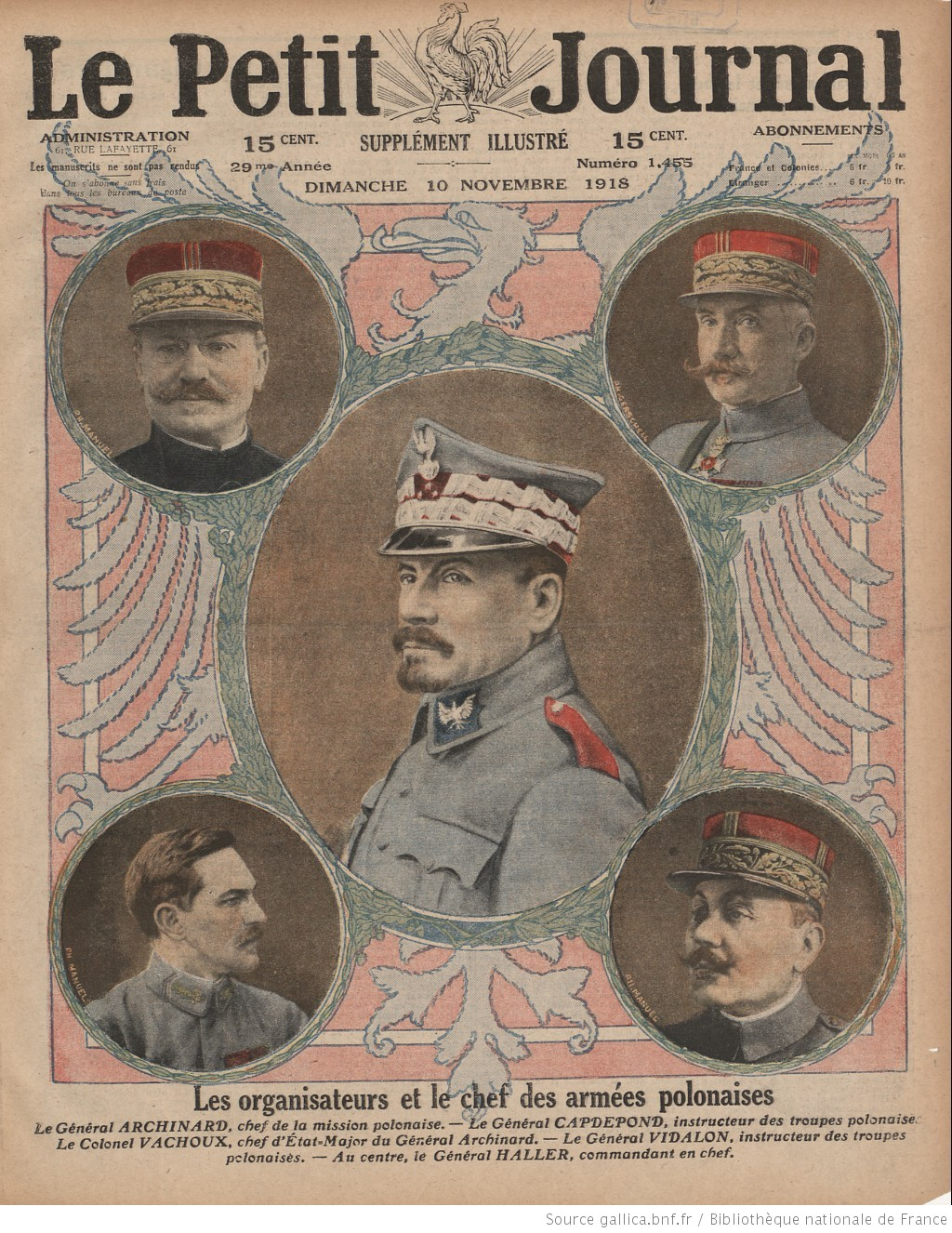
The leaders of the Polish armies

=== Background ===
==== Canadian origins ====
Beginning in 1914, the Polish community in North America began to organize in hopes of setting up a military organization with an end-goal of an independent Poland. In late 1914 a delegation was sent by the Polish-American group PCKR (Polski Centralny Komitet Ratunkowy / Polish Central Relief Committee) to Canada in hopes of setting up a Polish unit made up of North Americans of Polish ancestry, but the Canadian government rebuffed them. As the war dragged on, they tried again and found a supporter in Quebec industrialist William Evan Price III. With his contacts, the Polish delegation met Sam Hughes, the Canadian Minister of Militia and Defence, and pitched a "Polish Legion of Canada" composed of three battalions. This time there was considerable interest, and the Canadians sought and were given permission by British high command to start setting up a Polish Army Camp in Niagara-on-the-Lake. With permission granted the Polish army-in-exile called its camp "Tadeusz Kościuszko Camp," honouring a Polish patriot who led the 1794 Kościuszko Uprising aimed at freeing the country from Imperial Russia and the Kingdom of Prussia. Over 20,000 men trained in Canada, equipped and paid by France. Yet even though the camp was in Canada and supported financially by the French, the Americans viewed it as a threat to their neutrality.

==== America enters the war ====
The emergence of the Blue Army was closely associated with the American entry into World War I in April, 1917. A month earlier, Ignacy Jan Paderewski submitted a proposal to U.S. House of Representatives to accept Polish-American volunteers for service on the Western Front in the name of Poland's independence. Some 24,000 Poles were taken in (out of 38,000 who applied) and after a brief military training, they were sent to France to join General Haller, including many women volunteers (PSK). Polish-Americans were eager to fight for freedom and for the American-style democracy because they themselves escaped persecution by the empires who partitioned Poland a century earlier. When the war erupted, the American Polonia created the Polish Central Relief Committee to help with the war effort, although ethnically Polish volunteers arrived in France from all Polish diasporas at the same time numbering over 90,000 soldiers eventually. The Entente responded in kind by recognizing the Polish National Committee formed in France (led by Dmowski) as Poland's interim government, with Wilson's written promise (issued on 8 January 1918) to recreate a sovereign Polish state after their victory. Poland's long-term occupier, Tsarist Russia, got out of the war, overrun by the Bolsheviks who signed a treaty in Brest-Litovsk on 3 March 1918, which was voided after Imperial Germany was overthrown in November 1918 and the successor revolutionary government surrendered in the 11 November 1918 armistice.

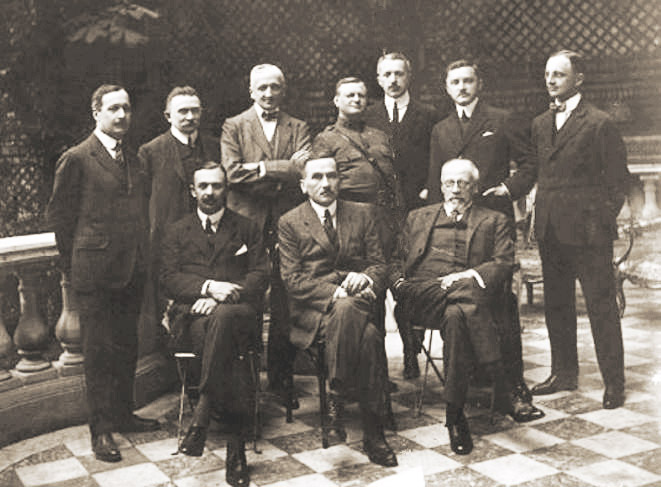
Komitet Narodowy Polski (Polish National Committee) sanctioned by France and other Western Allies as a provisional Polish government in Paris, 1918

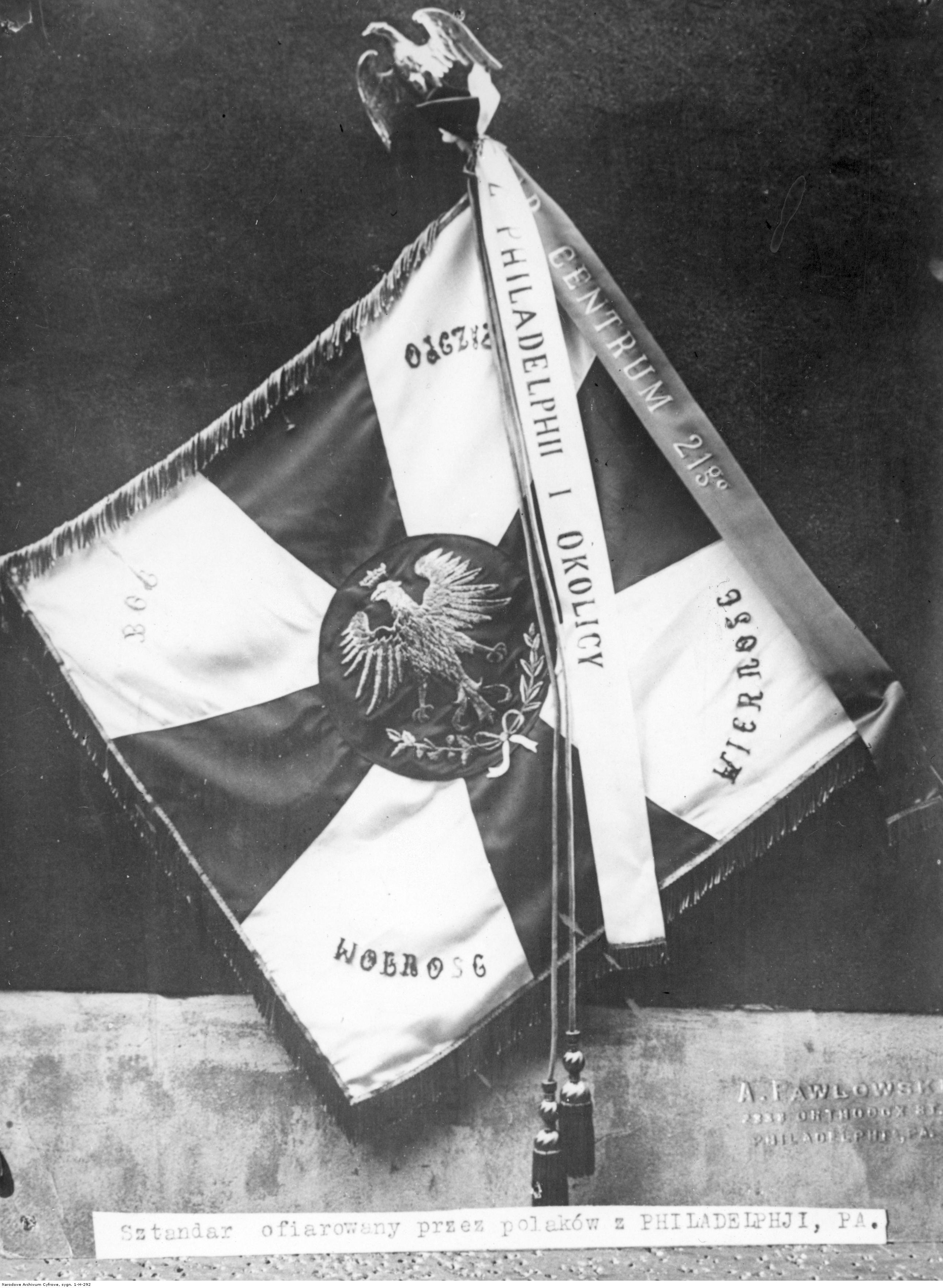
Flag offered to the Polish Army in France from Philadelphia, Pennsylvania.

The Blue Army was formally merged into the Polish Army after the Armistice between the Allies and Germany. Meanwhile, three interim Polish governments emerged independently of one another. A socialist government led by Daszyński was formed in Lublin. The National Committee emerged in Kraków. Daszyński (lacking support) decided to join forces with Piłsudski who was just released by the Germans from Magdeburg. On 16 November 1918, Poland declared independence. A decree defining the new republic was issued in Warsaw on 22 November 1918. A month later, Paderewski joined in from France. At about the same time, heavily armed Ukrainians from the Sitchovi Stril'ci (Sich Riflemen) seized the city of Lemberg, and the battle for the control of the city erupted against Piłsudski's legionaries. It was a high-stakes gamble with all sides attempting to establish a new regime ahead of the European peace conference in Versailles of January 1919. Similar Polish uprisings erupted in Poznań on 27 December 1918, Upper Silesia in August 1919 then again in 1920 and May 1921 — separated by the ad-hoc (or outright illegitimate) plebiscites with trainloads of German agents acting as local inhabitants. In the spring of 1919, the Blue Army (no longer needed in the West) was transported to Poland by train. The German forces were very slow to withdraw. In all, some 2,100 soldiers of the Blue Army who enlisted in France from the Polish diasporas died in the fighting, including over 50 officers serving with Haller. Over 1,600 men were wounded. Haller's army included 25,000 ethnic Poles drafted against their will by the German and Austrian armies, out of 50,000 conscripts from across partitioned Poland. They joined Haller from the POW camps in Italy in 1919. The final borders of Poland were set only in October, 1921 by the League of Nations.

=== World War I ===
==== Western Front ====
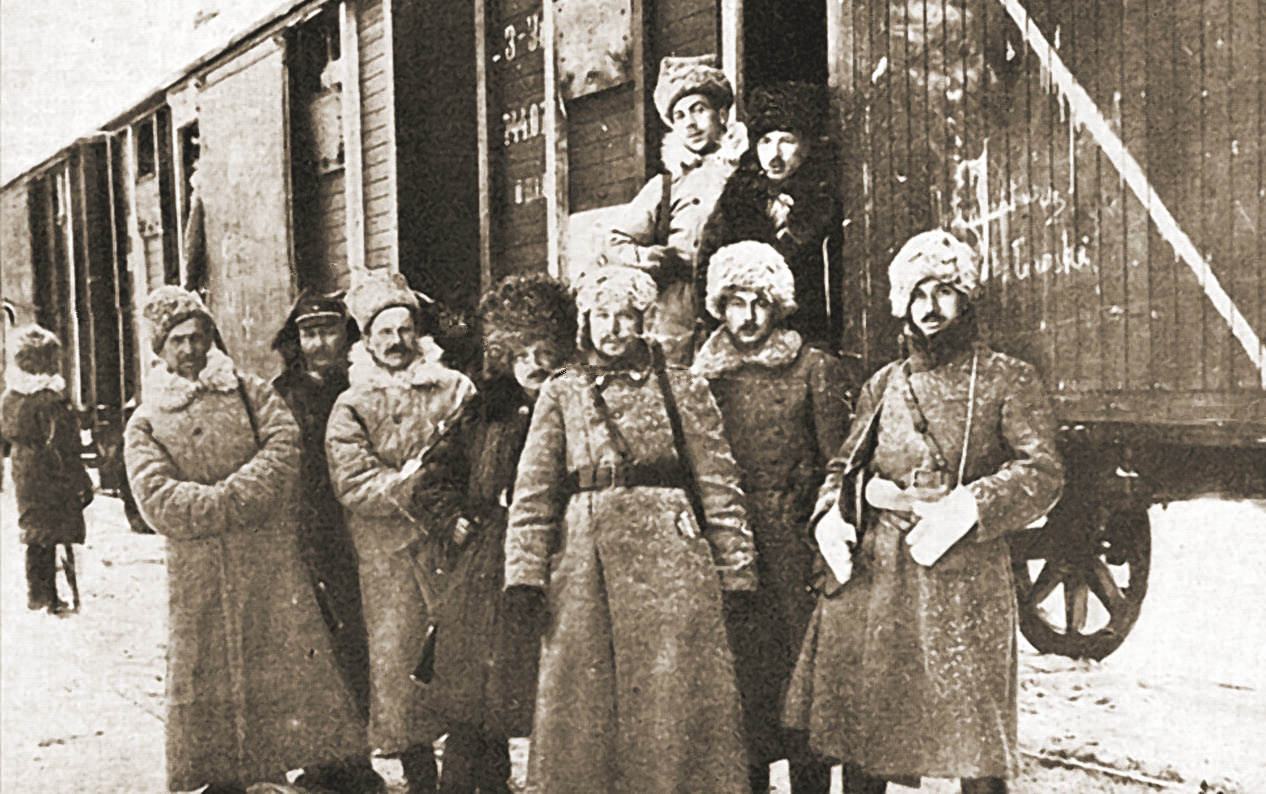
Soldiers of the 5th Rifle Division in Siberia, c.1919

The first divisions were formed after the official signing of a 1917 alliance by French President Raymond Poincaré and the Polish statesman Ignacy Jan Paderewski. The majority of the recruits, approximately 35,000 of them, were either Poles serving in the French Army or former captured Polish prisoners of war, who were conscripted and forced to serve in the German Heer and Austrian Imperial-Royal Landwehr armies. Many other Poles also joined from all over the world—these units included recruits from the United States with an additional 23,000 Polish-American volunteers and former troops of the Russian Expeditionary Force in France. Members of the Polish diaspora community in Brazil joined the army, with more than 300 men volunteering as well.

The Blue Army was initially placed under direct French military control and commanded by General Louis Archinard. However, on 23 February 1918, political and military sovereignty was granted to the Polish National Committee, and soon after that, the army was directly commanded by independent Polish authorities. Also, more units were formed, most notably the 4th and 5th Rifle Divisions in Russia. On 28 September 1919, Russian government officials formally signed an agreement with the Entente that officially recognized the Polish military units in France as "the only independent, allied and co-belligerent Polish army." On 4 October 1918, the National Committee appointed General Józef Haller von Hallenburg as chief commander of the Polish Legions in France. The first unit to enter combat on the Western Front was the 1st Rifle Regiment (1 Pułk Strzelców Polskich) fighting from July 1918 in Champagne and the Vosges mountains. By October, the entire 1st Rifle Division had joined the campaign around the area of Rambervillers and Raon-l'Étape.

==== Transfer to Poland ====
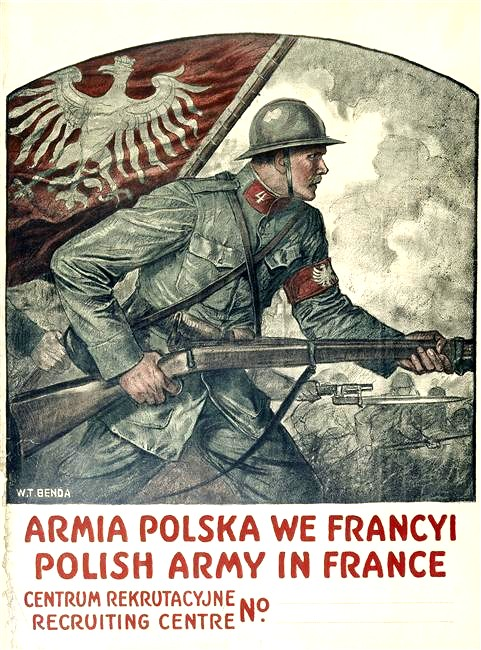
American recruitment poster for the Polish Army in France by W.T. Benda.

The army continued to gather recruits after the end of World War I. Many of these new volunteers were ethnic Poles who were conscripted into the German, Austrian and Russian armies, and later discharged following the signing of the armistice agreement on 11 November 1918. By early 1919, the Blue Army numbered 68,500 men and was fully equipped by the French government. After being denied permission by German officials to enter Poland via the Baltic port city of Danzig (Gdańsk), transportation was arranged via rail.

Between April and June of that year, all the army units were moved to a newly independent Poland, across Germany in sealed train cars. Weapons were secured in separate compartments and kept under guard to appease German concerns about a foreign army traversing its territory. Immediately after its arrival, the divisions were integrated into the regular Polish Army and sent to the front lines to fight in the Polish–Ukrainian War, which was being contested in eastern Galicia. The perilous journey from France (through revolutionary Germany) to Poland in the spring of 1919 was documented by those who lived through it.

Captain Stanisław I. Nastal: Preparations for the departure lasted for some time. The question of transit became a difficult and complicated problem. Finally after a long wait a decision was made and officially agreed upon between the Allies and Germany. The first transports with the Blue Army set out in the first half of April, 1919. Train after train tore along though Germany to the homeland, to Poland.

Major Stefan Wyczółkowski: On 15 April 1919 the regiment began its trip to Poland from the Bayon railroad station in four transports, via Mainz, Erfurt, Leipzig, Kalisz, and Warsaw, and arrived in Poland, where it was quartered in individual battalions; in Chełm 1st Battalion, supernumerary company and command of the regiment; 3rd Battalion in Kowel; and the 2nd Battalion in Wlodzimierz.

Major Stanisław Bobrowski: On 13 April 1919 the regiment set out across Germany for Poland, to reinforce other units of the Polish army being created in the homeland amid battle, shielding with their youthful breasts the resurrected Poland.

Major Jerzy Dąbrowski: Finally on 18 April 1919 the regiment's first transport set out for Poland. On 23 April 1919 the leading divisions of the 3rd Regiment of Polish Riflemen set foot on Polish soil, now free thanks to their own efforts.

Lt. Wincenty Skarzyński: Weeks passed. April 1919 arrived – then plans were changed: it was decided irrevocably to transport our army to Gdańsk instead by trains, through Germany. Many officers came from Poland, among them Major Gorecki, to coordinate technical details with General Haller.

=== Polish–Ukrainian War ===
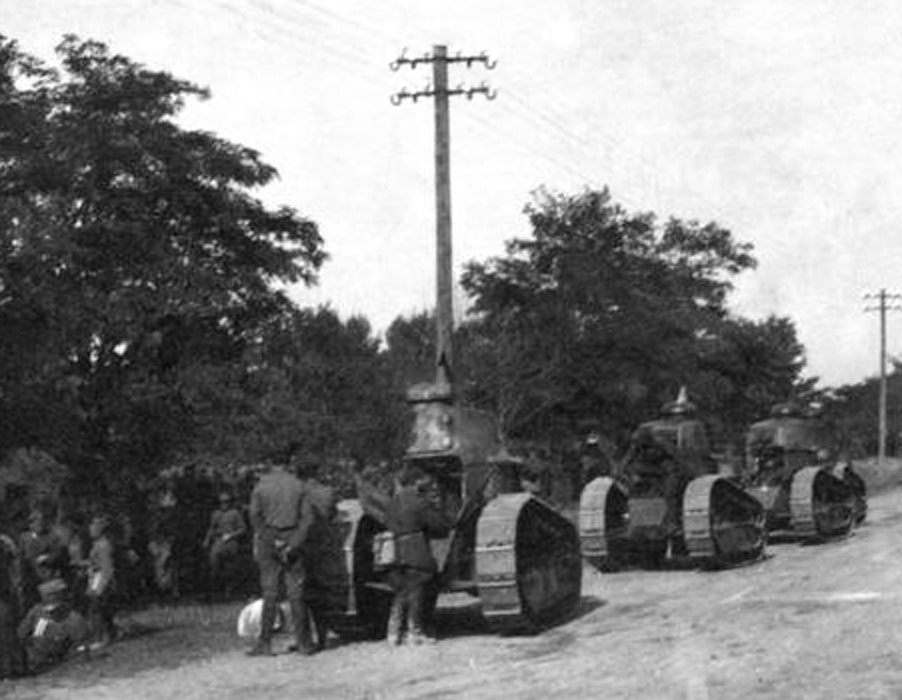
Blue Army's FT-17 tanks near the city of Lwów (Lviv); Polish–Ukrainian War, c.1919

Haller's troops changed the balance of power in Galicia and Volhynia. Their arrival allowed the Poles to repel the Ukrainians and establish a demarcation line at the river Zbruch on 14 May 1919. The Blue Army was equipped by the Western Allies, and supported by experienced French officers specifically ordered to fight against the Bolsheviks in the Polish–Soviet War, but not the forces of the Western Ukrainian People's Republic. Despite the diplomatic conditions, the Poles dispatched Haller's Army against the Ukrainians first, instead of the Bolsheviks. The tactical initiative was done in order to break the stalemate in eastern Galicia. In response, the allies sent several telegrams ordering the Polish government to halt its offensive, as using the allied-equipped army against the Western Ukrainian People's Republic specifically contradicted the status of the French military advisors, but the demands were ignored. The offensive by the Blue Army succeeded in breaking the stalemate and brought about a collapse of the West Ukrainian army. In July 1919, after securing victory on the Ukrainian front, the Blue Army was transferred to the border with Germany in Silesia, where it prepared defensive positions against a possible German invasion of Poland from the west.

=== Polish–Bolshevik War ===
During the Polish-Bolshevik War several Blue Army formations were merged with the regular Polish army, and jointed together to form the 49th Hutsul Rifle Regiment and 18th Infantry Division. Haller's well trained and highly motivated troops, as well as their British built Bristol F.2 reconnaissance planes, Italian made Ansaldo A.1 Balilla fighter planes and French FT-17 tanks, also played a significant role in the war. The Polish-American first engaged the Bolshevik forces near the town of Rivne (Równe in Polish) on 18 June 1919. After pushing the Bolsheviks east, the Blue Army advance halted and the troops engaged in small skirmishes until the end of the war. Haller's troops would try to entrap small units of Bolshevik soldiers as well as raid garrisons for food, ammunition and to spread panic amongst the enemy.

=== Post-war ===
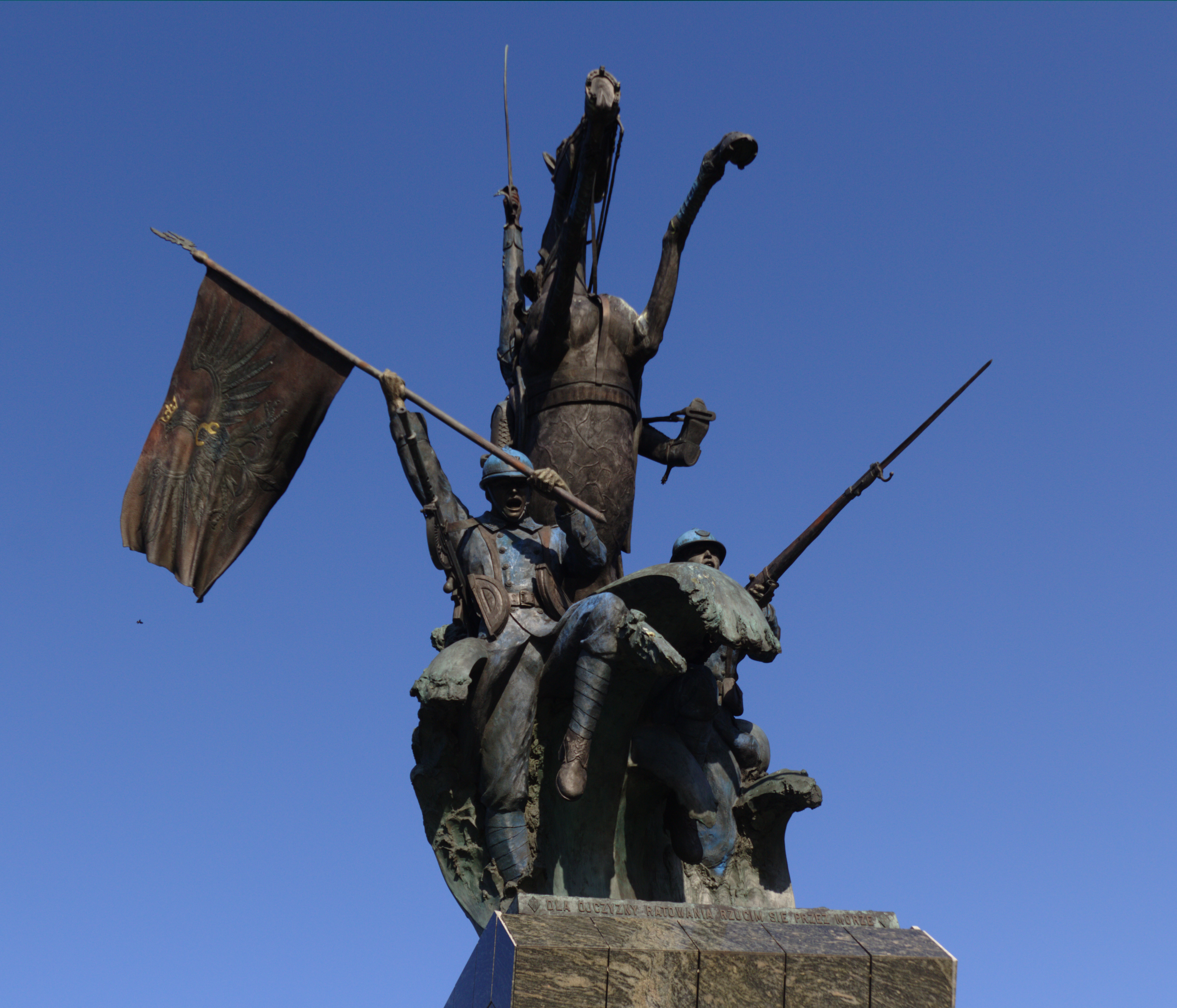
Blue Army's monument in the Żoliborz district of Warsaw

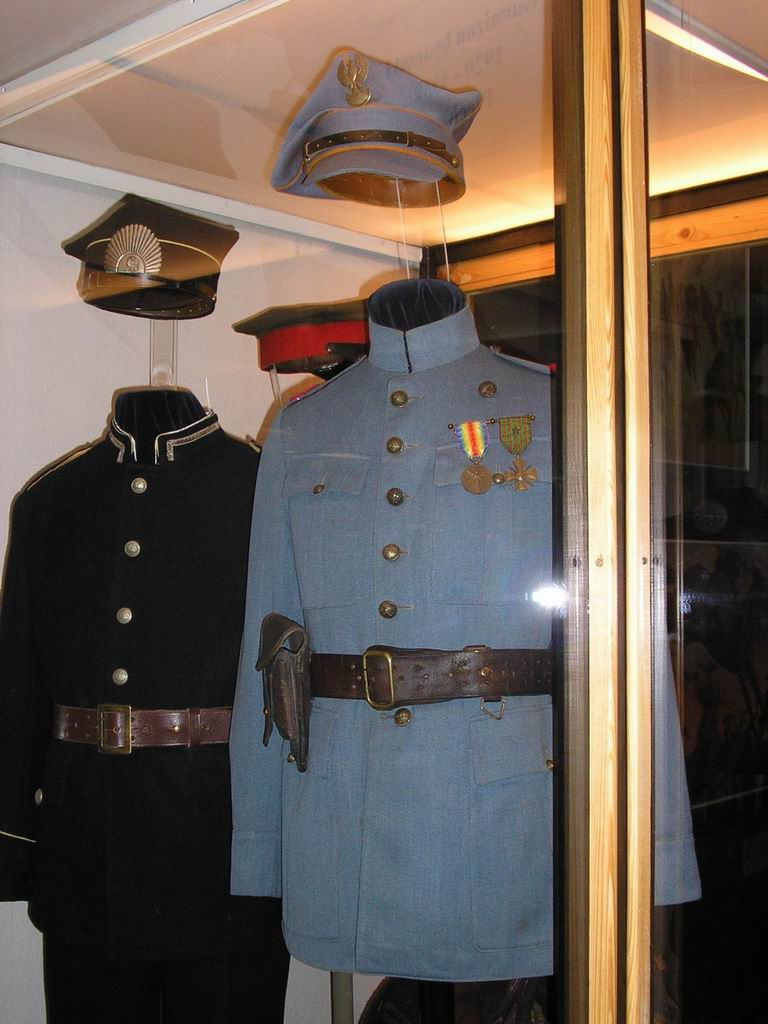
Uniform of a Blue Army officer (right)

The Blue Army's 15th Infantry Rifle Regiment formed a basis for the 49th Hutsul Rifle Regiment (part of the 11th Carpathian Infantry Division) after the end of World War I.

During the Communist crackdown in Poland after World War II, most of the history related to the Polish-Soviet War and the Blue Army was censored, distorted and repressed by the Soviet authorities.

=== Anti-Jewish violence ===
Throughout the fighting on the Ukrainian front, soldiers from the Blue Army assaulted local Jews, believing that some of them were cooperating with Poland's enemies. In eastern Galicia this included fighting a Jewish battalion of the Ukrainian Galician Army under the leadership of Solomon Leinberg.

On 27 May 1919 a soldier by the name of Stanisław Dziadecki who served in one of the Blue Army's rifle divisions in Częstochowa, was shot and wounded while on patrol. A Jewish tailor was suspected of the shooting, and was promptly executed by Haller's soldiers and accompanying civilians, who proceeded to loot Jewish homes and businesses, killing 5-10 Jews and injuring several dozen more. Pavel Korzec wrote that as the army traveled further east, some of Haller's soldiers, as a way to exact retribution, continued to loot Jewish properties and engage in violence. Willian Hagen described Haller's troops together with civilian mobs as assaulting Jewish policemen, beating worshipers and destroying Jewish prayer books in synagogues in eastern Chełm. Polish police and regular army soldiers were occasionally able to restrain Haller's troops.

According to Howard Sachar, in the year and a half prior to the Blue Army's arrival, the total number of Jewish casualties in the region was between 400 and 500; Haller's troops' violence caused this number to double. The Morgenthau Report estimated that the total number of Jews killed as a result of actions made by the Polish military (including the Blue Army) did not exceed 200–300. As a result of the Blue Army's activities, General Haller's visit to the United States was met with protests from American Jewish and Ukrainian communities. Tadeusz Piotrowski wrote that in most cases it's impossible to disentangle gratuitous antisemitism from commonplace looting and soldier brutality. He claims that the term "pogrom" in the accepted sense of the deliberate killing of Jewish civilians could not be applied to the great majority of the incidents in which the Blue Army was involved.

==== Causes ====
According to Alexander Prusin there were a number of causes for the anti-semitic acts of the Polish forces. Socioeconomic tensions regarding land reforms and conflation of Jews with the landed class led to the feelings of hostility. Also, the lack of appropriate government compensation to the Polish soldiers led to soldiers viewing the looting of Jews as partial re-compensation for their service. For soldiers from Western Poland who remembered how many Jews have previously collaborated with Germany during a recent Polish-German conflict in 1919, this allowed framing of anti-semitic attacks as retribution on enemies of the Polish nation. Further, for many Poles Jews were associated with Bolshevism, and the Endeks in particular promoted the stereotype of Jewish Bolshevism. Likewise, according to Joanna Michlic, some perpetrators of anti-Jewish violence legitimized their actions in the name of national self defense. Officers and soldiers in the Blue Army expressed these tendencies, and often treated all Jews as communists, despite the traditional religious character and political diversity of Jewish communities. Some of the more significant incidents of abuse were inflicted by the Polish-American volunteers. It is likely that the cultural shock of finding themselves confronted by a multitude of unfamiliar ethnic, political and religious groups that inhabited Western Ukraine led to a feeling of vulnerability, that in turn provoked the violent outbursts. Encyclopaedia Judaica writes that because of its French ties the Blue Army enjoyed independence from the main Polish command, and some of its soldiers exploited this when engaging in undisciplined action against Jewish communities in Galicia.

== Personnel ==
=== Veteran status of Polish-American volunteers ===
After the war, the Polish-American volunteers who served within Haller's Army were not recognized as veterans by either the American or Polish governments. This led to friction between the Polish community in the United States and the Polish government, and resulted in the subsequent refusal by Polish-Americans to again help the Polish cause militarily.

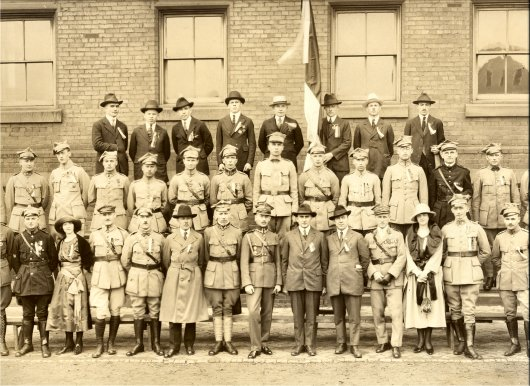
Polish Veterans Association Convention Cleveland Ohio 1921

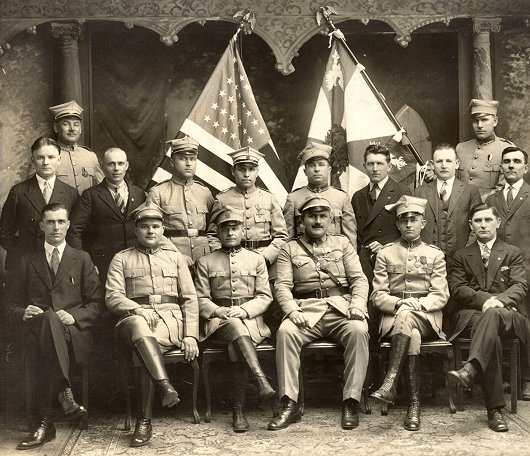
Polish Veterans Association Elizabeth City New Jersey 1928

Polish-Americans who fought in the Blue Army. Image taken in Detroit, Michigan (1955) and featured in Life Magazine

=== Jewish volunteers ===
Polish Jews enlisted and fought alongside ethnic Poles within the Blue Army, serving as soldiers, doctors and nurses. According to Edward Goldstein writing in The Galitzianer, on examining a list of 1,381 casualty names compiled by Paul Valasek, he identified 62 (or approximately 5%) Jewish sounding names in the list.

=== Notable persons ===
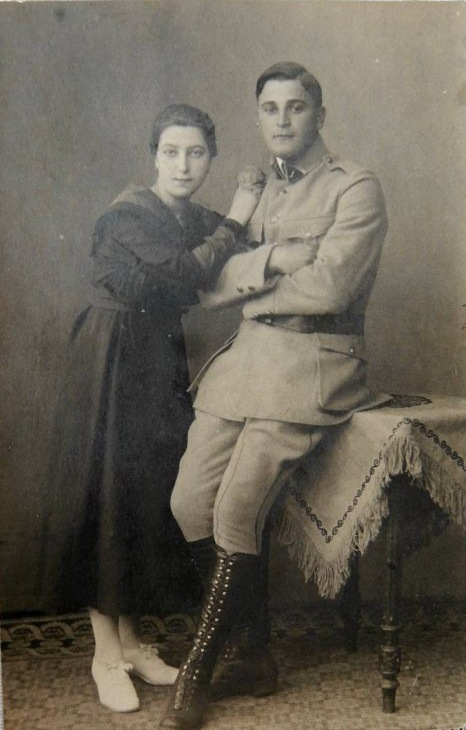
Ludwik Marian Kaźmierczak the paternal grandfather of the German chancellor Angela Merkel, in Blue Army uniform, 1919

- Ludwik Marian Kaźmierczak, the paternal grandfather of the German chancellor Angela Merkel, and an ethnic Pole born in Posen (Poznań), German Empire served in the Blue Army. During World War I, he was drafted into the German Army in 1915 and fought on the western front. After being taken as a prisoner of war in France, he joined the Blue Army, and subsequently fought in the Polish-Ukrainian and Polish-Soviet wars. After ending his service Kaźmierczak emigrated back to Germany.
- Stanislaw Jackowski, Commander of the II Batallon of the 1st Tank Regiment.
- Jan Wilczek, the paternal grandfather of an American theoretical physicist and Nobel laureate Frank Wilczek.

== Order of battle ==
The order of battle shows the hierarchical organization of an armed force participating in a military operation or campaign. The Blue Army order of battle was as follows:

- I Polish Corps
  - 1st Rifle Division
  - 2nd Rifle Division
  - 1st Heavy Artillery Regiment
- II Polish Corps
  - 4th Rifle Division
  - 5th Rifle Division
- III Polish Corps
  - 3rd Rifle Division
  - 6th Rifle Division
  - 3rd Heavy Artillery Regiment
- Independent Units
  - 7th Rifle Division
  - 1st Tank Regiment
  - Training Division – cadre

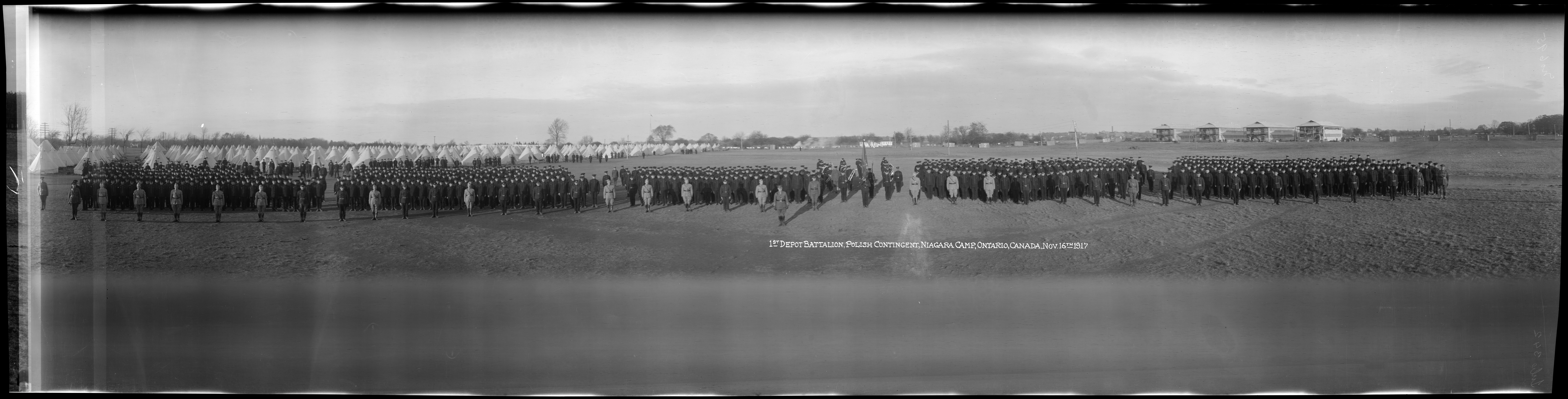
1st Depot Battalion Polish Contingent, Niagara Camp in Ontario Canada, 16 November 1917

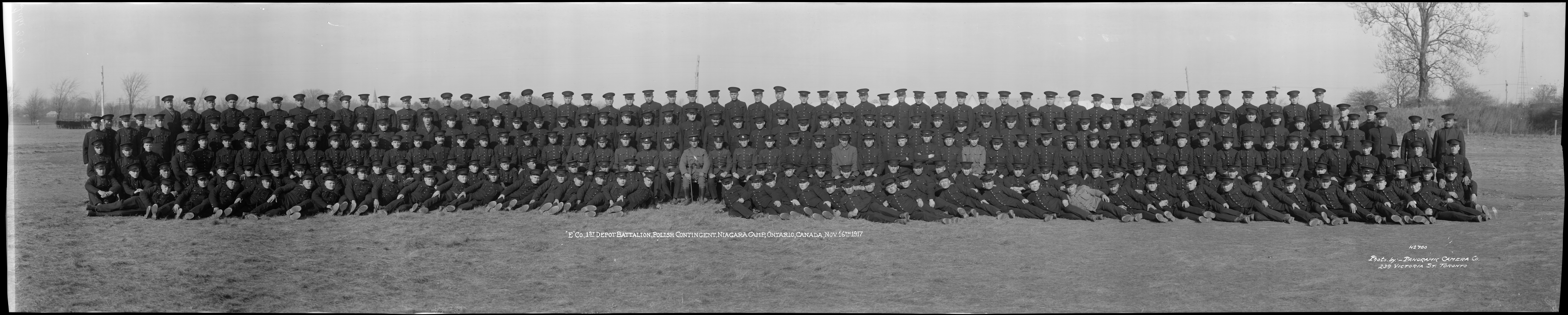
'E' Company, 1st Depot Battalion Polish Contingent, Niagara Camp in Ontario Canada, 16 November 1917

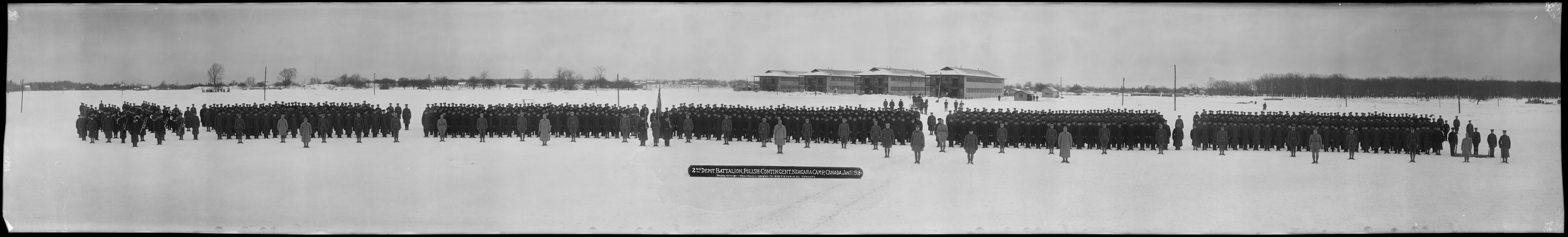
Jan 11, 1918, Polish Blue Army 2nd Depot Battalion Polish Contingent at the Canadian Niagara Camp

== See also ==
- French Military Mission to Poland
- Polish Legions in World War I

== Bibliography ==
Notes

References

- Biskupski, M. B. (1999). "Canada and the Creation of a Polish Army, 1914–1918". The Polish Review. 44 (3): 339–380. ISSN 2330-0841. JSTOR 25779141. LCCN 57034642. OCLC 260158745.
- Hapak, Joseph T. (1991). "Selective service and Polish Army recruitment during World War I". Journal of American Ethnic History. 10 (4). University of Illinois Press on behalf of the Immigration & Ethnic History Society: 38–60. ISSN 0278-5927. JSTOR 27500870.
- Hind, Andrew (27 January 2015). "Polish Patriots: in Niagara-on-the-Lake 1917-1918". Today Magazine.
- Pliska, Stanley R. (1965). "The 'Polish-American Army' 1917–1921". The Polish Review. 10 (3): 46–59. ISSN 2330-0841. JSTOR 25776612. LCCN 57034642. OCLC 260158745.
- Ruskoski, David Thomas (28 July 2006). The Polish Army in France: Immigrants in America, World War I Volunteers in France, Defenders of the Recreated State in Poland (PhD thesis). Georgia State University.
- Skrzeszewski, Stan (2014). The Daily Life of Polish Soldiers Niagara Camp, 1917-1919 The Newspaper Columns of Elizabeth Ascher, St. Catharines Standard, 1917-1919 (PDF). Niagara Historical Museum. Archived from the original (PDF) on 10 October 2018. - Total pages: 100
- Strauss, Herbert A. (1993). Current Research on Anti-Semitism: Hostages of Modernization, Volumes 2-3. Walter de Gruyter. ISBN 9783110137156. - Total pages: 1427
- Valasek, Paul S. (2006). Haller's Polish Army in France. Whitehall Printing. ISBN 9780977975709. - Total pages: 432
