= Vorpommern-Rügen – Vorpommern-Greifswald I =

Federal electoral district of Germany

15 Vorpommern-Rügen – Vorpommern-Greifswald I
- Electoral district for the Bundestag
- Vorpommern-Rügen – Vorpommern-Greifswald I in 2025
- State: Mecklenburg-Vorpommern
- Population: 294,400 (2019)
- Electorate: 241,066 (2021)
- Major settlements: Greifswald; Stralsund
- Area: 3,475.8 km^{2}

Current electoral district
- Created: 1990
- Party: AfD
- Member: Dario Seifert
- Elected: 2025

Vorpommern-Rügen – Vorpommern-Greifswald I is an electoral constituency (German: Wahlkreis) represented in the Bundestag. It elects one member via first-past-the-post voting. Under the current constituency numbering system, it is designated as constituency 15. It is located in northeast Mecklenburg-Vorpommern, comprising the Vorpommern-Rügen district and a small part of the Vorpommern-Greifswald district.

Vorpommern-Rügen – Vorpommern-Greifswald I was created for the inaugural 1990 federal election after German reunification. From 2021 to 2025, it was represented by Anna Kassautzki of the Social Democratic Party (SPD). Since 2025 it has been represented by Dario Seifert of the AfD.

== Geography ==
Vorpommern-Rügen – Vorpommern-Greifswald I is located in northeast Mecklenburg-Vorpommern. As of the 2021 federal election, it comprises the entirety of the Vorpommern-Rügen district, as well as the municipality of Greifswald and the Amt of Landhagen from the Vorpommern-Greifswald district.

== History ==
Vorpommern-Rügen – Vorpommern-Greifswald I was created after German reunification in 1990, then known as Stralsund – Rügen – Grimmen. Until 2002, it was constituency 267 in the numbering system. Originally, it comprised the now-abolished districts of Grimmen, Rügen, and Stralsund, and the independent city of Stralsund. In the 2002 election, it was expanded to contain the former Ribnitz-Damgarten district, which had been abolished in 1994; it now covered the entirety of the later-abolished Nordvorpommern district. At this time, it was renamed to Stralsund – Nordvorpommern – Rügen, and acquired its current constituency number of 15. In the 2013 election, it was further expanded to include the independent city of Greifswald and the Amt of Landhagen, and was renamed to Vorpommern-Rügen – Vorpommern-Greifswald I.

Election	No.	Name	Borders
1990	267	Stralsund – Rügen – Grimmen	Stralsund city; Grimmen district; Rügen district; Stralsund district
1994	267	Stralsund – Rügen – Grimmen	Stralsund city; Grimmen district; Rügen district; Stralsund district
1998	267	Stralsund – Rügen – Grimmen	Stralsund city; Grimmen district; Rügen district; Stralsund district
2002	15	Stralsund – Nordvorpommern – Rügen	Stralsund city; Nordvorpommern district; Rügen district
2005	15	Stralsund – Nordvorpommern – Rügen	Stralsund city; Nordvorpommern district; Rügen district
2009	15	Stralsund – Nordvorpommern – Rügen	Stralsund city; Nordvorpommern district; Rügen district
2013	15	Vorpommern-Rügen – Vorpommern-Greifswald I	Vorpommern-Rügen district; Vorpommern-Greifswald district (only Greifswald municipality and Landhagen Amt)
2017	15	Vorpommern-Rügen – Vorpommern-Greifswald I	Vorpommern-Rügen district; Vorpommern-Greifswald district (only Greifswald municipality and Landhagen Amt)
2021	15	Vorpommern-Rügen – Vorpommern-Greifswald I	Vorpommern-Rügen district; Vorpommern-Greifswald district (only Greifswald municipality and Landhagen Amt)
2025	15	Vorpommern-Rügen – Vorpommern-Greifswald I	Vorpommern-Rügen district; Vorpommern-Greifswald district (only Greifswald municipality and Landhagen Amt)

== Members ==
The constituency was held continuously by Angela Merkel of the Christian Democratic Union (CDU) from its formation until her retirement. Merkel served as leader of the CDU from 2000 and Chancellor of Germany from 2005 until 2021. In the 2021 federal election, it was won by Anna Kassautzki of the Social Democratic Party (SPD).

Election	Member	Party	%
1990	Angela Merkel	CDU	48.5
1994	Angela Merkel	CDU	48.6
1998	Angela Merkel	CDU	37.3
2002	Angela Merkel	CDU	41.6
2005	Angela Merkel	CDU	41.3
2009	Angela Merkel	CDU	49.3
2013	Angela Merkel	CDU	56.2
2017	Angela Merkel	CDU	44.0
2021	Anna Kassautzki	SPD	24.3
2025	Dario Seifert	AfD	37.3

== Election results ==
=== 2025 election ===
Federal election (2025): Vorpommern-Rügen – Vorpommern-Greifswald I
Notes:	Blue background denotes the winner of the electorate vote. Pink background denotes a candidate elected from their party list. Yellow background denotes an electorate win by a list member, or other incumbent. A ✓ or ✗ denotes status of any incumbent, win or lose respectively.						
Party	Candidate	Votes	%	±%	Party votes	%	±%
AfD	Dario Seifert	68,842	37.3	▲17.4	65,647	35.5	▲16.6
CDU	Georg Günther	39,235	21.2	▲0.8	32,675	17.7	▼1.0
SPD	✗ Anna Kassautzki	26,883	14.6	▼9.8	19,150	10.3	▼14.7
Left	Hennis Herbst	24,635	13.3	▼0.4	23,214	12.5	▲1.2
BSW					18,772	10.1	New
Greens	Claudia Müller	9,064	4.9	▼2.4	11,466	6.2	▼2.6
Tierschutzpartei	Robert Gabel	6,200	3.4	▲0.2	3,844	2.1	▼1.0
FW	Holger Gutzmann	4,979	2.7	▲1.6	2,130	1.2	0.0
FDP	Niklas Wagner	4,814	2.6	▼4.0	6,204	3.4	▼5.0
Volt					1,372	0.7	▲0.5
BD					472	0.3	New
MLPD					134	0.1	0.0
Informal votes		1,784			1,356		
Total valid votes		184,652			185,080		
Turnout		186,436	78.6	▲8.6			
AfD gain from SPD	Majority	29,607	16.1	N/A			

=== 2021 election ===
Federal election (2021): Vorpommern-Rügen – Vorpommern-Greifswald I
Notes:	Blue background denotes the winner of the electorate vote. Pink background denotes a candidate elected from their party list. Yellow background denotes an electorate win by a list member, or other incumbent. A ✓ or ✗ denotes status of any incumbent, win or lose respectively.						
Party	Candidate	Votes	%	±%	Party votes	%	±%
SPD	Anna Kassautzki	40,429	24.3	▲12.7	41,583	25.1	▲12.9
CDU	Georg Günther	33,903	20.4	▼23.6	30,910	18.6	▼14.3
AfD	Leif-Erik Holm	33,025	19.9	▲0.7	31,303	18.9	▼0.8
Left	Kerstin Kassner	22,767	13.7	▼2.2	18,857	11.4	▼6.6
Greens	Claudia Müller	12,199	7.3	▲4.3	14,654	8.8	▲3.8
FDP	Sebastian Adler	11,005	6.6	▲3.5	13,776	8.3	▲1.4
Tierschutzpartei	Robert Gabel	5,083	3.1	▲1.8	5,169	3.1	▲1.1
dieBasis	Sylvio Schmeller	2,805	1.7		2,904	1.8	
FW	Heidelind Holthusen	1,835	1.1	▲0.2	1,975	1.2	▲0.5
PARTEI	Mark Peter Pistor	1,782	1.1		1,576	1.0	▼0.2
NPD					758	0.5	▼0.4
Pirates	Friedrich Smyra	1,094	0.7		797	0.5	
Team Todenhöfer					392	0.2	
Volt					354	0.2	
Humanists					295	0.2	
ÖDP					201	0.1	0.0
DKP					152	0.1	
MLPD	Karl-Heinz Schulze	226	0.1	▼0.1	123	0.1	▼0.1
Informal votes		2,769			3,143		
Total valid votes		166,153			165,779		
Turnout		168,922	70.1	▼0.3			
SPD gain from CDU	Majority	6,526	3.9				

=== 2017 election ===
Federal election (2017): Vorpommern-Rügen – Vorpommern-Greifswald I
Notes:	Blue background denotes the winner of the electorate vote. Pink background denotes a candidate elected from their party list. Yellow background denotes an electorate win by a list member, or other incumbent. A ✓ or ✗ denotes status of any incumbent, win or lose respectively.						
Party	Candidate	Votes	%	±%	Party votes	%	±%
CDU	✓ Angela Merkel	73,746	44.0	▼12.3	55,110	32.9	▼12.0
AfD	Leif-Erik Holm	32,173	19.2		32,881	19.6	▲13.1
Left	Kerstin Kassner	26,650	15.9	▼3.4	30,107	18.0	▼2.6
SPD	Sonja Steffen	19,515	11.6	▼2.4	20,405	12.2	▼2.4
FDP	Patrick Meinhardt	5,229	3.1	▲2.3	11,490	6.9	▲4.2
Greens	Claudia Müller	5,081	3.0	0.0	8,498	5.1	▲0.3
Tierschutzpartei	Robert Gabel	2,161	1.3		3,319	2.0	
PARTEI					1,867	1.1	
FW	Armin Pagel	1,576	0.9	▲0.2	1,232	0.7	▼0.2
NPD	Udo Pastörs	976	0.6	▼2.0	1,368	0.8	▼1.5
BGE					692	0.4	
MLPD	Karl-Heinz Schulze	407	0.2		249	0.1	0.0
ÖDP					194	0.1	
Independent	Georg Tschammer-Osten	148	0.1				
Informal votes		1,866			2,116		
Total valid votes		167,662			167,412		
Turnout		169,528	70.4	▲6.1			
CDU hold	Majority	41,573	24.8	▼12.1			

=== 2013 election ===
Federal election (2013): Vorpommern-Rügen – Vorpommern-Greifswald I
Notes:	Blue background denotes the winner of the electorate vote. Pink background denotes a candidate elected from their party list. Yellow background denotes an electorate win by a list member, or other incumbent. A ✓ or ✗ denotes status of any incumbent, win or lose respectively.						
Party	Candidate	Votes	%	±%	Party votes	%	±%
CDU	✓ Angela Merkel	87,142	56.2	▲9.8	69,683	45.0	▲8.5
Left	Kerstin Kassner	29,847	19.3	▼7.2	31,930	20.6	▼7.4
SPD	Sonja Steffen	21,688	14.0	▼1.4	22,630	14.6	▲1.7
AfD					10,159	6.6	
Greens	Claudia Müller	4,728	3.1	▼1.4	7,372	4.8	▼0.9
NPD	Michael Andrejewski	3,970	2.6	▼0.2	3,525	2.3	▼0.5
Pirates	Susanne Wiest	3,738	2.4		3,527	2.3	▼0.3
Independent	Michael Adomeit	1,390	0.9				
FDP	Gino Leonhard	1,227	0.8	▼4.8	4,067	2.6	▼8.5
FW	Jürgen Dettmann	1,205	0.8		1,466	0.9	
PRO					330	0.2	
MLPD					161	0.1	▼0.1
REP					126	0.1	▼0.1
Informal votes		2,467			2,426		
Total valid votes		154,935			154,976		
Turnout		157,402	64.3	▲3.4			
CDU hold	Majority	57,295	36.9	▲14.0			

=== 2009 election ===
Federal election (2009): Stralsund – Nordvorpommern – Rügen
Notes:	Blue background denotes the winner of the electorate vote. Pink background denotes a candidate elected from their party list. Yellow background denotes an electorate win by a list member, or other incumbent. A ✓ or ✗ denotes status of any incumbent, win or lose respectively.						
Party	Candidate	Votes	%	±%	Party votes	%	±%
CDU	✓ Angela Merkel	57,865	49.3	▲8.0	43,650	37.3	▲2.7
Left	Marianne Linke	30,935	26.4	▲2.6	33,522	28.6	▲4.5
SPD	Sonja Steffen	14,040	12.0	▼13.4	15,048	12.9	▼12.8
FDP	Gino Leonhard	5,668	4.8	▲1.9	13,087	11.2	▲3.7
Greens	Arnold von Bosse	3,735	3.2	▲1.2	5,349	4.6	▲1.4
NPD	Raimund Borrmann	3,262	2.8	▼0.7	3,434	2.9	▼0.7
Pirates					2,564	2.2	
Independent	Michael Harald Adomeit	1,322	1.1				
Independent	Maria Hilde Wilke	479	0.4				
REP					236	0.2	
MLPD					210	0.2	
Informal votes		2,063			2,269		
Total valid votes		117,306			117,100		
Turnout		119,369	59.8	▼9.8			
CDU hold	Majority	26,930	23.0	▲7.1			

=== 2005 election ===
Federal election (2005):Stralsund - Nordvorpommern - Rügen
Notes:	Blue background denotes the winner of the electorate vote. Pink background denotes a candidate elected from their party list. Yellow background denotes an electorate win by a list member, or other incumbent. A ✓ or ✗ denotes status of any incumbent, win or lose respectively.						
Party	Candidate	Votes	%	±%	Party votes	%	±%
CDU	✓ Angela Merkel	57,131	41.3	▼0.3	47,783	34.6	▼1.7
SPD	Peter van Slooten	35,028	25.3	▼9.5	35,478	25.7	▼10.5
Left	Marianne Linke	32,850	23.8	▲7.7	33,294	24.1	▲7.8
NPD	Dirk Arendt	4,787	3.5		5,033	3.6	▲2.8
FDP	Nico Völker	4,078	2.9	▼1.0	10,351	7.5	▲2.2
Greens	René Gögge	2,734	2.0	0.0	4,404	3.2	▲0.2
Independent	Michael Adomeit	1,692	1.2				
GRAUEN					1,016	0.7	
MLPD					454	0.3	
PBC					384	0.3	
Informal votes		3,056			3,159		
Total valid votes		138,300			138,197		
Turnout		141,356	69.4	▲1.5			
CDU hold	Majority	22,103	16				

Bundestag	Vacant Party list from Lower Saxony (1998-2005) Title last held by Ludwigshafen	Constituency represented by the chancellor 2005-2021	Succeeded by Potsdam – Potsdam-Mittelmark II – Teltow-Fläming II
