= Georg Günther =

German politician (born 1988)

Member of the Bundestag for Mecklenburg-Vorpommern
- Incumbent
- Assumed office 2025

Personal details
- Born: 14 May 1988 (age 37) Greifswald, Germany (East Germany)
- Party: Christian Democratic Union

Georg Günther (born 14 May 1988) is a German politician from the Christian Democratic Union of Germany (CDU) and has been a member of the German Bundestag since 2025.

== Personal life ==
Günther grew up in Greifswald and Griebenow. He graduated from Grimmen High School in 2008 and then studied at the University of Applied Sciences for Public Administration, Police and Legal Services in Güstrow ; he completed the dual course of study with a degree in tax management . Günther worked for the tax office in Stralsund from 2008. He is married and has one child.

== Political career ==
Günther joined the Junge Union in 2007 and has been district chairman since 2011 and state chairman of the Junge Union Mecklenburg-Vorpommern since 2018.

In the 2021 German federal election, he came second with 20.4% of the first votes in the Vorpommern-Rügen – Vorpommern-Greifswald I constituency, behind Anna Kassautzki of the SPD.

In September 2024, the CDU constituency members' assembly again elected him as a direct candidate for the 2025 German federal election. He received 21.2% of the first votes and came second behind Dario Seifert of the AfD; he entered the 21st German Bundestag via his party's state list.
