= Stralsund – Nordvorpommern – Rügen (electoral district) =

1990–2013 electoral constituency in Germany

Stralsund – Nordvorpommern – Rügen in Mecklenburg-Vorpommern

Stralsund – Nordvorpommern – Rügen was an electoral constituency (German: Wahlkreis) represented in the German Bundestag from 1990 to 2013. Part of the state of Mecklenburg-Vorpommern, the constituency elected one representative under the mixed member proportional representation (MMP) system. Under the current constituency numbering system, it was designated as constituency 15. The constituency was abolished as part of the 2012 federal boundary review, which saw the state of Mecklenburg-Vorpommern lose one of its 7 geographic constituencies as a result of population change. It was largely replaced with the Vorpommern-Rügen – Vorpommern-Greifswald I constituency, which took its district number of 15.

== Members of the Bundestag ==
The constituency has been held since its creation in 1990 by the CDU's Angela Merkel, Federal Chancellor since 2005. In the 2009 federal election, Merkel won the seat by 23 percentage points over her nearest opponent.

Election	Member	Party
1990	Angela Merkel	CDU

== Election results ==
=== 2009 election ===
The following table does not list parties which did not contest or gain constituency votes.

Federal election 2009: Stralsund – Nordvorpommern – Rügen
Notes:	Blue background denotes the winner of the electorate vote. Pink background denotes a candidate elected from their party list. Yellow background denotes an electorate win by a list member, or other incumbent. A ✓ or ✗ denotes status of any incumbent, win or lose respectively.						
Party	Candidate	Votes	%	±%	Party votes	%	±%
CDU	✓ Angela Merkel	57,865	49.3	+8.0	43,650	37.3	+2.7
Left	Marianne Linke	30,935	26.4	+2.6	33,522	28.6	+4.5
SPD	Sonja Steffen	14,040	12.0	−13.4	15,048	12.9	−12.8
FDP	Gino Leonhard	5,668	4.8	+1.9	13,087	11.2	+3.7
Greens	Arnold von Bosse	3,735	3.2	+1.2	5,349	4.6	+1.4
NPD	Raimund Borrmann	3,262	2.8	−0.7	3,434	2.9	−0.7
Independent	Michael Adomeit	1,322	1.1	−0.1			
Independent	Maria Wilke	479	0.4	N/A			
Informal votes		2,063			2,269		
Total valid votes		117,306			117,100		
Turnout		119,369	59.8	−9.6			
CDU hold	Majority	26,930	22.9				
