= Sebastian Everding =

German politician and entrepreneur (born 1983)

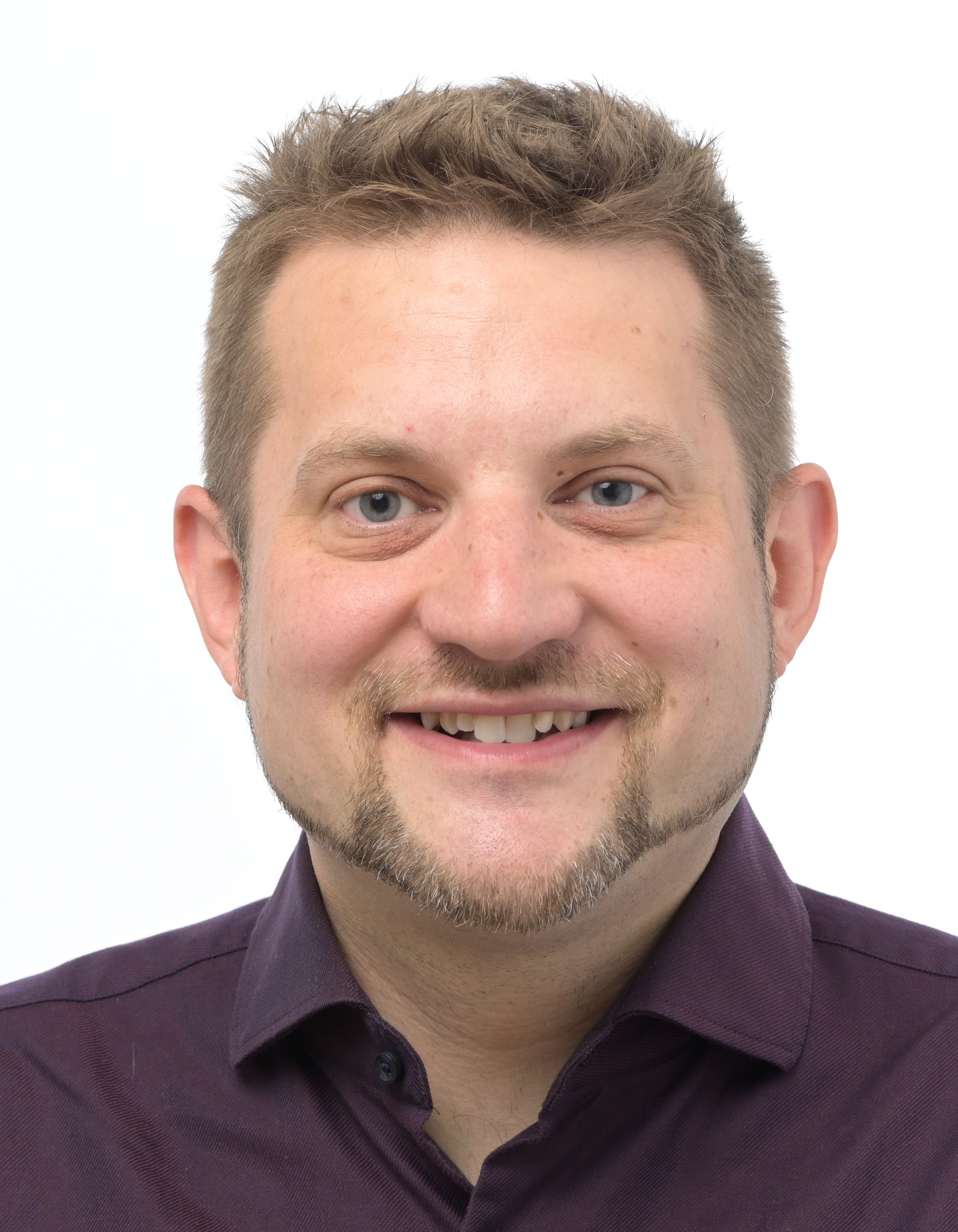
- Everding in 2024

Member of the European Parliament for Germany
- In office 16 July 2024 – 12 September 2026
- Preceded by: Martin Buschmann
- Succeeded by: Robert Gabel

Personal details
- Born: 1983 (age 42–43)
- Party: Tierschutzpartei

Sebastian Eike Everding (born 1983) is a German politician and entrepreneur who is a member of the European Parliament for the Tierschutzpartei (Animal Protection Party), having been elected in the 2024 European Parliament election in Germany.

Everding joined the Animal Protection Party in 2020, campaigning for local elections in Dortmund. Since 2022, he has been one of two chairmen of the party's branch in North Rhine-Westphalia alongside Angelika Remiszewski.

== See also ==
- Members of the European Parliament (2024–2029)
