= Anna Kassautzki =

German politician

- Kassautzki in 2021

Member of the Bundestag; for Vorpommern-Rügen – Vorpommern-Greifswald I
- In office 26 September 2021 – 25 March 2025
- Preceded by: Angela Merkel
- Succeeded by: Dario Seifert

Personal details
- Born: 25 December 1993 (age 32) Heidelberg, Germany
- Party: Social Democratic
- Education: University of Passau; University of Greifswald
- Occupation: Politician, Student

Anna Katharina Kassautzki (born 25 December 1993) is a German politician of the Social Democratic Party (SPD) who has been a member of the German Bundestag between 2021 and 2025, representing the Vorpommern-Rügen – Vorpommern-Greifswald I constituency.

== Political career ==
Kassautzki joined the SPD in 2014.

In the 2021 German federal election, Kassautzki won the Vorpommern-Rügen – Vorpommern-Greifswald I constituency in Mecklenburg-Western Pomerania. This was significant as it was the seat that the former Chancellor, Angela Merkel, had held for the CDU for the previous 30 years, before Kassautzki was born. In parliament, she has since been on the Committee on Digitization and the Committee on Agriculture.

Within her parliamentary group, Kassautzki belongs to the Parliamentary Left, a left-wing movement.

== Other activities ==
- Foundation for Data Protection, Member of the advisory board (since 2022)
- Magnus Hirschfeld Foundation, Alternate Member of the Board of Trustees (since 2022)
- Federal Network Agency for Electricity, Gas, Telecommunications, Post and Railway (BNetzA), Alternate Member of the advisory board (since 2022)
- German United Services Trade Union (ver.di), member (since 2016)
- Willy Brandt Center Jerusalem, Member
