= Claudia Müller (politician) =

German politician (born 1981)

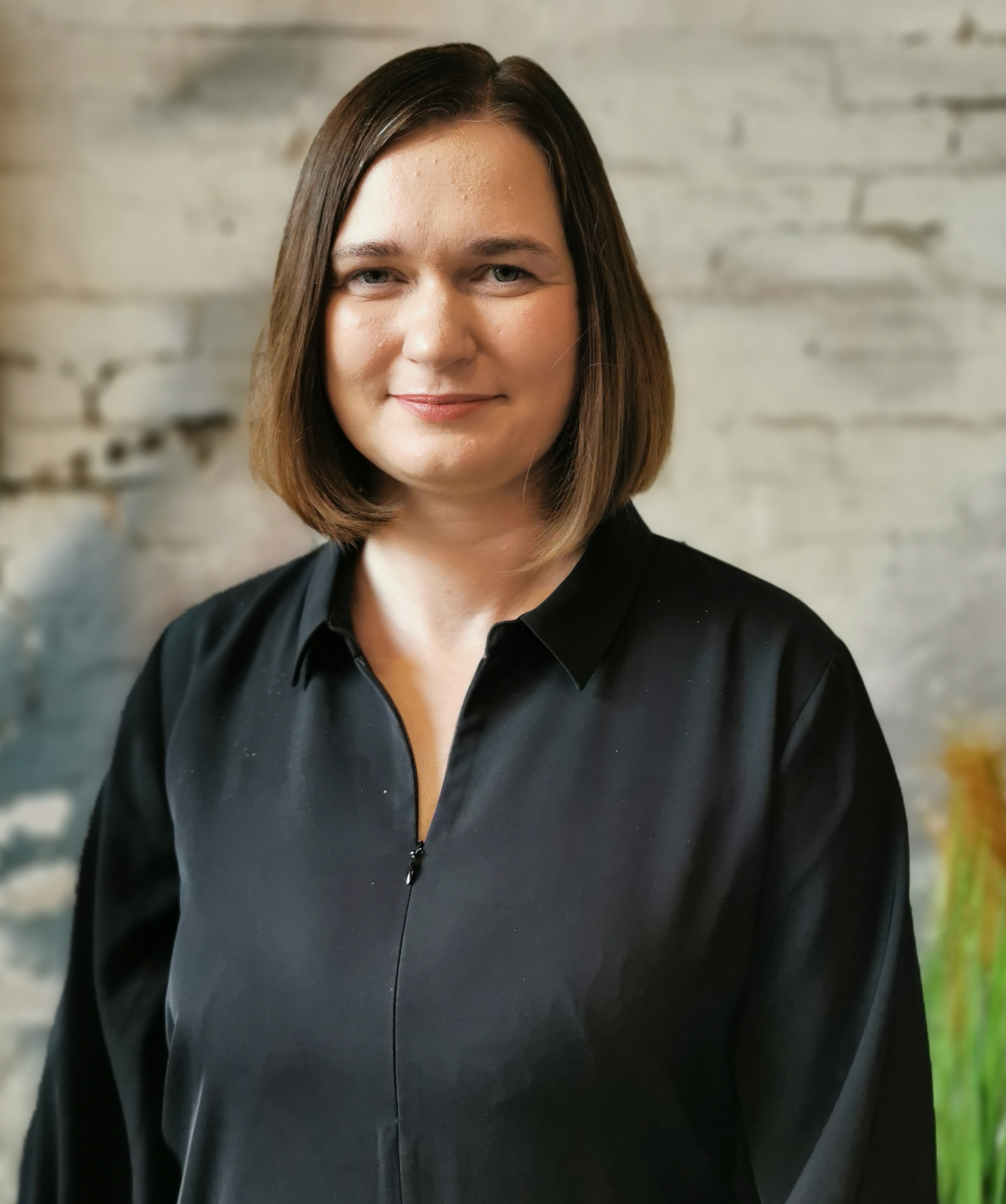
- Claudia Müller (2022)

Leader of Alliance 90/The Greens in Mecklenburg-Vorpommern
- In office 14 October 2012 – 24 February 2018
- Preceded by: Kerstin Felgner; Andreas Katz
- Succeeded by: Claudia Schulz; Ulrike Berger

Member of the Bundestag for Mecklenburg-Vorpommern
- Incumbent
- Assumed office 24 October 2017
- Constituency: Alliance 90/The Greens List

Personal details
- Born: 10 August 1981 (age 45) Rostock, East Germany (now Germany)
- Party: Greens
- Children: 2

Claudia Müller (born 10 August 1981) is a German politician of the Alliance 90/The Greens who has been serving as a member of the Bundestag from the state of Mecklenburg-Vorpommern since 2017.

In addition to her parliamentary work, Müller served as Parliamentary State Secretary in the Federal Ministry of Food and Agriculture in the coalition government of Chancellor Olaf Scholz from 2022 to 2025. In 2022, she was briefly the Coordinator for the Maritime Industry and Tourism at the Federal Ministry for Economic Affairs and Climate Action.

== Early life and education ==
Müller took her Abitur at the Gymnasium am Goetheplatz in Rostock in 2002. In 1998/99 she spent a year as an exchange student in the USA. From 2002 to 2012 she studied Management Studies at the University of Applied Sciences Stralsund.

== Early career ==
Since 2000 Müller has been working as a freelance tour guide and since 2008 as a media educational project developer for Identity Films Medienwerkstatt.

== Political career ==
=== Career in state politics ===
From February 2012 to May 2014, Müller chaired the Green Party's parliamentary group in the Vorpommern-Rügen regional parliament.

=== Member of the German Parliament, 2017–present ===
Müller became a member of the Bundestag in the 2017 German federal election, representing the Vorpommern-Rügen – Vorpommern-Greifswald I district. In parliament, she initially was a member of the Committee on European Affairs and the Committee on Economic Affairs and Energy. She also served as her parliamentary group's representative for small and medium-sized enterprises and spokesperson for maritime economy.

In addition to her committee assignments, Müller co-chairs the Parliamentary Friendship Group for Relations with the Baltic States and the Parliamentary Friendship Groups for Relations with the Nordic countries.

In the negotiations to form a so-called traffic light coalition of the Social Democratic Party (SPD), the Green Party and the Free Democratic Party (FDP) following the 2021 federal elections, Müller was part of her party's delegation in the working group on economic affairs, co-chaired by Carsten Schneider, Cem Özdemir and Michael Theurer.

In July 2022, Müller announced her intention to become her party's candidate to become mayor of Rostock; in the election, she only came in fourth with a total result of 8.6 percent of the votes.

Since the 2025 German federal election, Müller has been serving as deputy chair of the Green Party's parliamentary group, under the leadership of co-chairs Katharina Dröge and Britta Haßelmann.
