= Martin Buschmann =

German politician (born 1970)

Martin Buschmann MEP
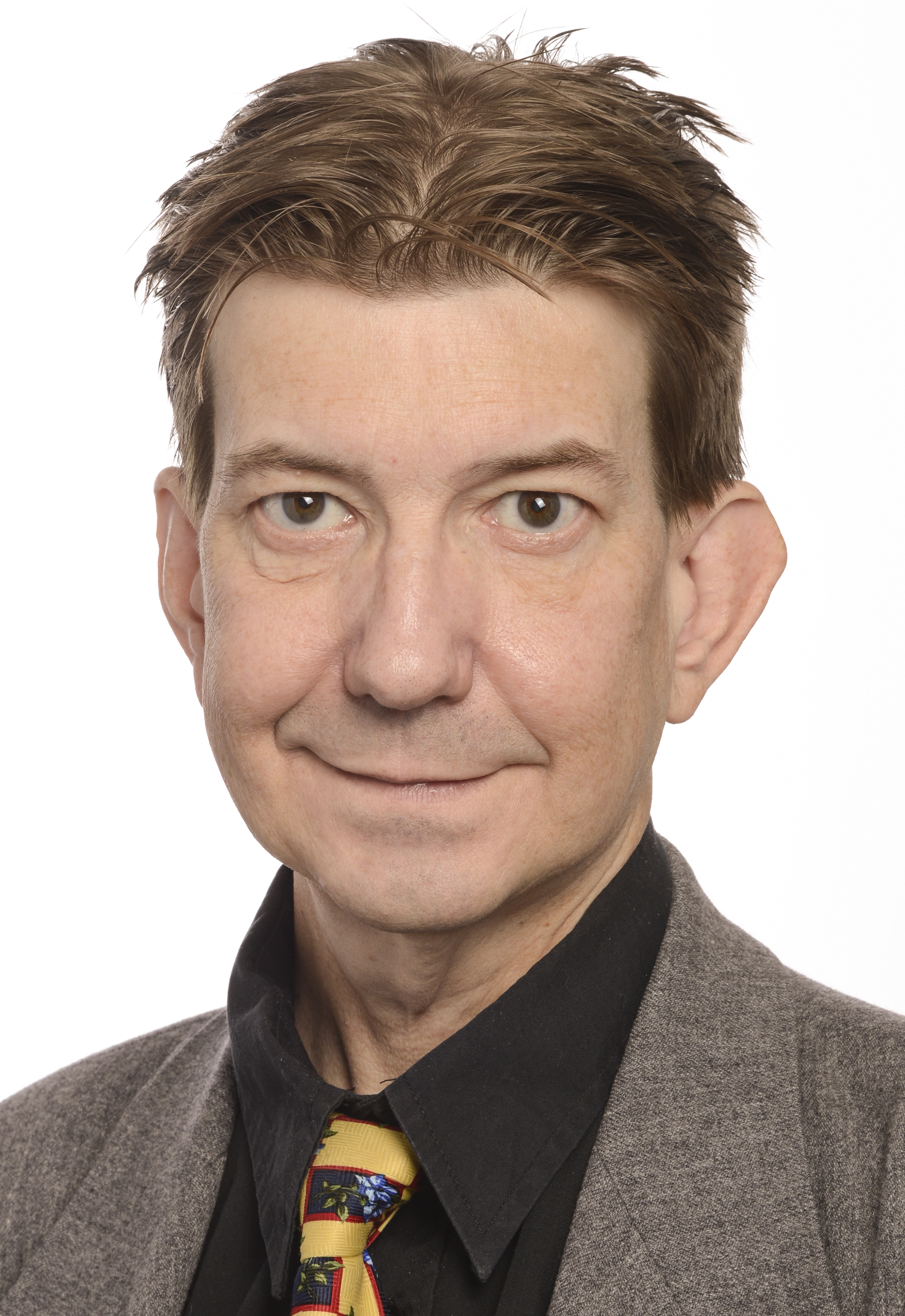

Member of the European Parliament for Germany
- In office 26 May 2019 – July 2024

Personal details
- Born: 17 April 1970 (age 55) Hamburg, West Germany
- Party: Human Environment Animal Protection Party (2009–2020); National Democratic Party of Germany (1992–1996)

Martin Kenny Buschmann (17 April 1970 in Hamburg) is a German politician of the Tierschutzpartei (Animal Protection Party). He has been a member of the European Parliament since the 2019 European elections. He was a member of the GUE/NGL parliamentary group from July 2019 to his resignation from the group in January 2020.

== Background ==
Buschmann was born in Hamburg, but grew up in the Hamburg suburb of Neu Wulmstorf. After graduating from high school in Neu Wulmstorf, he trained as a foreign trade merchant. He then worked for various shipping companies and in supply chain management.

== Political career ==
From 1992 to 1996 Buschmann was a member of the NPD, he was chairman of the NPD district association Harburg-Land and treasurer of the Lower Saxony chapter of the Young Nationalists, the party's youth organization.

In 2009 he joined the Tierschutzpartei. According to his own statements, he got involved with the party through actions against the animal testing laboratory in his neighbouring village Mienenbüttel. Among other things, he advocates a vegan lifestyle and a ban on factory farming. Since 2015, Buschmann has worked full-time for his party, including as secretary general.

For the 2019 European elections his party nominated him for first place on the list. The party won 1.4 percent, one of the 96 German mandates, so that Buschmann was awarded a seat in parliament.

=== Membership of the European Parliament ===
Buschmann joined the European United Left–Nordic Green Left (GUE/NGL) in the European Parliament after the European elections. This group includes the German party The Left. On behalf of the group, Mr Buschmann was a member of the Committee on Agriculture and Rural Development and the Committee on Petitions. On 26 January 2020, Buschmann's NPD past was revealed. Thereupon he distanced himself from the NPD's objectives in a statement and left the GUE/NGL group. The leadership of his party spoke in a statement of 29 January 2020 of a "serious breach of trust" and "massive damage to reputation". They called on Buschmann to resign his mandate. In this case, Robert Gabel, who had been second on the list of the Tierschutzpartei, would move to the European Parliament.

== Private life ==
Buschmann is married and lives in Neu Wulmstorf.
