= Willy Brandt Center Jerusalem =

Youth center in Jerusalem

- Abbreviation: WBC
- Formation: 1996
- Type: Youth organisation
- Headquarters: 22, Ein Rogel Street
- Location: Jerusalem
- Website: willybrandtcenter.org

The Willy Brandt Centre, Jerusalem (WBC) is a centre intended to allow encounters between German, Israeli and Palestinian Youth.

== Foundation ==
The vision for founding the WBC was developed in an agreement signed between the German Jusos, the Palestinian Shabeebat Fateh, and the Israeli Young Guard of the Labor Party in 1996.

The three youth organisations agreed in this document to found a centre in Jerusalem. This centre should enable equal encounters between German, Israeli, and Palestinian youth and young adults. Following three years of intense work in Jerusalem and in spite of the Second Intifada, the vision became reality in October 2003.

Since then, a team consisting of ten young Germans, Palestinians and Israelis takes part in the work of the WBC. The Willy Brandt Center is located in Jerusalem on the Green Line in Abu Tor/Al Thouri.

== History ==
After month of preparation and hours of negotiations between the Israeli, the Palestinian and the German delegation, the breaking moment arrived on April 9, 1996 in Ramallah: The Jusos (German Young Socialists), the youth organization of the Israeli Labor party (Mishmeret Tse’irah), and the Palestinian Fateh Youth (Shabibet Fateh) signed the article of agreement on the foundation of the Willy-Brandt-Center (WBC). Purpose of the contract was the creation of a center for encounter and communication on the border between East and West Jerusalem.

The opening ceremony for the Willy Brandt-Center for encounter and communication took part on the 11th anniversary of the death of Willy Brandt. The WBC is situated in the Jerusalem neighborhood of Abu Tor / Al Thouri exactly on the Green Line – the former "no-man's-land" that was separating the Jordanian East Jerusalem from the Israeli West Jerusalem.

== Aims ==
The German umbrella organizations are the Support Association of the Willy Brandt Center and the forum Civil Peace Service, on whose idea the aims of the Center are based. The aims are:

- To strengthen trust and solidarity between young political activists. Together with them it aims to develop active forms of coexistence based on social and political justice.
- To support the development of sustainable communication that is both intercultural and non-violent.
- To develop an understanding for different historical narratives and realities the three sides live in and refer to.

== Current projects ==
As a centre for encounters and communication the centre hosts three main projects at the moment:

- The trilateral project with activists of party youth organizations which signed the agreement in 1996, including the Young Meretz. All organizations are members of IUSY, the International Union of Socialist Youth.
- The joint bilateral project of the regional member organizations of the IFM-SEI, the International Falcon Movement – Socialist Education International.
- Events open for the public, such as Red Lounges, Political Cafés, Exhibitions, Workshops and Seminars taking place on a regular basis in the WBC

== Association ==
The Willy Brandt Center Jerusalem Association (Willy-Brandt-Zentrum e.V.) is an independent Non-Governmental-Organization and a non-profit incorporated society. It was founded in 1997 to put into reality the project that was established one year before. The Willy Brandt Center Association is based in Berlin and responsible body of the WBC in Jerusalem.

As member organization of the forum ZFD the Willy Brandt Center Association as well as the WBC in Jerusalem are receiving financial aid for their projects from the German Federal Ministry for Cooperation and Development.

Main tasks of the Willy Brandt Center Association is lobby work for the project in Germany, the application for financial support of projects, to serve as a communication platform and to arrange contacts between European, Israeli, and Palestinian partners and institutions. Additionally, the WBC supports educational journeys and trips of delegations.
