= Kerstin Kassner =

German politician (born 1958)

Kerstin Kassner MdB
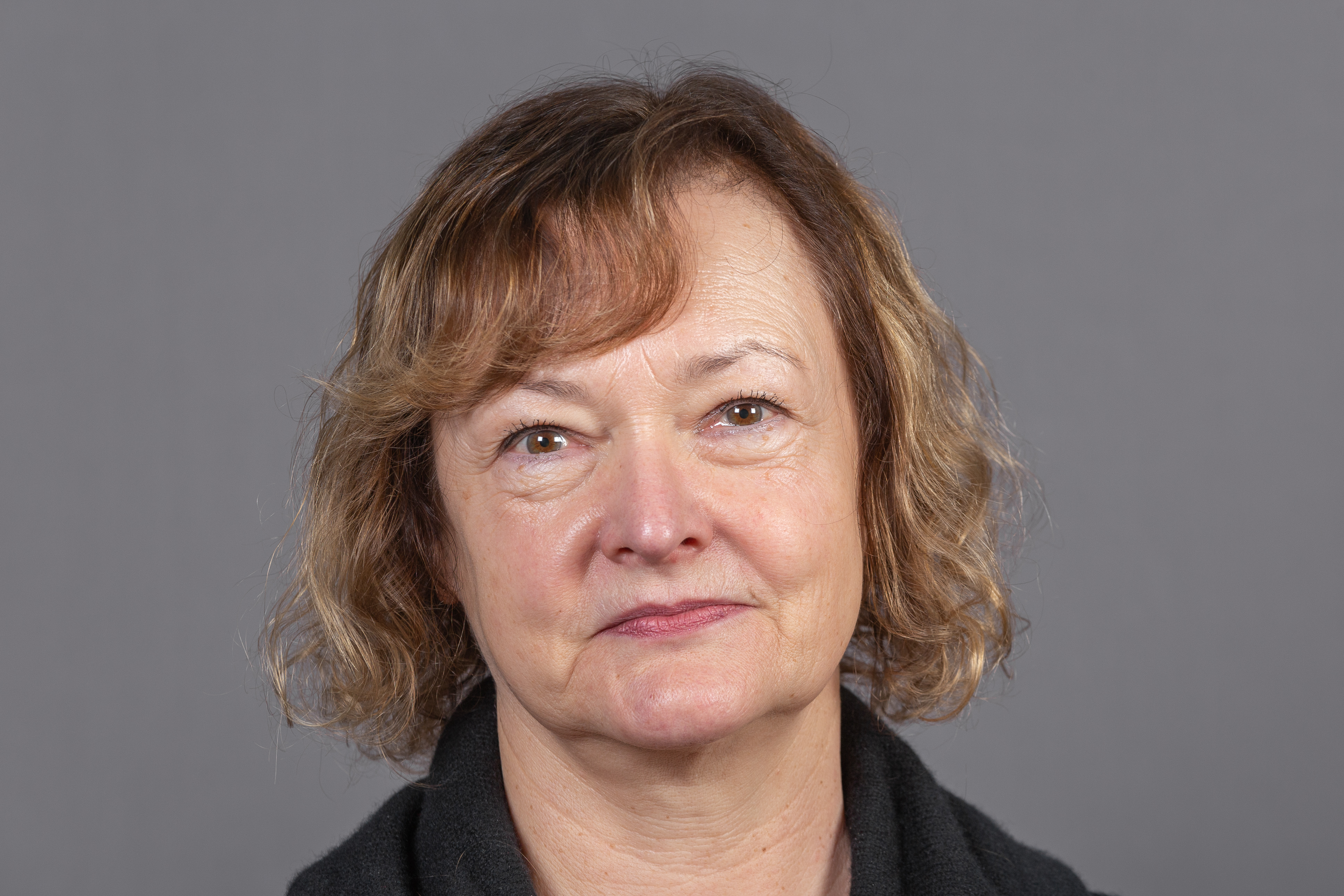
- Kerstin Kassner in 2020

District Administrator of Rügen
- In office 16 September 2001 – 4 September 2011
- Preceded by: Karin Timmel
- Succeeded by: Office abolished Ralf Drescher (as District Administrator of Vorpommern-Rügen)

Member of the Bundestag for Mecklenburg-Vorpommern
- Incumbent
- Assumed office 22 October 2013
- Constituency: The Left List

Member of the Landtag of Mecklenburg-Vorpommern
- In office 26 October 1990 – 13 November 2001
- Preceded by: Constituency established
- Succeeded by: Karin Schmidt
- Constituency: The Left List

Member of the Volkskammer for Rostock
- In office 5 April 1990 – 2 October 1990
- Preceded by: Constituency established
- Succeeded by: Constituency abolished

Personal details
- Born: 7 January 1958 (age 68) Radebeul, Bezirk Dresden, East Germany (now Germany)
- Party: The Left

Kerstin Kassner (born 7 January 1958) is a German politician. Born in Radebeul in the Bezirk Dresden of East Germany, she represents The Left. Kerstin Kassner has served as a member of the Bundestag from the state of Mecklenburg-Vorpommern since 2013.

== Life ==
Kerstin Kassner grew up on the island of Rügen and learned the profession of a waitress after finishing school. In 1981 she became restaurant manager at the FDGB holiday service in Binz. She completed a distance learning course, which she began at the Leipzig Graduate School of Management during this time, as a graduate economist in the hotel and restaurant industry. Afterwards she continued to work in various positions for the FDGB-Feriendienst and managed a hotel until 1991. After completing her holiday service, she became self-employed and ran her own pension at Putgarten from 1992 to 2018. From 2001 till 2011 she was District Administrator of the Rügen district in the federal state of Mecklenburg-Western Pomerania. She became member of the bundestag after the 2013 German federal election. She is a member of the Committee on Tourism and the Committee on Petitions. In her parliamentary group, Kassner is parliamentary manager. She is spokesperson for tourism policy and local politics.
