= Dario Seifert =

German politician (born 1994)

Dario Seifert MdB

Member of the Bundestag; for Vorpommern-Rügen – Vorpommern-Greifswald I
- Incumbent
- Assumed office 25 March 2025
- Preceded by: Anna Kassautzki

Personal details
- Born: 2 April 1994 (age 32) Recklinghausen, West Germany
- Party: Alternative for Germany
- Other political affiliations: Junge Nationalisten (2012–2014)
- Children: 1

Dario Seifert (born 2 April 1994) is a German politician who was elected as a member of the Bundestag in 2025.

From 2012 to 2014, he was a member of the neo-Nazi Junge Nationalisten, The youth wing of the National Democratic Party of Germany (NPD).
