= Robert Gabel =

German politician (born 1979)

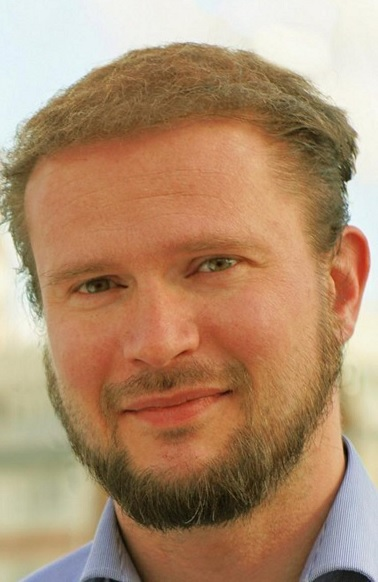
- Gabel in 2019

Member of the European Parliament
- Incumbent
- Assumed office 18 September 2026
- Preceded by: Sebastian Everding
- Constituency: Germany

Personal details
- Born: 14 October 1979 (age 47)
- Party: Partei Mensch Klima Tierschutz

Robert Gabel (born 14 October 1979) is a German politician serving as a member of the European Parliament since 2026. From 2017 to 2024, he served as co-chairman of the Partei Mensch Klima Tierschutz.
