= Sonja Steffen =

German lawyer and politician (born 1963)

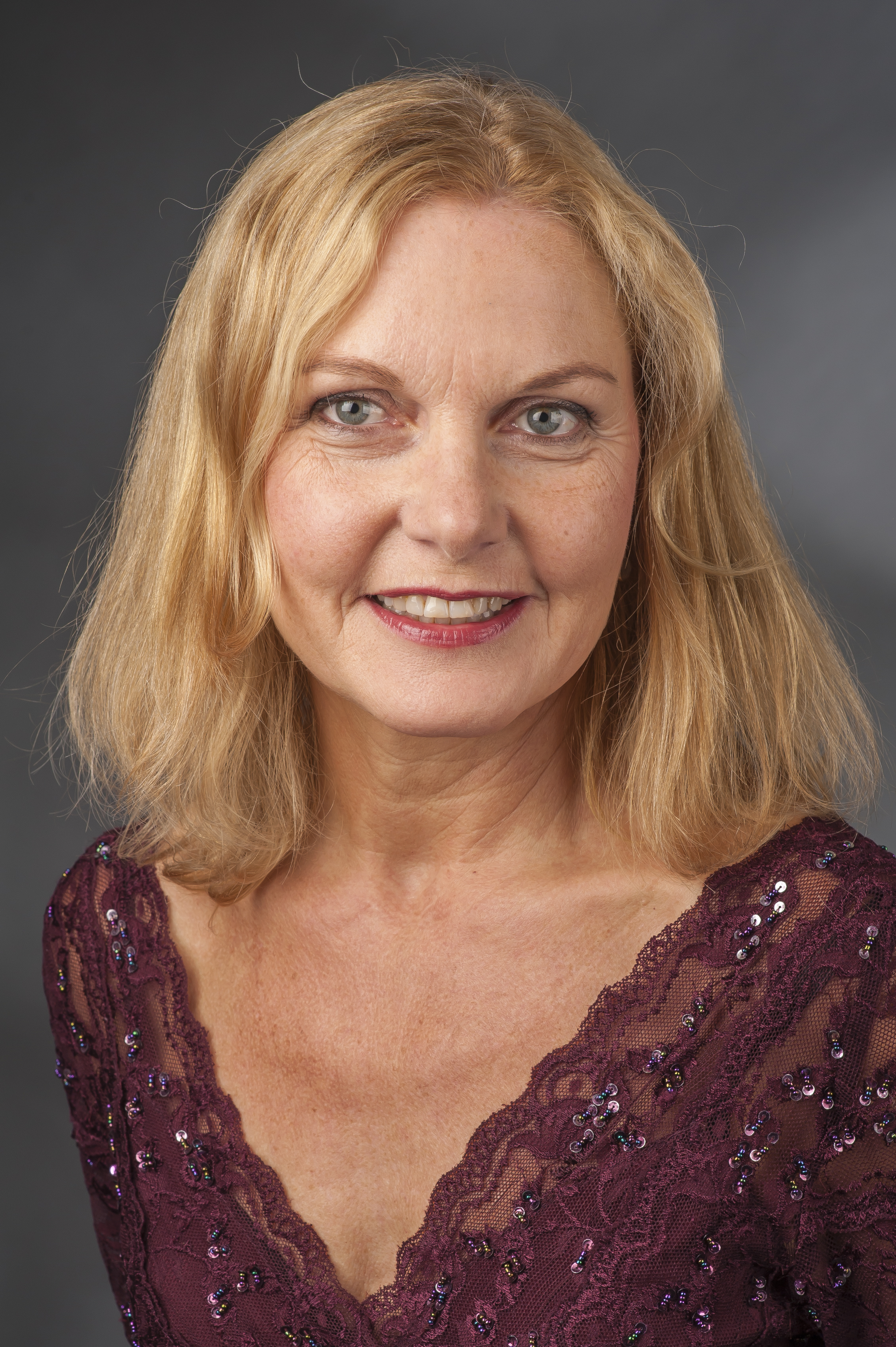
- Steffen in 2014

Member of the Bundestag
- In office 2009–2021

Personal details
- Born: 22 October 1963 (age 62) Dreiborn, West Germany (now Germany)
- Party: SPD
- Children: 3
- Education: University of Cologne

Sonja Amalie Steffen (born 22 October 1963) is a German lawyer and politician of the Social Democratic Party (SPD) who served as a member of the Bundestag from the state of Mecklenburg-Vorpommern from 2009 to 2021.

== Early life and education ==
Born in Dreiborn, North Rhine-Westphalia, Steffen studied law at the University of Cologne.

== Political career ==
Steffen became member of the Bundestag in the 2009 German federal election.

In parliament, Steffen was a member of the Committee on Legal Affairs and Consumer Protection; its Sub-Committee on European Affairs; the Committee on the Verification of Credentials and Immunities; and the Budget Committee. In her capacity as member of the Budget Committee, she served as her parliamentary group's rapporteur on the annual budgets of the Federal Ministry for Economic Cooperation and Development (since 2014) and the Federal Ministry of Health (since 2018).

In 2018, Steffen also joined the parliamentary body in charge of appointing judges to the Highest Courts of Justice, namely the Federal Court of Justice (BGH), the Federal Administrative Court (BVerwG), the Federal Fiscal Court (BFH), the Federal Labour Court (BAG), and the Federal Social Court (BSG).

In February 2020, Steffen announced that she would not stand in the 2021 federal elections but instead resign from active politics by the end of the parliamentary term.

== Later career ==
Since 2023, Steffen has been serving as ombudsperson for BDIU, the national association of Germany's credit management, debt collection and debt purchase sector.

== Other activities ==
- Magnus Hirschfeld Foundation, Alternate Member of the Board of Trustees
- German Corporation for International Cooperation (GIZ), Member of the Supervisory Board (since 2014)
- Ozeaneum, Member of the Supervisory Board
