= Maneli Mirkhan =

French-Iranian strategist and international consultant

- مانلی میرخان
- Born: 1981 (age 44–45)

Maneli Mirkhan (Persian: مانلی میرخان; born 1981) is a French-Iranian strategist and international consultant specializing in Iran and European policy. She is the founder of DORNA, an organization focused on structuring a democratic transition in Iran, and serves as a strategic consultant for European policy at United Against Nuclear Iran (UANI). She is also active in diaspora-led initiatives supporting Iranian civil society.

== Biography ==
Mirkhan was born in 1981 to a French-Iranian family. According to her, her parents belonged to the generation that had placed hope in the 1978–79 revolution but from whom, in her words, "the revolution was stolen". She completed a bachelor's degree in international economics and finance from the Sorbonne University and a master's degree in energy and environmental economics and policy at IFP School and the CEA (Nuclear Energy Center).

Mirkhan has more than 15 years of experience as a management and strategy consultant, with expertise spanning Europe and the Middle East and North Africa (MENA) region. Her professional background includes work in sectors such as oil and gas, nuclear energy, transportation, and automotive industries.

In 2023, she joined UANI as a strategic consultant for European policy. According to a UANI press release, she and Maryam Banihashemi "have worked in Iran and across Europe, with first-hand experience in dealing with the National Iranian Oil Company (NIOC) and Iran's automotive and power sectors", serving as strategic consultants for European policy and contributing to UANI's business risk unit. In this role she has provided analysis of European companies' exposure to sectors under the control of the Islamic Revolutionary Guard Corps (IRGC).

== DORNA ==
Mirkhan is the founder of DORNA, an independent organization focused on anticipating, structuring, and securing the conditions for political transition in Iran. It describes itself as an independent, non-partisan office providing frameworks for the liberation of Iran, enabling Iranians to shape their democratic political future. Mirkhan has argued that without a minimal common platform among opposition and domestic actors, a collapse of the regime could lead to power struggles and instability.

== Activism ==
=== Femme Azadi ===
Mirkhan was involved with the collective Femme Azadi ("Woman Freedom"), a France-based group formed after the death of Mahsa Amini. The group organized weekly demonstrations and political advocacy, including an open letter to French president Emmanuel Macron and campaigns to sponsor Iranian prisoners on death row. Speaking to ABC News during the 2022–2023 protests, she said "Our role as a diaspora is not to make the revolution, but to support the revolution".

=== House of Liberty ===
Mirkhan co-founded and serves as Secretary General of House of Liberty, a civil society NGO advocating for Iranian human rights, women's rights, and political reform. The organization was co-founded with Alireza Akhondi, an Iranian-born politician and member of parliament for Sweden's Centerpartiet. Through this role she has participated in international forums, including a European Parliament forum in Brussels on women's rights.

== Views and commentary ==
Mirkhan has been a frequent commentator in French and international media, including Le Figaro, RTL, BFM, Radio Classique and Atlantico. She has argued that Iran's nuclear position is central to the regime's identity, expressing doubt that negotiations would succeed. In a 31 January 2026 interview on RTL, Mirkhan argued that the crisis had reached a point from which there was no return and expressed the view that military intervention was the only remaining option.
