= 2017 Jamaica coalition exploratory talks =

The Jamaica coalition exploratory talks in October and November 2017 regarding the possibility of a black-yellow-green federal government in Germany (Jamaika-Koalition between the CDU/CSU (Union), FDP and Alliance 90/The Greens) began four weeks after the 2017 German federal election on 24 October 2017. Shortly before midnight on 19–20 November 2017, the FDP declared the talks to be a failure. This led to the continuation of the black-red grand coalition of the CDU/CSU and Social Democratic Party (SPD), which had been in place since 2013, with Angela Merkel's fourth cabinet.

== Starting point for negotiations ==
The five party leaders at the time

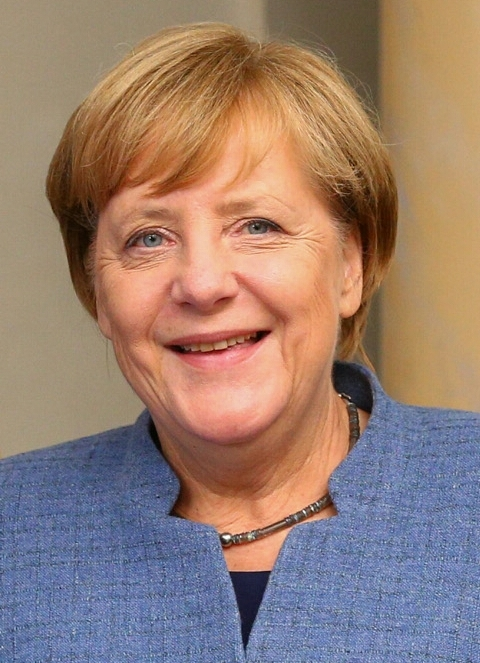
Angela Merkel (CDU)

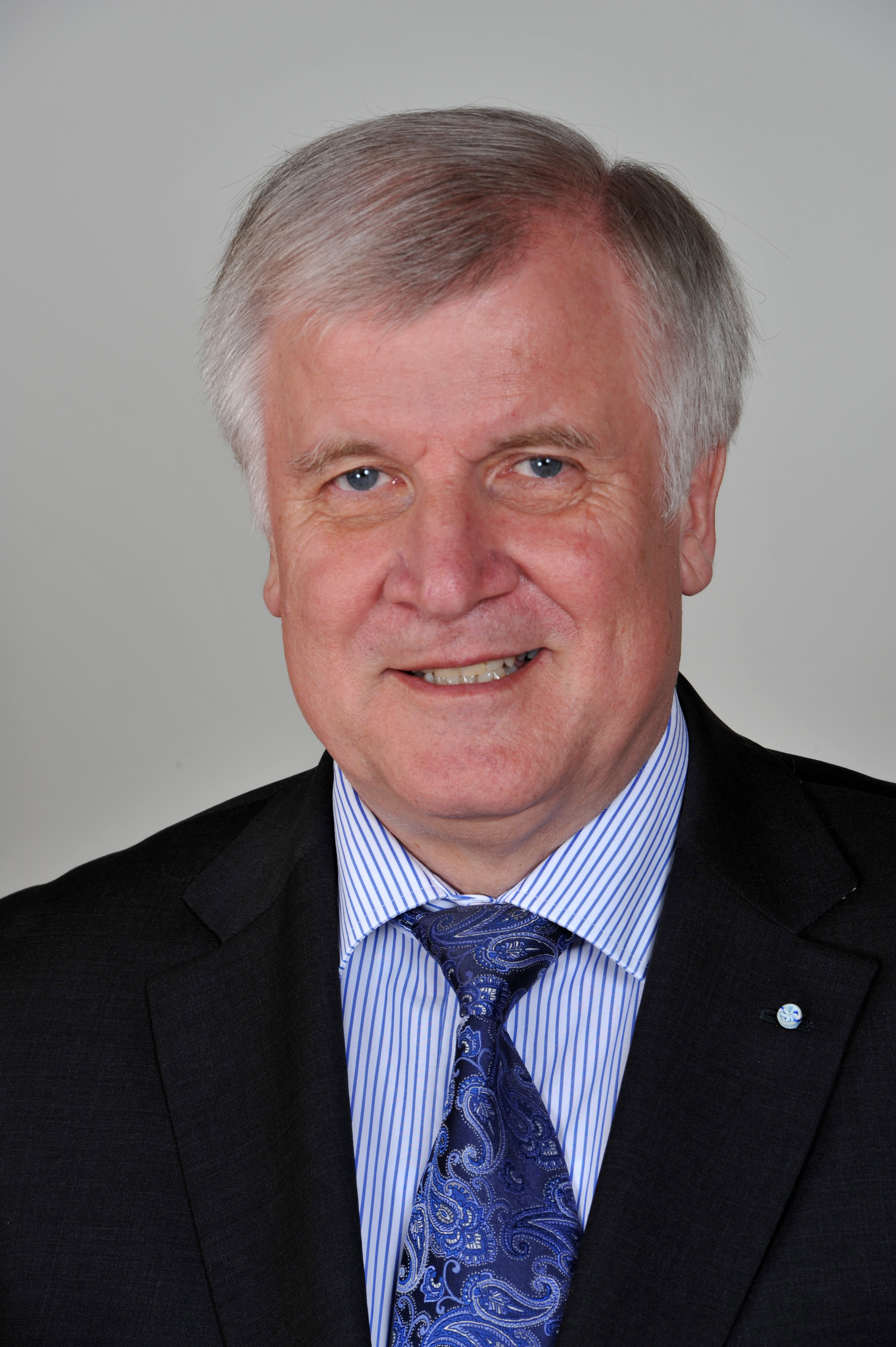
Horst Seehofer (CSU)

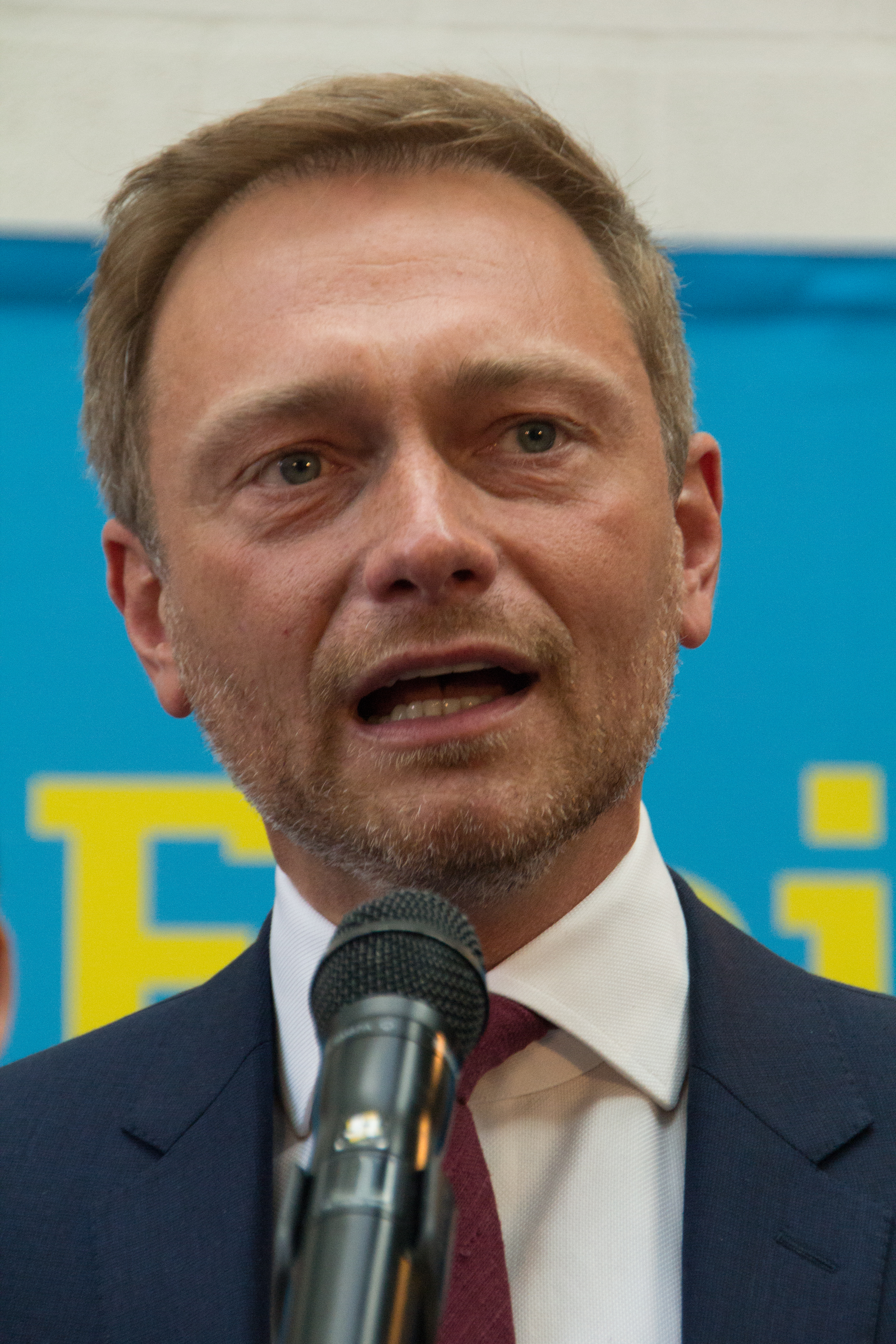
Christian Lindner (FDP)

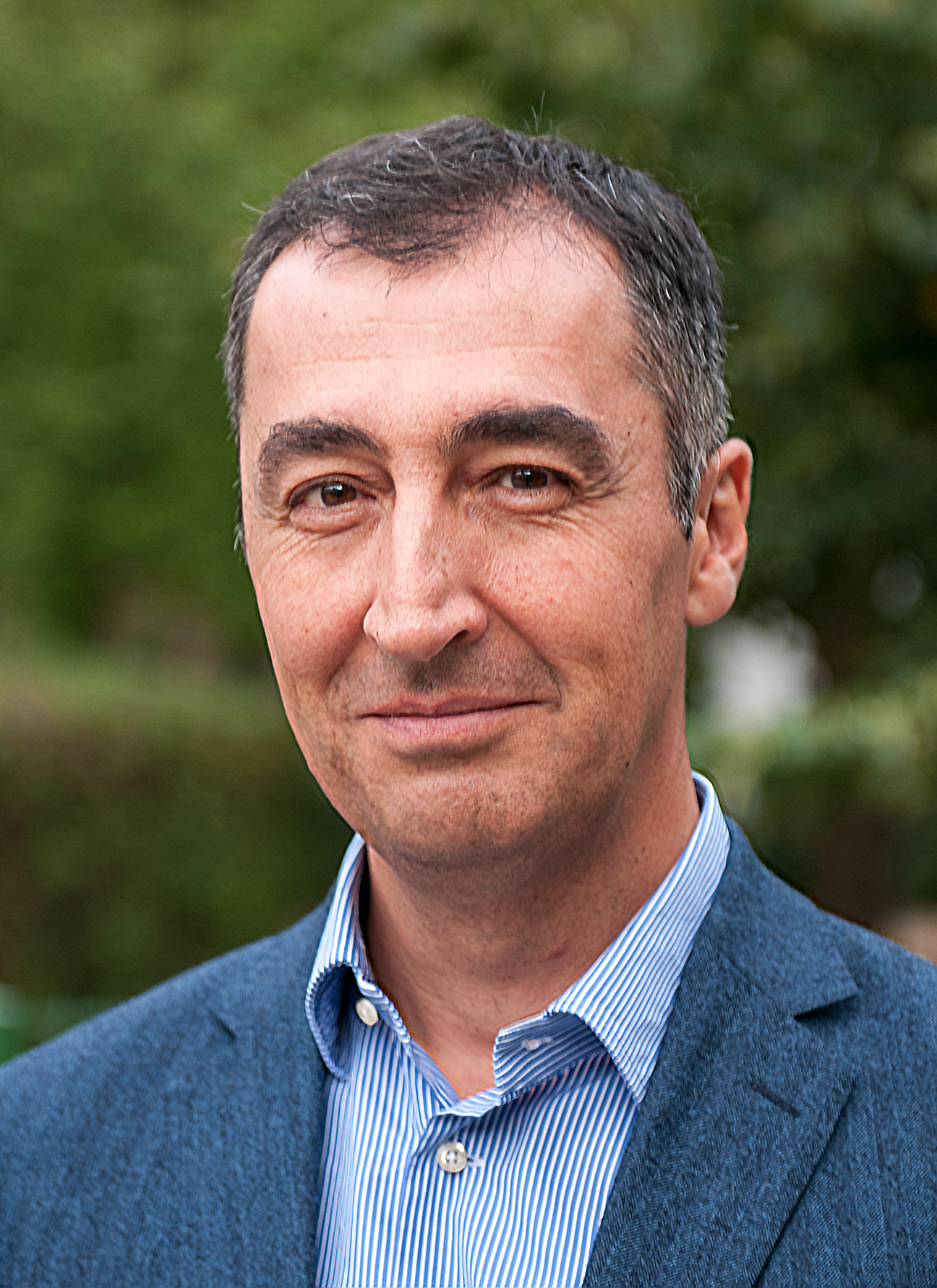
Cem Özdemir (Greens)

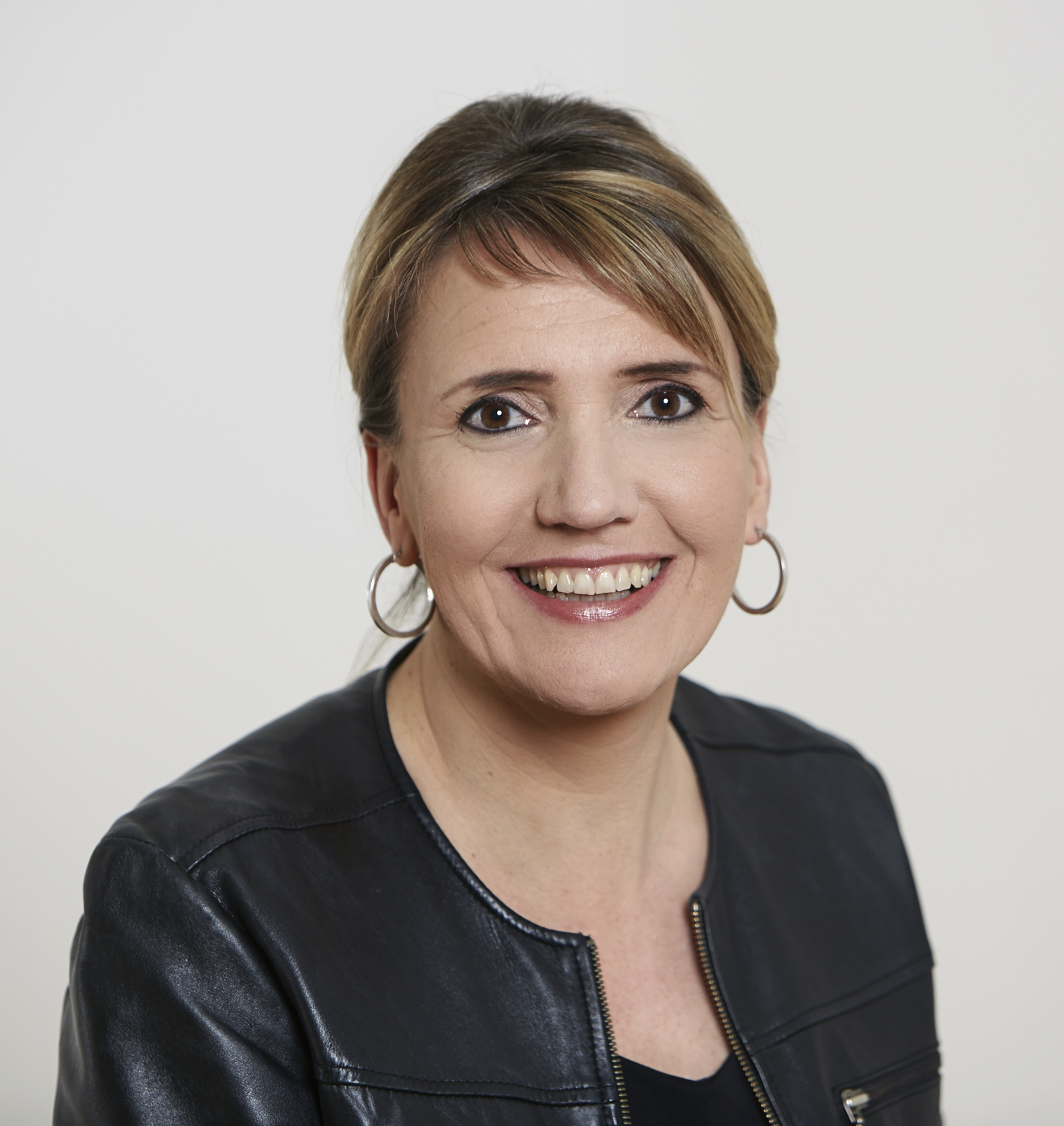
Simone Peter (Greens)

After the federal election, in addition to tolerating a minority government, a Jamaica coalition was a possible coalition for forming a government, after Martin Schulz had ruled out a grand coalition on election day due to heavy losses and announced that the SPD would form the largest opposition party.

However, at a meeting of the federal governments at the end of September, the Greens announced that they would only join this governing coalition if core projects of their ten-point plan, such as climate change mitigation, social cohesion, and social justice, became a political priority of the federal government. Exploratory groups were established within the negotiating parties. The beginning of the talks were postponed until the snap state election in Lower Saxony had concluded.

A black-green-yellow coalition at the federal level was also seen in the press as an alliance of the West German middle class and would have had a majority almost exclusively in the western part of the Federal Republic; without an emphasis on women's and social policy as well as compensation for rural areas, a migration of Green voters to the Left was expected, based on the experience of the Jamaica coalition in the city of Bonn, according to Katja Dörner, a participant in the exploratory talks.

== Negotiations ==
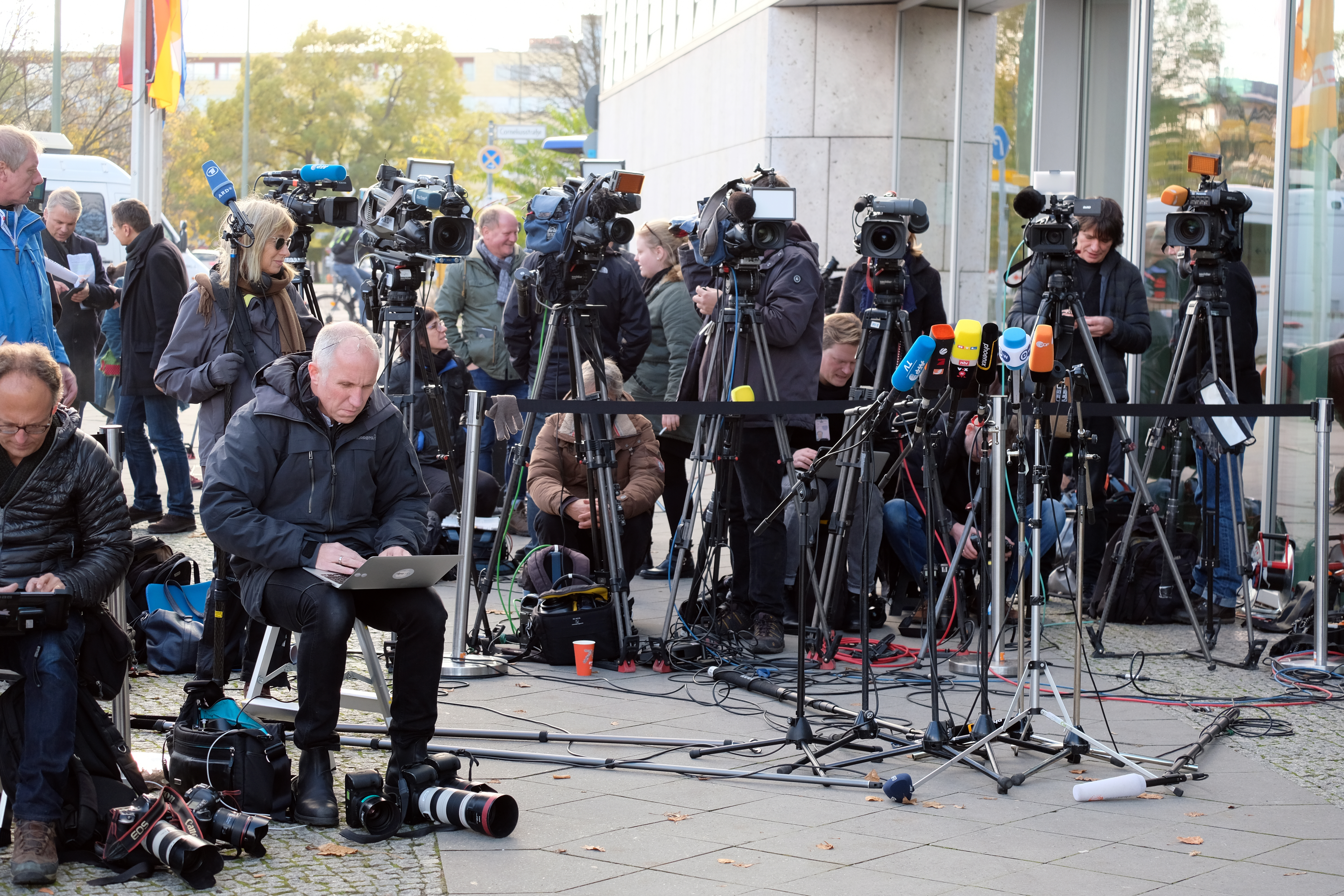
Press representatives waiting in front of the Konrad Adenauer House after the outcome of the exploratory talks, November 2017

According to reports, the negotiations between the CDU/CSU (Angela Merkel and Horst Seehofer), FDP (Christian Lindner) and Alliance 90/The Greens (Cem Özdemir and Katrin Göring-Eckardt), only began a few weeks after the 2017 federal election.

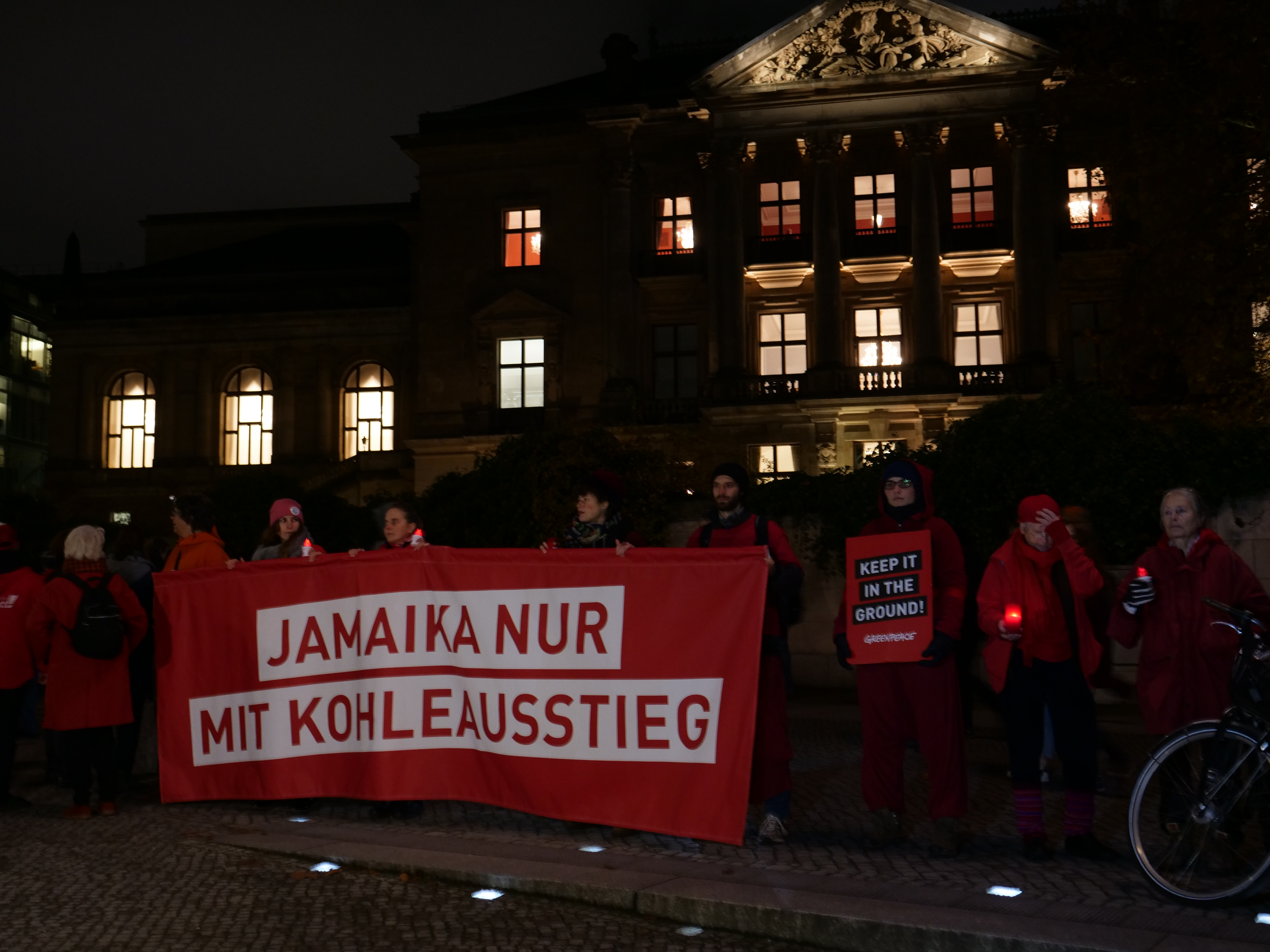
The building of the German Parliamentary Society in Berlin's government district during a protest rally at the time of the Jamaica coalition exploratory talks.

After three introductory meetings in pairs, 52 delegates met for the first time in a large group in Berlin on 20 October – dubbed the "Jamaica Quartet" by the media due to the participation of more than three parties . The secretariats of the four participating parties had pre-structured 12 thematic blocks for the working meeting at the German Parliamentary Society. Considerable controversy was observed between the CSU and the Greens, but according to polls, 83% of citizens surveyed expected that common ground would be sought and compromises reached.

Further exploratory talks were scheduled for 24, 26, and 30 October, as well as the first two days of November 2017. The contentious issues of the Jamaica coalition talks were taxes, the public budget, finance, climate policy, migration, transport policy, domestic policy, security policy, the rule of law, agricultural policy, and European policy. These talks took place at times in parallel with the COP23 World Climate Conference, which was being held in Bonn at the beginning of November, and were followed intensively by the media and civil society actions. An interim assessment of the exploratory talks was followed by a further round of negotiations that focused on very detailed content.

According to Georg Nüßlein (CSU), the deputy chairman of the CDU/CSU parliamentary group in the Bundestag responsible for environmental policy, the introduction of a national CO2 pricing system, championed by the FDP and the Greens and intended to be linked to the abolition or reduction of the electricity tax, failed due to resistance from the CDU/CSU.

=== Explanations for the termination of the exploratory talks ===
On the night of 19 November 2017, the Federal Chairman of the Free Democratic Party (FDP), Christian Lindner, stated, among other things: "It is better not to govern than to govern badly".

Chancellor Angela Merkel and CSU chairman Horst Seehofer then spoke. Angela Merkel stated that they had "experienced a lot" and that there had been "very different cultures of negotiating styles". She now "regretted" that “we could not find a common solution". In contrast, Seehofer stated that it was “a shame” that "the FDP had withdrawn and broken off the negotiations".

According to Lukas Köhler and Ingrid Nestle, one of the reasons for the breakdown was the disagreement over the extent of the reduction in coal-fired power generation: a reduction of "coal capacity" by only 5 GW, which the FDP could accept at the time, or by 7 GW, as already negotiated between the CDU/CSU and the Greens. The coalition agreement of 7 February 2018, between the CDU/CSU and the SPD does not specify a reduction target.

== Reactions ==
=== Federal President ===
Following the breakdown of exploratory talks, Federal President Frank-Walter Steinmeier cancelled his inaugural visit to North Rhine-Westphalia and, after a meeting at his official residence, Bellevue Palace, with acting chancellor Angela Merkel, reminded the political parties elected to the Bundestag of their responsibility to form a government; they were obligated to the common good: "I expect everyone to be willing to talk". The Federal Presidential Office subsequently announced that the Federal President would hold dialogues with the leaders of all parties "that could share sufficient programmatic common ground for forming a government". In addition to Angela Merkel (CDU), Christian Lindner (FDP), Cem Özdemir and Simone Peter (Grüne) and Horst Seehofer (CSU, the leaders of the remaining parliamentary groups in the Bundestag —the SPD, AfD, and Die Linke — were invited to the dialogue. Furthermore, Frank-Walter Steinmeier stated his intention to consult with the presidents of the four other permanent constitutional bodies of the Federal Government.

=== Federal states ===
Minister-President of Schleswig-Holstein Daniel Günther (CDU) expressed his disappointment, stating that the negotiations had brought them significantly closer to an agreement and that the crucial issues had already been resolved. He was therefore very surprised by the FDP's withdrawal. His cabinet colleague, the Green Party Environment Minister Robert Habeck, was also personally disappointed and even suspected tactical calculation on the part of the FDP behind the final day of negotiations.

=== Parties ===
CDU Deputy Chairwoman Julia Klöckner tweeted that she would have preferred "if all party leaders could have announced the breakdown of talks together". The Young Union in Düsseldorf demanded the immediate resignation of (then-acting) Chancellor Merkel. SPD Deputy Chairman Ralf Stegner reiterated that his party would not be available for another grand coalition. Green Party Managing Director Michael Kellner assumed that the failure of the exploratory talks could lead to new elections. The AfD politician Alice Weidel saw the breakdown of the exploratory talks as a success for her party: "We prevented a black-green coalition". Die Linke called for new elections; its chairwoman Katja Kipping stated that new elections were the democratically appropriate consequence and would show that "the Merkel system is not capable of securing a majority".

=== Outside Germany ===
President of the European Commission Jean-Claude Juncker, through a spokesperson, stated that he was confident that "the constitutional process in Germany [...] will ensure stability and continuity". President of Russia Vladimir Putin said that the Russian government was monitoring the government formation process and hoped for a swift and successful conclusion. French President Emmanuel Macron said that it was not in France's interest for the situation in Germany to be tense as Germany was playing a central role in Macron's plans for EU reform. Dutch Foreign Minister Halbe Zijlstra warned that "it is bad news for Europe that the government formation process will take a little longer".

== Reception ==
The exploratory talks and their conclusion were often summarized using an allegorical image related to the island of Jamaica: “Shortly before reaching the coast of Jamaica, perhaps even upon entering the harbor, the steamer with the sounding team on board capsized.”... “The journey to Jamaica – over, stranded on the reef ...” (Tagesspiegel). The failure of the talks was often referred to in the media simply as the end of the Jamaica talks.

At the end of 2017, the Society for the German Language chose the word "Jamaika-Aus" as the word of the year for 2017. The word "lindnern ", meaning "better not to do something at all than to do it badly", was a finalist for the Youth Word of the Year in 2018.

== Documentaries ==
- Stephan Lamby: Im Labyrinth der Macht – Protokoll einer Regierungsbildung, SWR, gesendet im Ersten am 7. März 2018
- Reinhold Beckmann, Ulrich Stein: Lindner und die FDP – Aufbruch ins Abseits? NDR, gesendet im Ersten am 29. Oktober 2018.
