= Boris Johnson as Foreign Secretary =

Foreign Office under Boris Johnson (2016–2018)

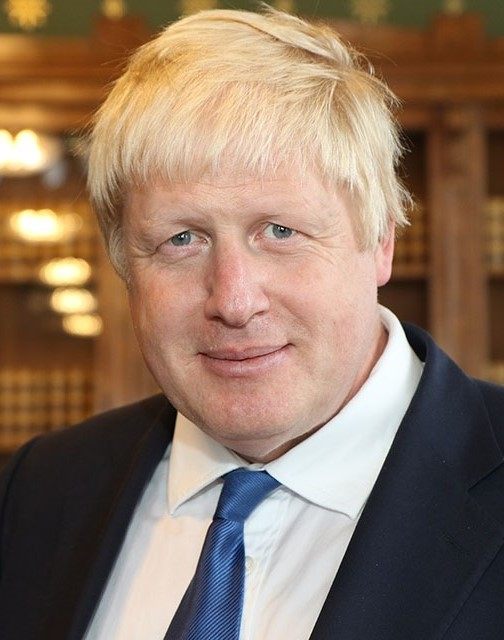
- Boris Johnson in his 2016 official portrait
- Boris Johnson's tenure as Foreign Secretary; 13 July 2016 – 9 July 2018
- Party: Conservative
- Nominated by: Theresa May
- Appointed by: Elizabeth II

Boris Johnson served as foreign secretary from 2016 until 2018. As a member of Theresa May's government, Johnson was appointed Foreign Secretary on 13 July 2016, shortly after May became prime minister following the resignation of David Cameron. Analysts saw the appointment as a tactic to weaken Johnson politically: the new positions of "Brexit secretary" and international trade secretary left the foreign secretary as a figurehead with few powers.

Johnson's appointment ensured he would often be out of the country and unable to organise and mobilise backbenchers against her, while forcing him to take responsibility for problems caused by withdrawing from the EU. He held the post until he resigned on 9 July 2018 in protest at the Chequers plan and May's approach to Brexit, and was succeeded by Jeremy Hunt. Notable events of his tenure included the response to the poisoning of Sergei and Yulia Skripal, the imprisonment of Nazanin Zaghari-Ratcliffe and support for the Saudi Arabian–led intervention in Yemen.

== Appointment ==
After Theresa May became leader of the Conservative and Prime Minister, Johnson was appointed as Foreign Secretary on 13 July 2016. Johnson's appointment was criticised by some journalists and foreign politicians due to his history of controversial statements about other countries and their leaders. Former Prime Minister of Sweden Carl Bildt said "I wish it was a joke", and French Foreign Minister Jean-Marc Ayrault stated: "I am not at all worried about Boris Johnson, but ... during the campaign he lied a lot to the British people and now it is he who has his back against the wall" as the UK tries to negotiate its future relationship with EU. Conversely, former Prime Minister of Australia Tony Abbott welcomed the appointment and called him "a friend of Australia". A senior official in the US government suggested that Johnson's appointment would push the US further towards ties with Germany at the expense of the Special Relationship with the UK.

Several analysts described the appointment as a possible tactic by May to weaken Johnson politically: the new positions of "Brexit Secretary" and International Trade Secretary leave the Foreign Secretary as a figurehead with few powers, and the appointment would ensure that Johnson would often be out of the country and unable to organise a rebel coalition, while also forcing him to take responsibility for any problems caused by withdrawing from the EU.

== Tenure ==
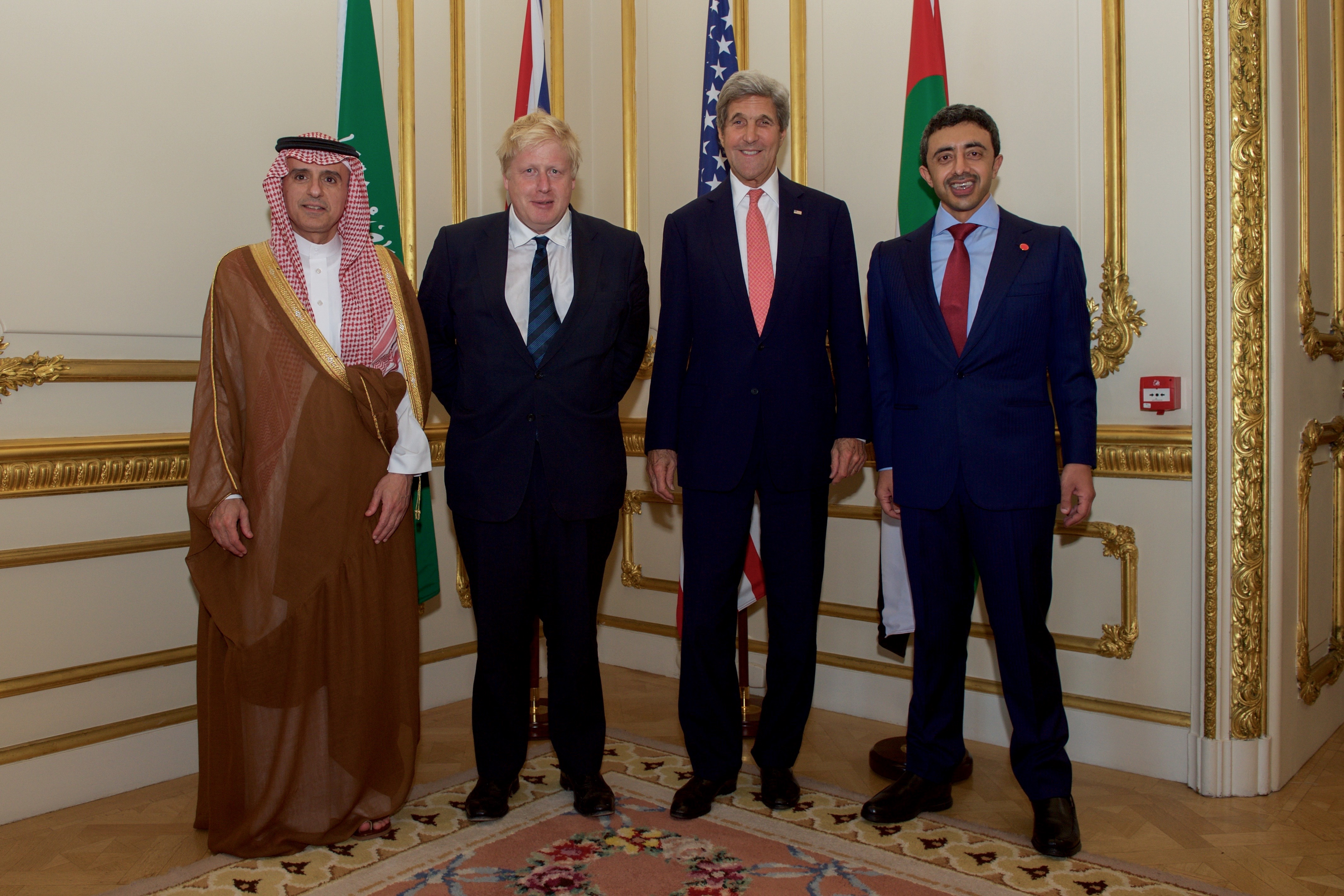
Johnson with US Secretary of State John Kerry, Saudi Arabia's Foreign Minister Adel al-Jubeir and the UAE's Foreign Minister Abdullah bin Zayed Al Nahyan in London, 19 July 2016

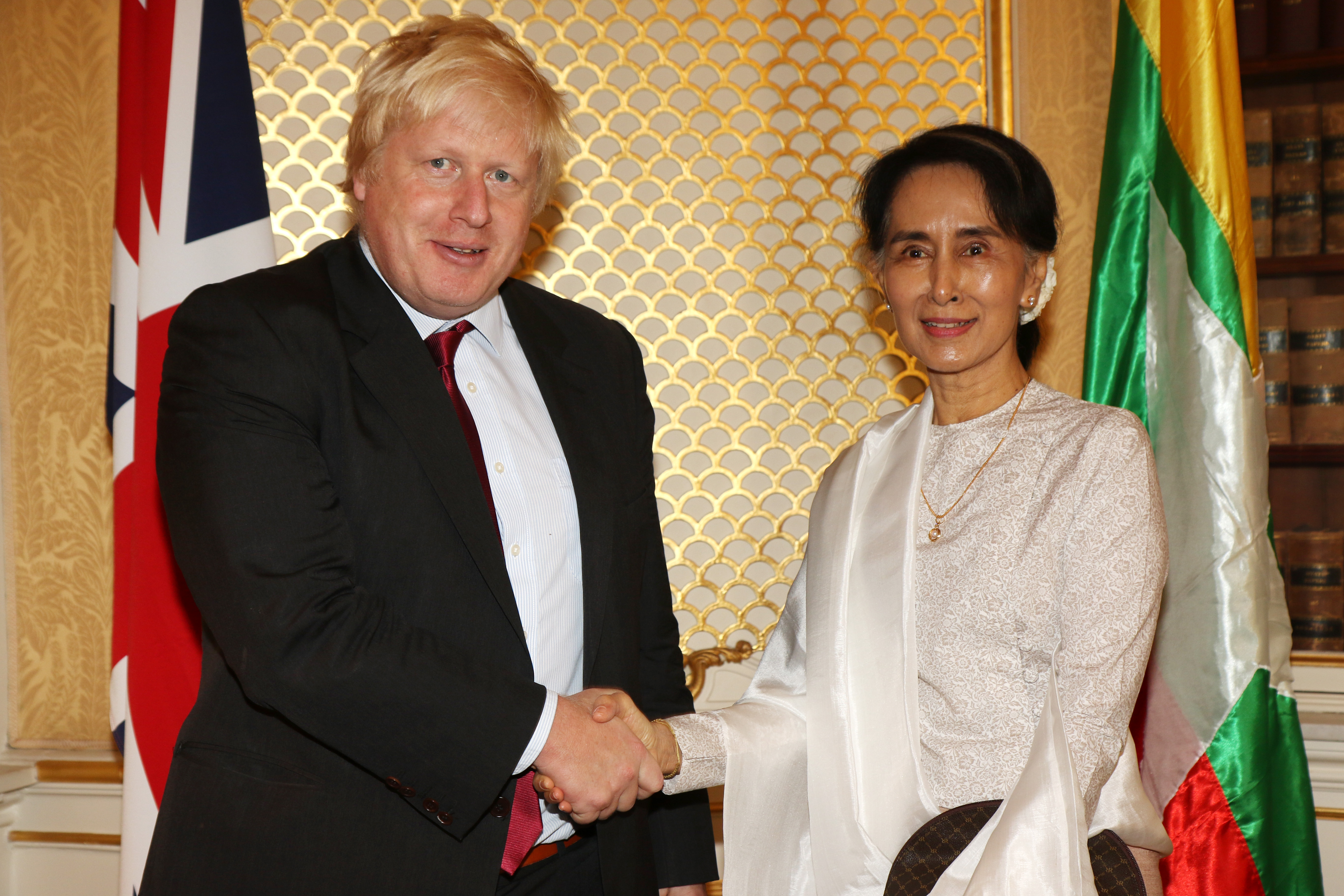
Johnson meeting Myanmar's de facto leader Aung San Suu Kyi in London, 12 September 2016

In August 2016, May called on "feuding ministers" Johnson and Liam Fox to 'stop playing games' after Fox wrote to Johnson saying that British trade could not flourish whilst future policy responsibility remained in Johnson's department. His recorded message supporting Change Britain was perceived by The Guardian as putting pressure on May to speed up the exit process though the newspaper also recorded the anger of former health minister Anna Soubry at the absence of the central "£350m-a-week bonanza for the NHS" pledge -a pledge she had previously described as a lie. In an article critical of Leave campaign figures, which noted his video and his lack of support for May, The Washington Post called him "bombastic".

Johnson supported the Saudi Arabian-led intervention in Yemen and refused to block UK arms sales to Saudi Arabia, saying there is no clear evidence of breaches of international humanitarian law by Saudi Arabia in the war in Yemen. In September 2016, he was accused of blocking the UN inquiry into Saudi war crimes in Yemen.

Johnson's first visit to Turkey as Foreign Secretary was somewhat tense due to his having won Douglas Murray's poetry competition about the President of Turkey, Recep Tayyip Erdoğan, four months earlier. When questioned by a journalist whether he would apologise for the poem, which was published by The Spectator, Johnson dismissed the matter as "trivia". Johnson pledged to help Turkey join the European Union in "any way possible" and expressed Britain’s continued support for the elected Turkish Government.

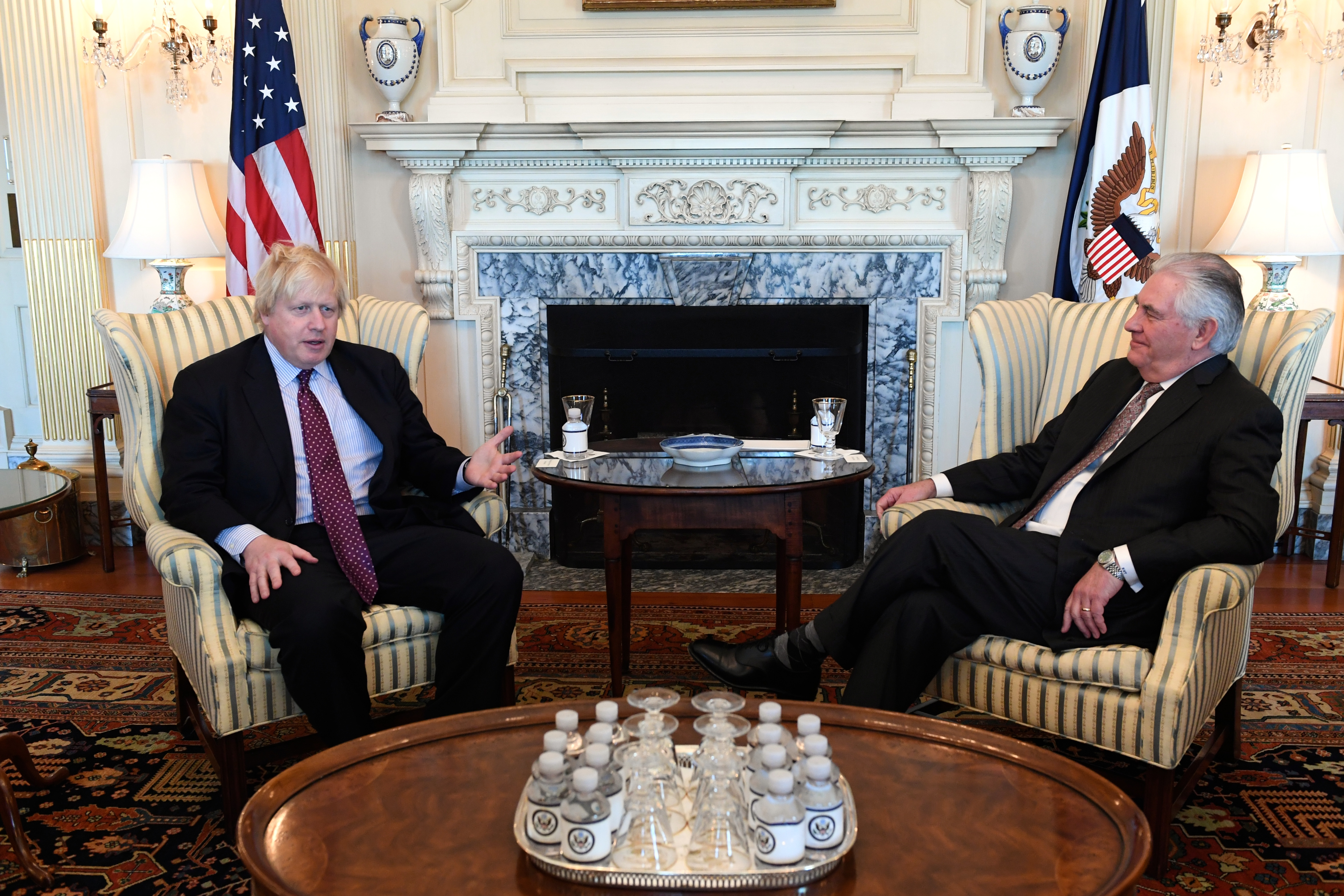
Johnson and US Secretary of State Rex Tillerson in Washington, D.C., 2017

Upon meeting with Australian Foreign Minister, Julie Bishop in late September 2016, Johnson reiterated his support for negotiating increased visa access between the United Kingdom and Australia, declaring it "odd" that Australians struggled harder to settle in Britain than European nations such as Slovakia. In January 2017, the former government minister Lord Wallace of Saltaire said that Johnson's work on Brexit had left civil servants "in despair" and that he was "alienating other EU foreign ministers". The Foreign Office defended Johnson.

In December 2016, at the Med 2 conference in Rome, Johnson said: "There are politicians who are twisting and abusing religion and different strains of the same religion in order to further their own political objectives. That's one of the biggest political problems in the whole region... That's why you've got the Saudis, Iran, everybody, moving in and puppeteering and playing proxy wars". These comments were interpreted as a diplomatic gaffe in Britain as Saudi Arabia is an ally of Britain and the biggest buyer of British arms. British prime minister Theresa May said that the foreign minister's comments did not represent the government's view.

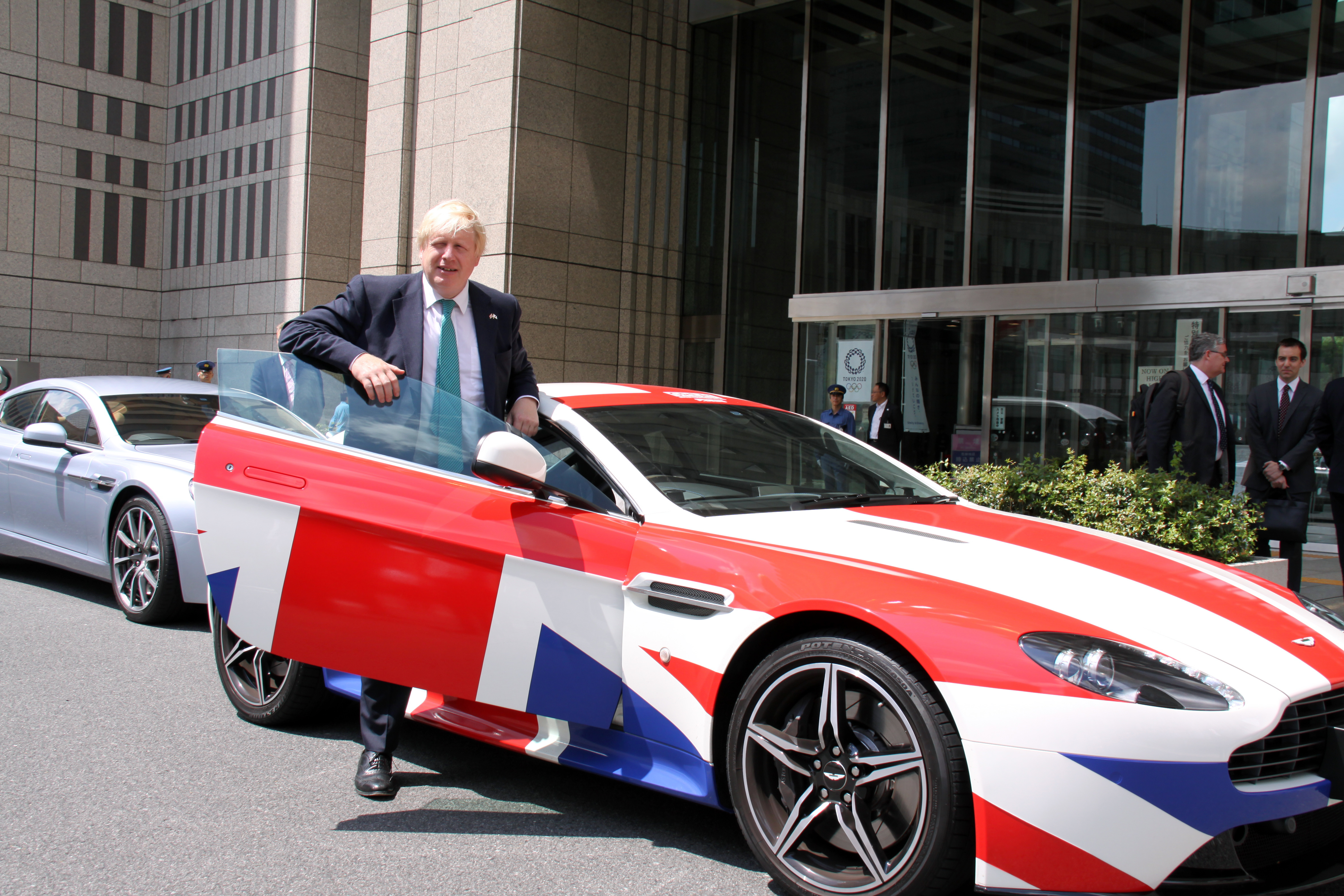
Johnson in Tokyo, Japan, 21 July 2017

Following the 2017 general election, Johnson denied media reports that he intended to challenge Theresa May for leadership of the Conservative Party. He further denied this media speculation on 16 September 2017 as well, insisting on his Twitter page that he was "all behind Theresa for a glorious Brexit."

In August 2017, Rachel Sylvester reported in The Times that Johnson was ineffective and incoherent on major issues like North Korea and Qatar whilst on Brexit, he appeared to have no idea of what was required. His rhetoric seemed to suggest that the UK could dictate the terms "as if it was some kind of public school game rather than a negotiation on which the future of the nation depends." Sylvester believed that both European ministers and White House officials regard him as a joke. This follows a Today programme interview in June on the Queens speech where, asked about the Government's answer to the "burning injustices," highlighted by Theresa May when she became prime minister, he showed a lack of understanding of the issues sufficiently serious to require prompting by Eddie Mair.

In an op-ed published in The Daily Telegraph in September 2017, Johnson reiterated that the UK would regain control of £350m a week after Brexit saying it would be fine thing if much of the money went on the NHS. He was subsequently criticised by Cabinet colleagues for reviving the assertion, and was accused of "clear misuse of official statistics" by the Chair of the UK Statistics Authority, Sir David Norgrove. The authority rejected the suggestion that it was quibbling over newspaper headlines and not Johnson's actual words. A few days later, on 19 September, the former Chancellor Kenneth Clarke said that Johnson would have been sacked if British politics were in a more straightforward period. Immediately ahead of the party conference, noting a second Johnson speech setting out terms for Brexit even before determination by the Cabinet, Ruth Davidson called for "serious people" to take over his role, criticised his overoptimism and predicted that Britain would “look very much like it looks now” after the transitional period.

On 27 February 2018 in a leaked letter to Theresa May, Johnson suggested that Northern Ireland may have to accept border controls after Brexit and that it would not seriously affect trade, having initially said a hard border would be unthinkable. 28 February 2018 he turned again stating he would publish his 18-page letter in full online as he recommitted to ruling out a hard border after Britain left the EU.

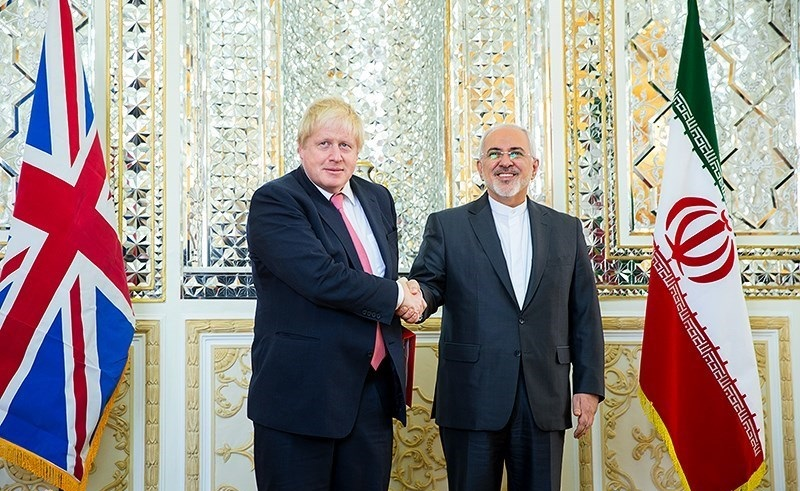
Johnson meeting with Iranian foreign minister Mohammad Javad Zarif in Tehran

Johnson caused controversy on a number of occasions. Whilst visiting a temple in Myanmar, formerly Burma, the British ambassador prevented him from reciting lines from Rudyard Kipling's poem "The Road to Mandalay," stopping him a verse before a line which refers to the Buddha as a "Bloomin' idol made o' mud". The ambassador described the colonial era poem as "not appropriate". While speaking at the 2017 Conservative Party Conference, Johnson caused upset by remarking that the Libyan city Sirte, which had been the site of sustained conflict between the so-called Islamic State and the Libyan Government of National Accord, could be the new Dubai, adding, "all they have to do is clear the dead bodies away". Following his remarks several Tory MPs called for his sacking. According to The Economist, as Foreign Secretary Johnson “is ridiculed abroad and disliked in the Foreign Office.”

Writing in the New Statesman, Martin Fletcher suggested that Johnson is harming British interests abroad. Fletcher wrote that a senior European diplomat based in London said that Johnson was "not taken seriously as a foreign policy actor" and was damaging British interests. He suggested that three-fifths of the 27 EU ambassadors in London quite like Johnson but consider him ill-suited to the job, while the remaining two-fifths "positively dislike him". My interlocutors are, of course, experts in their field and fully paid-up members of the metropolitan elite. (...) I, too, am dismayed by the harm that Johnson is doing to my country and appalled by the possibility of him becoming prime minister."

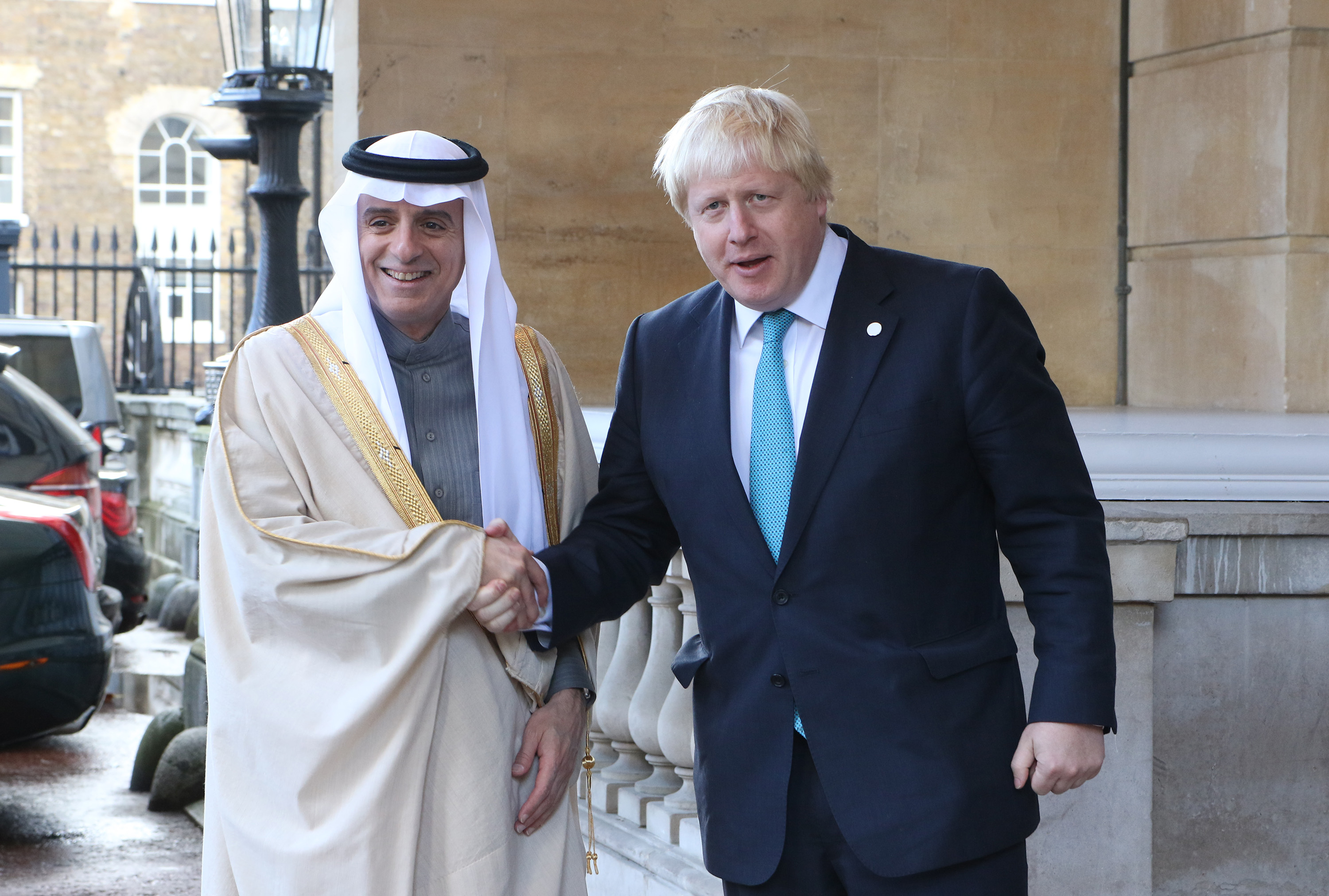
Johnson meets Saudi Arabian Foreign Minister Adel al-Jubeir. Saudi Arabia and the United Kingdom are strategic allies.

On 1 November 2017, Johnson told the Foreign Affairs Select Committee that Nazanin Zaghari-Ratcliffe, a British citizen serving a 5 year prison sentence in Iran after being arrested on holiday on suspicion of training BBC Persian employees, had been "simply teaching people journalism". Three days later, the High Council for Human Rights in Iran doubled Zaghari-Ratcliffe's sentence, using Johnson's words as evidence against her. Her family, her employer (the Thomson Reuters Foundation), and fellow politicians including Zaghari-Ratcliffe's MP Tulip Siddiq, Shadow Foreign Secretary Emily Thornberry and former Conservative Foreign Secretary Malcolm Rifkind all called on Johnson to retract his words. Johnson insisted that he had been misquoted, and that nothing he had said had justified Zaghari-Ratcliffe's sentence.

In December 2017, Johnson told The Sunday Times newspaper, "I was reading Thucydides’ History of the Peloponnesian war. It was obvious to me that Athens and its democracy, its openness, its culture and civilisation was the analogue of the United States and the West. Russia for me was closed, nasty, militaristic and antidemocratic – like Sparta."

In response to the Turkish invasion of northern Syria aimed at ousting US-backed Syrian Kurds from the enclave of Afrin, Johnson said: "Watching developments in Afrin closely. Turkey is right to want to keep its borders secure."

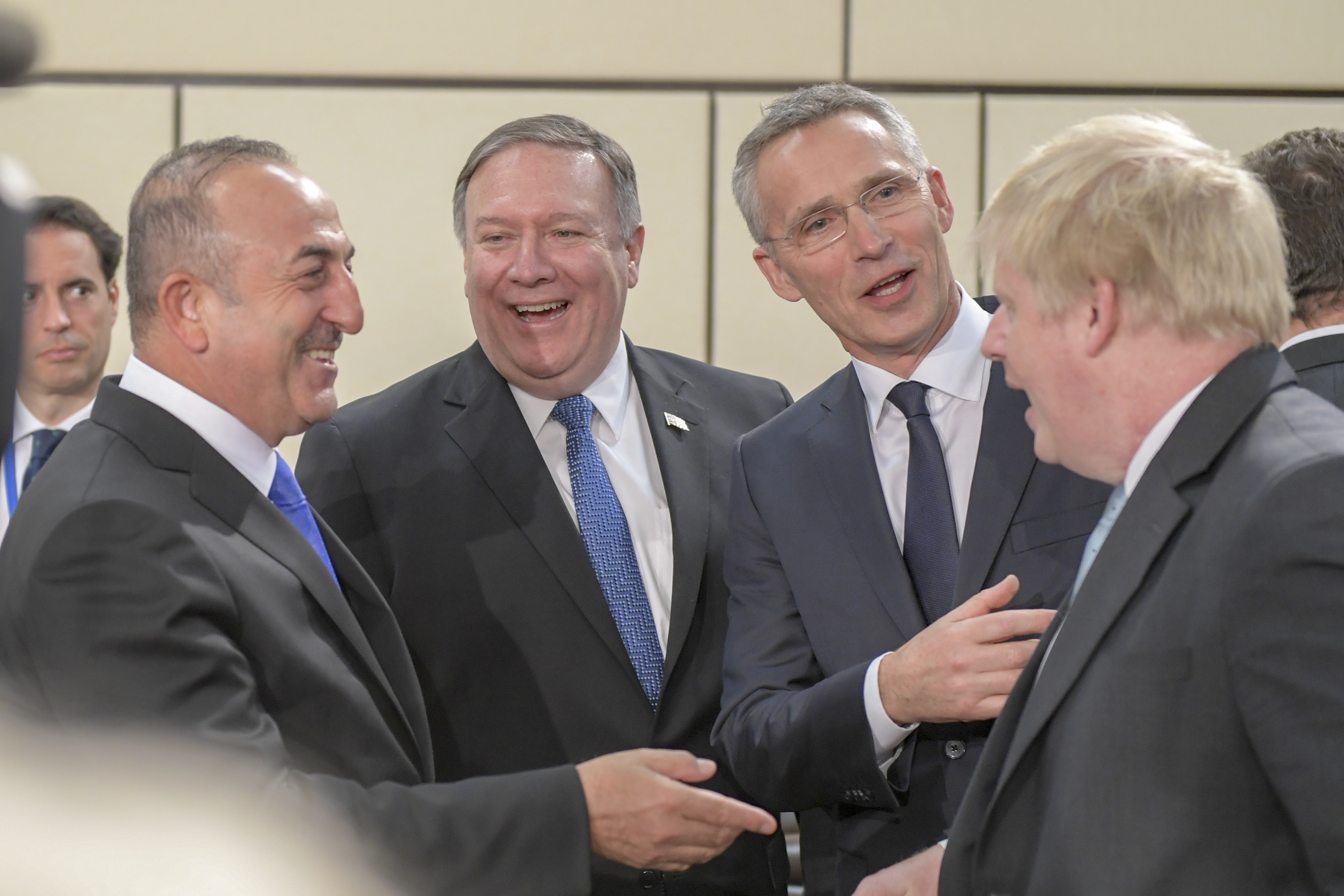
Johnson with NATO Secretary General Stoltenberg and his US and Turkish counterparts Pompeo and Çavuşoğlu, Brussels, April 2018

In March 2018, a Russian former spy, Sergei Skripal, and his daughter Yulia were poisoned in Salisbury, England, with a Novichok nerve agent. Most politicians believed that the Russian government was behind the attack. In the aftermath of the incident, Johnson provoked controversy when he compared Vladimir Putin's hosting of the World Cup in Russia to Adolf Hitler's hosting of the Olympic Games in Berlin in 1936.

On 20 March 2018, Johnson said in an interview with Deutsche Welle that scientists from the Porton Down laboratory were “absolutely categorical” about the Russian origin of the substance used. "I mean, I asked the guy myself," Johnson said. "I said: 'Are you sure?' And he said: 'There's no doubt.' So we have very little alternative but to take the action that we have taken." On 3 April 2018, Gary Aitkenhead, the chief executive of the Government's Defence Science and Technology Laboratory (DSTL) at Porton Down responsible for testing the substance involved in the case, said that they had been unable to verify the "precise source" of the Novichok nerve agent. Labour MP Chris Williamson tweeted that Johnson had "just lied to justify our country's foreign policy."

In March 2018, Johnson was reprimanded by Commons Speaker John Bercow for using what he called sexist language. Bercow intervened after Johnson referred to the shadow foreign secretary Emily Thornberry as Lady Nugee. Mrs Thornberry is married to High Court judge Sir Christopher Nugee – but has chosen to go by her maiden name. Bercow said it was "inappropriate and sexist" to refer to her as Lady Nugee. Johnson subsequently apologised for his "inadvertent sexism".

In May 2018, Johnson backed the Iran nuclear deal framework despite Donald Trump's withdrawal. Johnson opined that the deal could bring economic benefits to the Iranian people.

In May 2018, Turkish President Recep Tayyip Erdoğan arrived in the United Kingdom for a three-day state visit. Erdoğan declared that the United Kingdom is "an ally and a strategic partner, but also a real friend." Liberal Democrat leader Vincent Cable denounced the visit, saying that "By permitting a state visit and audience with the Queen, May and Boris Johnson are essentially rolling out the red carpet for a man with a disregard for human rights, who is responsible for alarming oppression and violence."

In June 2018, Johnson praised the North Korea–United States summit, tweeting "Welcome the news that President Trump and Kim Jong Un have held constructive talks in Singapore. The DPRK’s commitment to complete denuclearization of the Korean Peninsula is an important first step towards a stable and prosperous future."

In June 2018, while attending an event for EU diplomats in London, Johnson was reported to have been asked about corporate concerns over a so-called hard Brexit. In response to the question, Johnson was reported to have said "Fuck business".

In July 2018, three days after the cabinet had its meeting at Chequers to agree a Brexit strategy, Johnson, along with Brexit Secretary David Davis, resigned their posts.

=== International trips ===
This is a list of international visits undertaken by Johnson while serving as the Foreign Secretary. The list includes both private travel and official visits. The list includes only foreign travel which the Foreign Secretary made during his tenure in the position.

==== Summary ====
	Country	Locations	Details	Dates
1	Ukraine	Kyiv	Met with President Petro Poroshenko, Senior Ministers and announced additional funding for a demining project.	14 July 2016
2	Turkey	Ankara	Held high-level talks with Turkey's leaders focused on UK support in Syria.	25–27 September 2016
3	Germany	Berlin	Met the German Foreign Minister Frank-Walter Steinmeier in Berlin.	4 November 2016
5	Kosovo	Pristina	Addressed the Assembly of the Republic of Kosovo.	10 November 2016
5	Serbia	Belgrade	Met the Serbian Prime Minister Aleksandar Vučić.	10 November 2016
5	Czech Republic	Prague	Met with the Czech Foreign Minister Zaoralek.	11 November 2016
6	Cyprus	Nicosia	Held talks with the President of Cyprus and the leader of the Turkish Cypriot community.	29–30 November 2016
7	India	New Delhi & Kalkota	Met the Finance Minister Jaitley, Minister of External Affairs and Chief Minister of West Bengal.	18–19 January 2017
7	Myanmar	Berlin	The first Foreign Secretary to travel to Myanmar(Burma) in 5 years. Met with the President and the State Counsellor of Myanmar and pro democracy leader Aung San Suu Kyi.	20–21 January 2017
8	Gambia	Berlin	Met with President Adama Barrow.	14 February 2017
8	Ghana	Berlin	Met with President Nana Akufo-Addo.	15 February 2017
9	Egypt	Berlin	Met with President Abdel Fattah el-Sisi and his counterpart Foreign Minister Shoukry.	25 February 2017
10	Belgium	Brussels	Attended the EU Foreign Affairs Council.	6 March 2017
11	Somalia	Berlin	Met with President Mohamed Abdullahi Mohamed ahead of the 2017 London Somalia Conference discussing the UK-Somalia partnership.	15 March 2017
12	Ethiopia	Berlin	Outlined the potential for a deeper partnership on prosperity and regional security.	16 March 2017
13	Belgium	Brussles	Attended NATO Summit focused on Russia	18 April 2018
14	Italy	Perugia	Met with former KGB agent Alexander Lebedev without officials at a party at his villa in Italy.	20 April 2018

This list is still incomplete.

== See also ==
- Premiership of Theresa May
- Premiership of Boris Johnson
