= European policy =

Map of the European Union

European policy (German: Europapolitik) refers to policies pursued by state or societal actors and international organizations that are focused on Europe. Today, the term predominantly refers to the European Union and its institutions. However, it occasionally also refers to other organizations such as the Council of Europe.

In the member states of the European Union, the goals of European policy are primarily to strengthen European integration while simultaneously asserting national interests in European decision-making processes. In candidate and accession countries, European policy is geared towards the introduction of the "acquis communautaire" and accession to the Union.

In some countries, European policy is interpreted as part of foreign policy. In others, however, there are also dedicated ministries or state secretaries for European affairs.

== European policy of individual countries ==
=== Germany ===
European policy in Germany is pursued by a multitude of actors. The most important actor is the Federal Government, which responds to European policy issues according to the principle of ministerial responsibility. Furthermore, the German federal states are very active in European policy. The Bundestag and Bundesrat are actors strengthened by the Treaty of Lisbon (2007). The most important instrument for state actors in European policy is European coordination.

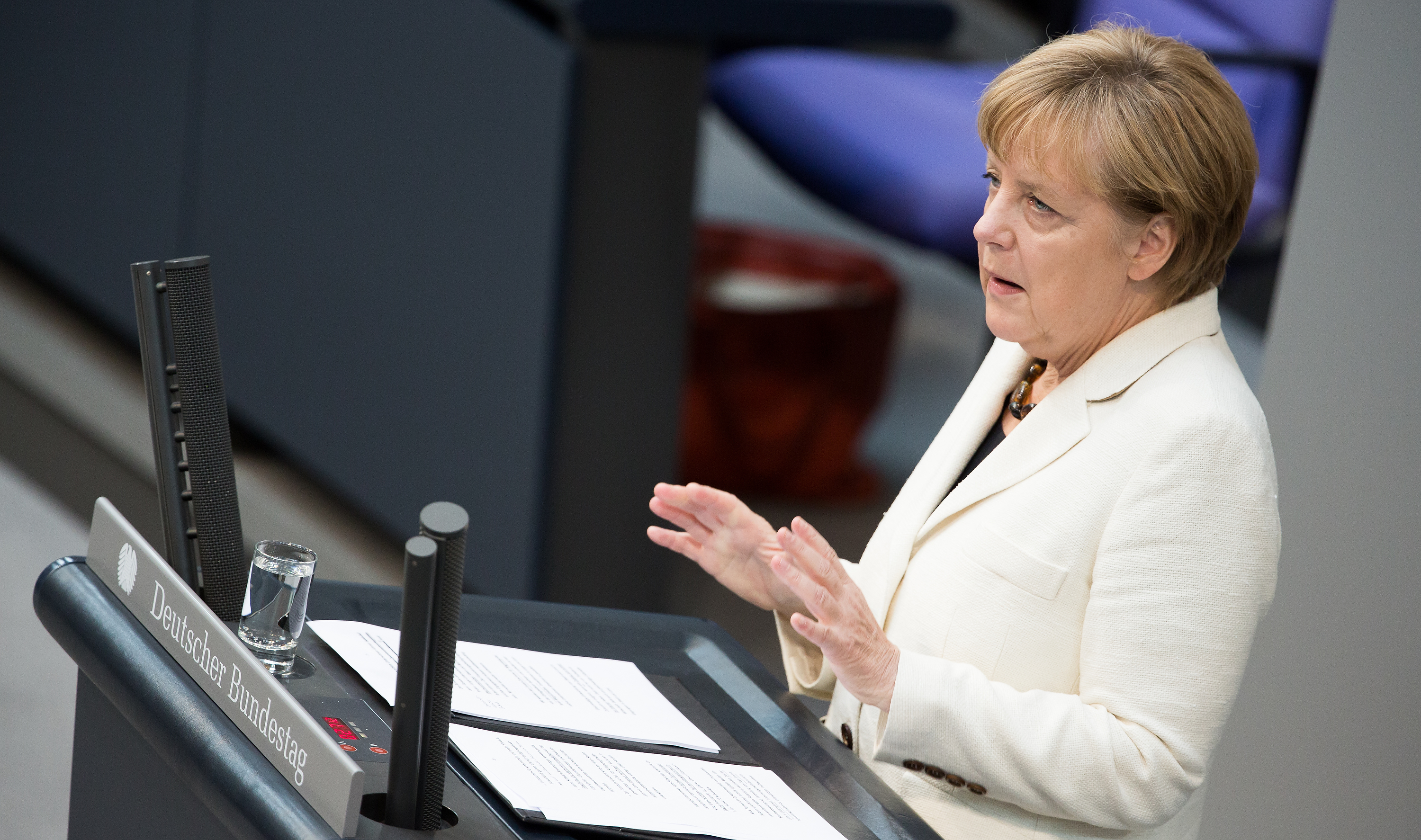
As Chancellor of Germany Angela Merkel dominated European policy in the 2000s and 2010s.

The influence of lobbyists, who are active in European politics in Brussels and Strasbourg, as well as in the federal capital and the state capitals, is often underestimated in Germany. The role of German Members of the European Parliament , who are nominated by their parties and operate relatively independently in the increasingly powerful Strasbourg Parliament, is also underestimated. This may be related to the fact that the European level is often still neglected by parties, which is also evident in election campaigns for European Parliament elections, where predominantly national rather than European issues are addressed.

Traditionally, German European policy was part of foreign policy, but due to the strong policy interdependence within the EU, it is becoming increasingly common to speak of European domestic policy. In practice, disputes over competence regarding European coordination regularly arise, particularly between the Federal Foreign Office and the Federal Chancellery. The German federal states also strive to influence European policy, both through the Federal Council and the Federal Government, and directly through their state representations in Brussels. Overall, German European policy, regardless of the parties in power from Adenauer to Merkel, can be described as having a pro-integration stance, in contrast to, for example, British European policy. Since the outbreak of the financial crisis in 2007, it has become increasingly problematic that integration-oriented European policy is an elite project for which public support – not only in Germany – is declining.

=== United Kingdom ===
The United Kingdom was only admitted to the European Economic Community on 1 January 1973, after initial negotiations by Prime Ministers Harold Macmillan in 1963 and Harold Wilson in 1967 had twice failed due to the French veto of Charles de Gaulle. The successful accession negotiations were led by the Conservative Prime Minister Edward Heath , who also secured the accession through domestic politics.

By 1973, the economic growth forces that had driven the first phase of European integration had lost their momentum as the first oil crisis began in October 1973. Also in 1973, the Bretton Woods system, which had established fixed exchange rates for the participating currencies, collapsed. In Great Britain, this led to a surge in inflation for various reasons, followed by stagflation.

All of this seemed to confirm the views of British Eurosceptics who had rejected joining the EU, anticipating more disadvantages than advantages. A key argument of the EC/EU opponents was, and remains, the fear that the sovereignty of the two chambers of the British Parliament: the House of Commons (lower house) and the House of Lords (upper house) in decisions concerning central issues of British policy could be restricted or jeopardized if too many powers were transferred from Parliament to EU institutions. Conservative critics viewed excessive transfers of power as a breach of the constitution; the political left feared in the 1970s that the EC could make it more difficult or even impossible for them to implement national socialist policies.

In May 1979, the Conservative Margaret Thatcher became Prime Minister and remained so until November 1990. Her famous demand, "We want our money back!", which she had been making in various forms since 1976, represented her uncompromising negotiating strategy. In 1984, she succeeded in negotiating the so-called British rebate for payments to the EU.

"Labour and Conservative governments have generally defined Britain's role in the EU in very similar ways in practice. For them, the EU remained an economic community of interest, a market for British goods, and – with regard to the reduction of trade barriers in the single market since 1993 – a competition policy challenge. In 1979, immediately after Margaret Thatcher took office as Prime Minister, the EC was confronted at the Dublin Summit with Britain's demand for a reduction of its contributions by one billion pounds (Margaret Thatcher: 'We want our money back'). Negotiations on this issue were not resolved until the 1984 Fontainebleau Summit. The EC guaranteed Britain a repayment of 66 percent of the difference between its EC contribution and the EC benefits it received from the United Kingdom." For the Conservative government, its agreement to the European Single Market in 1986 (Single European Act) was consistent with its market-oriented policies. However, the Thatcher government vehemently opposed any deepening of political integration, in contrast to the economic integration it promoted. It was only under strong pressure from her party, big business, and the City of London, the international financial center, that the Prime Minister agreed to Britain's accession to the European Monetary System (EMS) in 1990

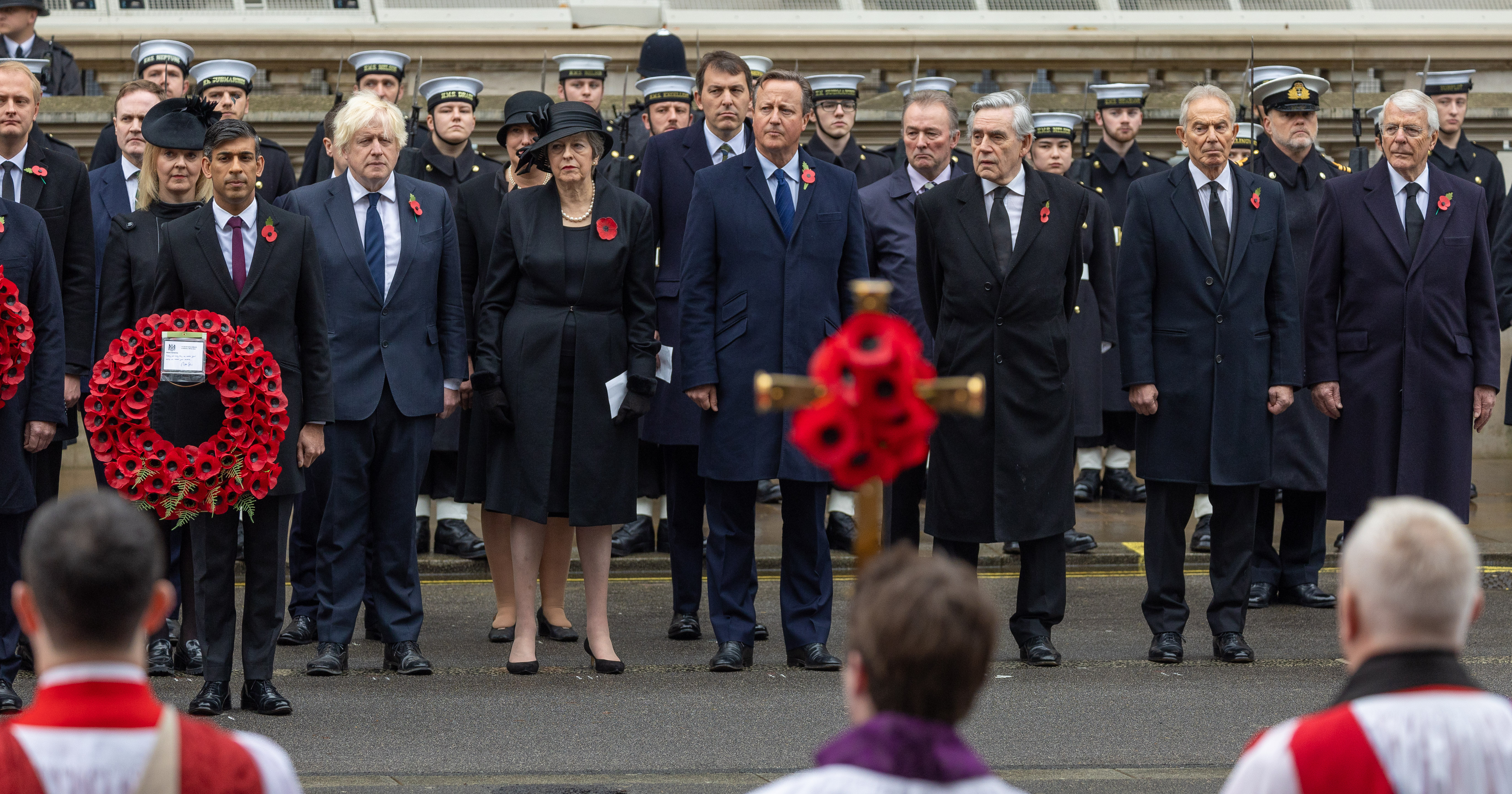
The British prime ministers (pictured in 2023) from left to right: Liz Truss, Rishi Sunak, Boris Johnson, Theresa May, David Cameron, Gordon Brown, Tony Blair and John Major.

Thatcher's successors, John Major (1990–1997), Tony Blair (1997–2007), and Gordon Brown (2007–2010), gave greater priority to European policy and advocated for a more constructive European policy for Great Britain compared to Thatcher. It was in the 2000s that the Eurosceptic UK Independence Party gained in prominence. In 2012, the Conservative prime minister David Cameron announced that, if re-elected, he would hold another referendum on Britain's continued membership in the EU by 2017. There had long been disgruntlements from his backbenchers over the European issue. In the referendum the UK voted to leave the EU by 52% to 48%.

Cameron resigned as Prime Minister and was succeeded by Theresa May who intended to pursue a policy of "Brexit means Brexit"; appointing Boris Johnson to the role of Foreign Secretary. After the 2017 United Kingdom general election resulted in a hung parliament, the European Union became the primary issue in British politics. The Brexit debate was also difficult for the leader of the Labour Party Jeremy Corbyn who pledged a "soft brexit". The customs union and the single market were particularly important factors. By 2019, the Brexit negotiations had broken down completely. The Conservatives suffered a crushing defeat in the 2019 European Parliament election to the Brexit Party of Nigel Farage. Theresa May resigned and was replaced with Boris Johnson who called a snap election which resulted in a landslide victory. The Brexit withdrawal agreement passed and Brexit concluded when the UK left the European Union on 31 January 2020. Since 2020, the controversial Northern Ireland Protocol was challenged by Unionists in Northern Ireland. The Windsor Framework in 2023 dealt with post-Brexit trade arrangements. Keir Starmer has pledged a reset of relations with Europe.

=== France ===
France is one of the six founding members of the EEC, the precursor to today's EU, and, like Germany, is still considered an important driving force behind European integration. Through European integration, France seeks to prevent a loss of its own country's influence in the world. Another goal is to integrate Germany into Europe and prevent it from becoming too powerful. France has always been in favor of increasing integration and therefore views enlargement critically, as more member states slow down the integration process.

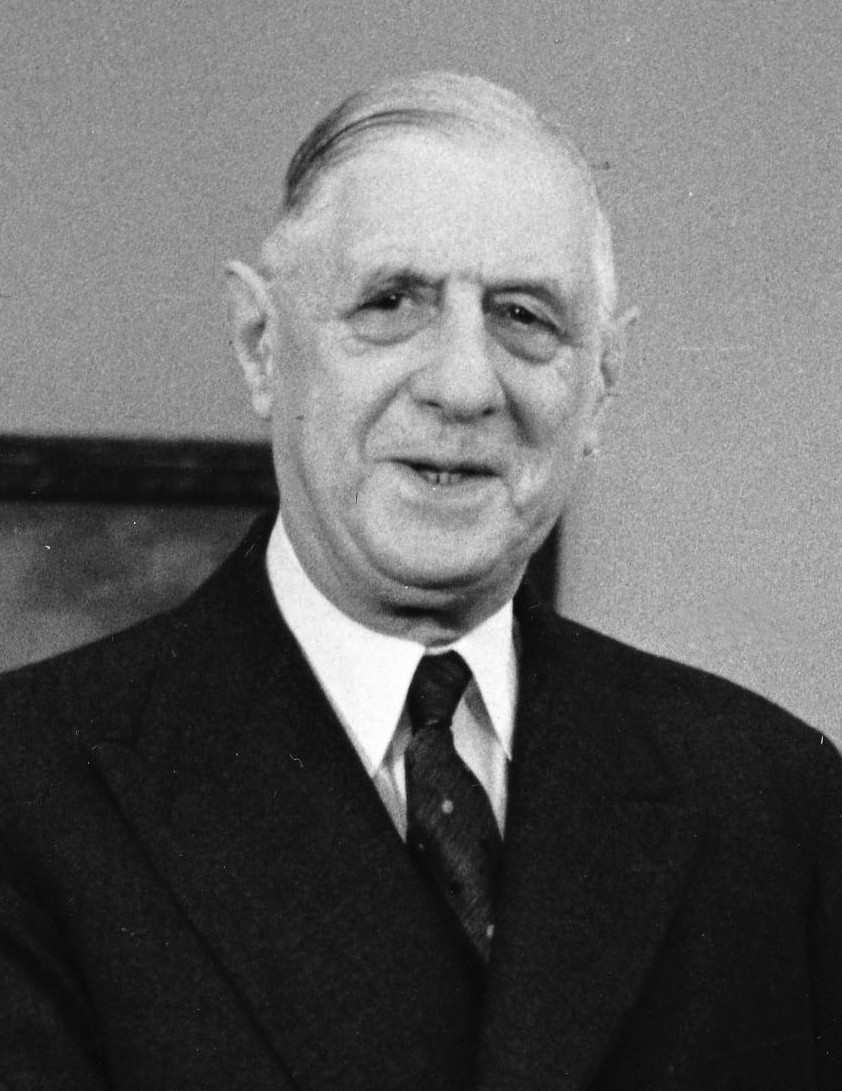
Charles De Gaulle is known for playing a significant role in French European policy

French European policy is primarily shaped by the French president, who often has considerable influence over foreign, European, and security policy. Especially when the president and government (and thus the parliamentary majority) belong to the same party (or coalition), the president has a free hand. However, as soon as a cohabitation period occurs, in which the president and head of government belong to different parties, competition can arise, particularly if the incumbent prime minister has ambitions for the presidency. In these cases, the prime minister faces a dilemma, as he must, on the one hand, establish his own profile in European and foreign policy, while on the other hand, he does not want to diminish the president's power, since he himself aspires to the office.

De Gaulle, as the first president of the Fifth Republic, played a significant role in French European policy, having shaped its beginnings, particularly through reconciliation with Germany. For him, as for most of his successors, France's sovereignty and political power were paramount, which in European policy led France to prefer intergovernmental EU institutions such as the council to the supranational European Parliament. In European policy controversies, de Gaulle often succeeded in asserting his position; for example, in the two British accession applications that failed due to his veto in 1963 and 1967. A method in French European policy of his time that was not well received by its European partners was the "empty chair" policy of 1965. De Gaulle also proposed the Fouchet Plans . One consistent aspect of French European policy is the following objective: within and through the EU, France aims to maintain a special political weight in Europe and the world, something that seemed self-evident during de Gaulle's presidency. Therefore, France has always strived for a common foreign and security policy and a European security and defence policy.

Another key issue is the EU's Common Agricultural Policy, as the French agricultural industry in particular benefits from it. When Gerhard Schröder, during his time as Chancellor of Germany, proposed that the principles of agricultural policy be decided more strongly at the national level, France opposed this, fearing that it could lead to the loss of EU subsidies. President Jacques Chirac and Schröder finally agreed in 2002 that nothing should change until 2007 and that funding for agriculture should not increase thereafter. British proposals for reforming the costly EU agricultural policy were also generally rejected by France.

The period from 1990 to 1992 under François Mitterrand is referred to as the "golden age" of French European policy. In 1992, the French electorate rejected the Maastricht Treaty in a referendum. Ten years later, they rejected the Treaty establishing a Constitution for Europe in a referendum. After Nicolas Sarkozy became French president in 2007, he announced France's return to Europe.

France was critical of the 2004 EU enlargement, as it made Germany the new center of the EU, while France felt marginalized. President Sarkozy proposed the idea of a Mediterranean Union, which, however, met with little enthusiasm within the EU. Ultimately, the Union for the Mediterranean was created as a compromise.

On 15 May 2012, François Hollande became the new president, the second socialist president of France after Mitterrand. Since the Socialists won the parliamentary elections in June 2012, there was no cohabitation. The 2017 French presidential election was won by Emmanuel Macron who defeated Marine Le Pen. Macron has pursued a pro-European foreign policy with founding the European Political Community.

=== Italy ===
After the fall of Benito Mussolini, King Victor Emmanuel III of Italy and his prime minister, Marshal Pietro Badoglio, realized that Italy could not remain neutral. They both understood that Italy had to continue participating in the war and align itself with the Allies. The partial occupation of Italy by German troops left no other option. Alcide de Gasperi, Italy's foreign minister from 1944 to 1946, sensed that the Americans and the British viewed Italy not as an ally, but as a defeated nation. De Gasperi, who had served as Prime Minister from 1945 to 1953, had to form a government without socialists and communists in 1947 : the goal was to secure US reconstruction aid (the Marshall Plan). However, when Italy became a founding member of NATO in 1949, de Gasperi faced a domestic "No" front of Communists, left-wing Catholics, Social Democrats, and Socialists. In these difficult times, both domestically and internationally, he ultimately saw a way out: Europe. By opening up to Europe, de Gasperi tapped into a pro-European sentiment among the population, which allowed him to appease the aforementioned "No" front. From this starting point, Italy became a founding member of the Council of Europe, the European Coal and Steel Community, the Western European Union (WEU), and finally the European Economic Community (EEC) (Treaties of Rome, March 1957).

In the early 1960s, the Italian Socialists (PSI) and the Social Democrats in West Germany (SPD) found themselves challenged by de Gaulle. De Gaulle's vision of a Europe stretching from the Urals to the Atlantic and France's standing within both NATO and European organizations were shaped by his ambition for French "grandeur". His aim was to reaffirm France's greatness in the context of the Cold War. Consequently, de Gaulle's decisions were not always accepted by the Western partners. His disapproval of European policy reinforced the PSI and the SPD's commitment to supporting European integration and the institutions it had created, following its failure in the early 1950s. In the early 1960s, coalitions between social democratic and Christian democratic parties became possible in Italy and Germany, significantly influencing European policy.

Subsequently, Italy participated in all major acts of European integration (Maastricht, Amsterdam, Nice, support for Eastern enlargement) until the 1990s, though not without difficulties. Prime Minister Giulio Andreotti made the decision to join the European Monetary System (EMS) in 1979 against the vote of the Italian central bank (Banca d'Italia). Due to massive national debt, high inflation rates, and the failed fiscal policies of Italian governments in the 1980s, Italy had to withdraw from the EMS in 1992.

Besides the sovereign debt crisis, Italy faced other political problems in the 1990s. The country experienced a crisis of the established parties, accompanied by problems with the welfare state, the labor market, and the currency, as well as violent crime and social tensions. In this situation, the Maastricht Treaty and its convergence criteria enforced greater political discipline, particularly stronger efforts to establish financial stability. To this end, the "technical governments" of Giuliano Amato, Carlo Azeglio Ciampi, and Lamberto Dini implemented ambitious, sometimes painful, but ultimately essential reforms.

After tough negotiations and even tougher restrictions, Italy was readmitted to the EMS in 1996, thanks to the decisive course of Finance and Budget Minister Ciampi, the consistent leadership of Romano Prodi as Prime Minister, and the support of all partners in the then center-left coalition majority. Three years later, on 1 January 1999, the country joined the European Monetary Union (EMU). This was made possible primarily by the fiscal policy of the time and a related tax increase, as well as partial deregulation and privatizations, which the Italians accepted almost without complaint.

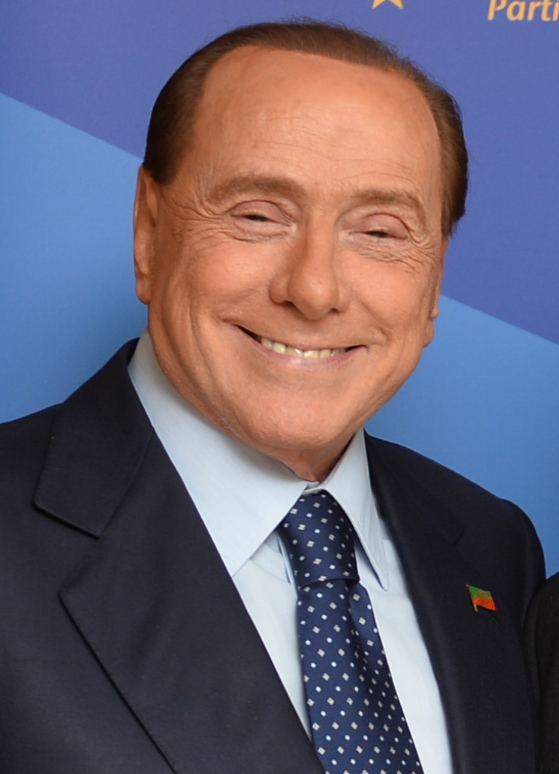
Silvio Berlusconi changed Italian European policy to a more sceptical position.

On 1 January 2002, the euro was introduced as the currency in Italy. Following the 2001 elections, a new center-right coalition government, consisting of the parties Forza Italia (FI), Lega Nord (LN), Alleanza Nazionale (AN), and Unione Democratica Cristiana (UDC), assumed political leadership. The new government viewed European integration critically with the domination of nationalist and anti-European forces, particularly within the AN and LN, which strained relations with European institutions. Silvio Berlusconi pursued a shaky relationship with Europe and was much derided by Brussels.

Since 2011, the “technical governments” of Mario Monti and Enrico Letta initiated a strong reform process to combat the euro crisis and Italy's national debt. On 27 February 2014, the Democratic Party (PD) became a member of the Progressive Alliance of Socialists and Democrats (S&D) group in the European Parliament.

From 1 July to the end of December 2014, Italy held the EU Council Presidency from Greece The Italian Presidency's program comprised three main areas:

- “Europe for economic growth and employment”, with a focus on structural reforms and innovation;
- “Europe closer to its citizens: an area of democracy, law and freedom”: The aim was to create greater proximity to citizens, promoted, among other things, by more reliable and transparent institutions;
- “New impetus for European foreign policy”: the focus here was primarily on the Mediterranean region and the EU's immediate neighbouring states, with particular attention to migration policy.

In 2014, Italy nominated Minister of Foreign Affairs Federica Mogherini as a member of the European Commission. She served as High Representative of the European Union for Foreign Affairs and Security Policy and Vice-President of the European Commission.

Italy was committed to the swift implementation of the Lisbon Treaty with regard to the rapid establishment of the European External Action Service (EEAS). In the 2010s, Italy has actively supported the EU enlargement process, particularly the accession of potential new members (especially Turkey and the Western Balkan countries). EU growth, employment, strengthening the EU's external trade, and migration, asylum, and refugee policy were key priorities for Italy at the European level.

Since the 2022 Italian general election, Giorgia Meloni has reportedly emerged as an influential leader within the European Union. According to POLITICO, she has struck a balance between Washington DC and Brussels.

=== Poland ===
For the first 15 years after the fall of communism, Polish foreign policy focused on integration into the Transatlantic Partnership and the European Union. Accession negotiations with the EU began in 1998. At that time, Polish European policy was characterized by the demands of EU enlargement, the improvement of European agricultural policy, and Poland's participation in the discussion on the Common Foreign and Security Policy and the development of European policy towards Eastern Europe.

On 1 May 2004, Poland joined the EU as part of its largest enlargement round to date. Since then, Polish policy has been guided by the principle of acting in the interests of its citizens and the European community. Therefore, Poland advocates for strengthening the EU's international position through the development of common policy instruments.

Between 2005 and 2007, a coalition led by the moderately Eurosceptic Law and Justice (PiS) party won a majority in the Polish parliament (Sejm). This led to a shift in priorities in Poland's European policy. The new government's limited willingness to compromise resulted in friction between Poland and the EU. The dispute over voting weights in the EU after the Eastern enlargement serves as an example of this. The electoral success of the liberal-conservative Civic Platform (PO) in 2007 led to the stabilization of Polish foreign policy and, consequently, its European policy. Since 2007, there has been a unified line in Polish European policy, with the help of which the priorities of competitiveness, solidarity and openness are pursued and implemented sustainably and in view of political events in Europe and the world.

The first government of Donald Tusk aimed to deepen European integration at the economic and political levels. It also emphasized the need to strengthen European institutions and gradually create a political union. Strengthening the EU's common foreign and security policy is also a guiding principle of Polish European policy.

Polish policy towards NATO and the EU is based on the principle of the "open door" and is geared towards supporting the further enlargement of the alliances, especially with regard to Eastern European countries. The country aims to develop the eastern dimensions of the EU and advocates for closer cooperation with its eastern neighbours, including Ukraine. Poland, along with Sweden, is one of the initiators of the Eastern Partnership.

Poland supports the continuation of EU enlargement as a clear consequence of the Union's open, democratic and rule-of-law-based approach to its neighbouring countries and points to the positive effects of enlargement in Central and Eastern Europe.

Poland committed to adopting the common European currency upon joining the EU. However, as the introduction of the euro is contingent on the economic situation of the eurozone and Poland's macroeconomic and legal preparations, this did not happen. Accession to the eurozone is not planned in the foreseeable future. Politically, the country therefore advocates for reducing the divide between the eurozone and other EU countries.

Poland is also among the countries that benefit most from the EU's cohesion policy. Despite the economic crisis, the government in Warsaw supported the expansion of the financial framework for 2014–2020. Poland also supports the further development of the EU single market, particularly with regard to the free movement of persons and the free movement of goods and services. The government in Warsaw views EU membership as the foundation for Poland's "civilizational" development.

The country is committed to creating an Energy Union within Europe, which is to be based on the principle of solidarity. It supported the plans to build the South Stream pipeline but was skeptical of the Nord Stream pipeline project because it bypasses Poland and thus affects the country's energy security. As a country whose energy comes mainly from coal, the Polish government is skeptical of the EU's energy and climate targets, especially the reduction of greenhouse gas emissions by 2030.

Within Europe, Poland also participates in regional initiatives, including the Visegrád Group with the Czech Republic, Slovakia, and Hungary. Joint strategies for the region's development are being developed as part of this cooperation. Furthermore, the partnership with France and Germany within the framework of the Weimar Triangle is considered strategically important.

Poland held the EU Council Presidency from June to December 2011. The following priorities were set for this period:

- European integration as a basis for growth
- A secure Europe – food, energy, defence
- Europe benefiting from openness

Jerzy Buzek, the former prime minister of Poland, was President of the European Parliament from 2009 to 2012. Since November 2014, Donald Tusk, Prime Minister of Poland from 2007 to 2014, has held the office of President of the European Council. From 2009 to 2014, Janusz Lewandowski, a Polish economist, was responsible for financial planning and budget at the European Commission. Since 2014, Elżbieta Bieńkowska has been working on the internal market at the commission.

== Criticism of current European policy ==
Jürgen Habermas makes a clear case for a new European policy, one oriented towards the traditions of the constitutional state and focused on strengthening the democratic rights of citizens as European integration progresses. Habermas criticizes the following deficiency of current European policy: “Because, to put it simply, competences in the Union are distributed in such a way that Brussels and the European Court of Justice enforce economic freedoms, while the resulting external costs are passed on to the member states, there is still no common economic policy decision-making. [...] And every country pursues its own foreign policy, above all the Federal Republic of Germany.”

Habermas fears “that politics is running out of steam for such a large project as the unification of Europe. [...] Perhaps the motivations that are currently lacking can only be generated from below, from civil society itself.” Habermas calls for – contrary to a purely technocratic European policy – a Europe as a community of solidarity, organized not as a federal state, but as a supranational democracy.

== See also ==
- Politisches System der Europäischen Union
- Europaministerium

== Literature ==
- Timm Beichelt: Deutschland und Europa. die Europäisierung des politischen Systems. VS Verlag für Sozialwissenschaften, Wiesbaden 2009, ISBN 978-3-531-15141-0. (google book)
- Jürgen Habermas: Zur Verfassung Europas. Ein Essay. Edition Suhrkamp, Frankfurt am Main 2011, ISBN 978-3-518-06214-2.
- Jürgen Habermas: Im Sog der Technokratie. Kleine politische Schriften XII. Suhrkamp, Berlin 2013, ISBN 978-3-518-12671-4.
- Hans-Dieter Lucas: Europa vom Atlantik bis zum Ural? Europapolitik und Europadenken im Frankreich der Ära de Gaulle (1958–1969). (= Pariser Historische Studien. 35). Bouvier, Bonn 1992, ISBN 978-3-416-02400-6. (Digitalisat)
- Michael Melcher: Awkwardness and Reliability. Die britische Europapolitik von 1997–2013. (= Wissenschaftliche Beiträge aus dem Tectum-Verlag. Band 61). Tectum, Marburg 2014, ISBN 978-3-8288-3472-9.
- Gisela Müller-Brandeck-Bocquet, Corina Schukraft, Nicole Leuchtweis, Ulrike Keßler: Deutsche Europapolitik. Von Adenauer bis Merkel. 2. Auflage. VS Verlag, Wiesbaden 2010, ISBN 978-3-531-16392-5.
- Julia Quante: Drawn into the Heart of Europe? Die britische Europapolitik im Spiegel von Karikaturen (1973–2008). LIT Verlag, Berlin/Münster 2013, ISBN 978-3-643-11538-6.
- Susanne Wanninger: New Labour und die EU. Die Europapolitik der Regierung Blair. (= Münchner Beiträge zur europäischen Einigung). Nomos, Baden-Baden 2007.
- Werner Weidenfeld (Hrsg.): Die Europäische Union. Politisches System und Politikbereiche. (= Schriftenreihe der Bundeszentrale für politische Bildung. Band 442). Bonn 2004, ISBN 978-3-89331-545-1.
- Werner Weidenfeld, Wolfgang Wessels (Hrsg.): Europa von A bis Z. Taschenbuch der europäischen Integration. 9. Auflage. Institut für Europäische Politik, Berlin 2006, ISBN 978-3-8329-1378-6.

=== Poland ===
- D. Bingen: Polnische Europapolitik, polnische Nachbarschaftspolitik. In: E. Bos, J. Dieringer: Die Genese einer Union der 27. Die Europäische Union nach der Osterweiterung. Wiesbaden 2008, ISBN 978-3-531-15744-3, S. 381–396.
- A. Kociołek, M. Zarouni: Polen. In: W. Gieler (Hrsg.): Außenpolitik im europäischen Vergleich. Ein Handbuch der Staaten Europas von A–Z. Berlin 2012, ISBN 978-3-643-11648-2, S. 347–363.
- Paweł Musiałek (Hrsg.): Główne kierunki polityki zagranicznej rządu Donalda Tuska w latach 2007–2011. Kraków 2012, ISBN 978-83-7482-483-5.
- H. Münch: Leitbilder und Grundverständnisse der polnischen Europapolitik. Wiesbaden 2007, ISBN 978-3-531-15363-6.
- MSZ: Poland’s 10 years in the European Union. 2014, ISBN 978-83-63743-88-8.
- MSZ: Priorytety polskiej polityki zagranicznej 2012–2016. Warszawa 2012.
- K. Szpak: Polityka zagraniczna na forum Unii Europejskiej. In: Paweł Musiałek (Hrsg.): Główne kierunki polityki zagranicznej rządu Donalda Tuska w latach 2007–2011. Kraków 2012, ISBN 978-83-7482-483-5, S. 81–105.
