= Henryk Minkiewicz =

Polish politician and general (1880–1940)

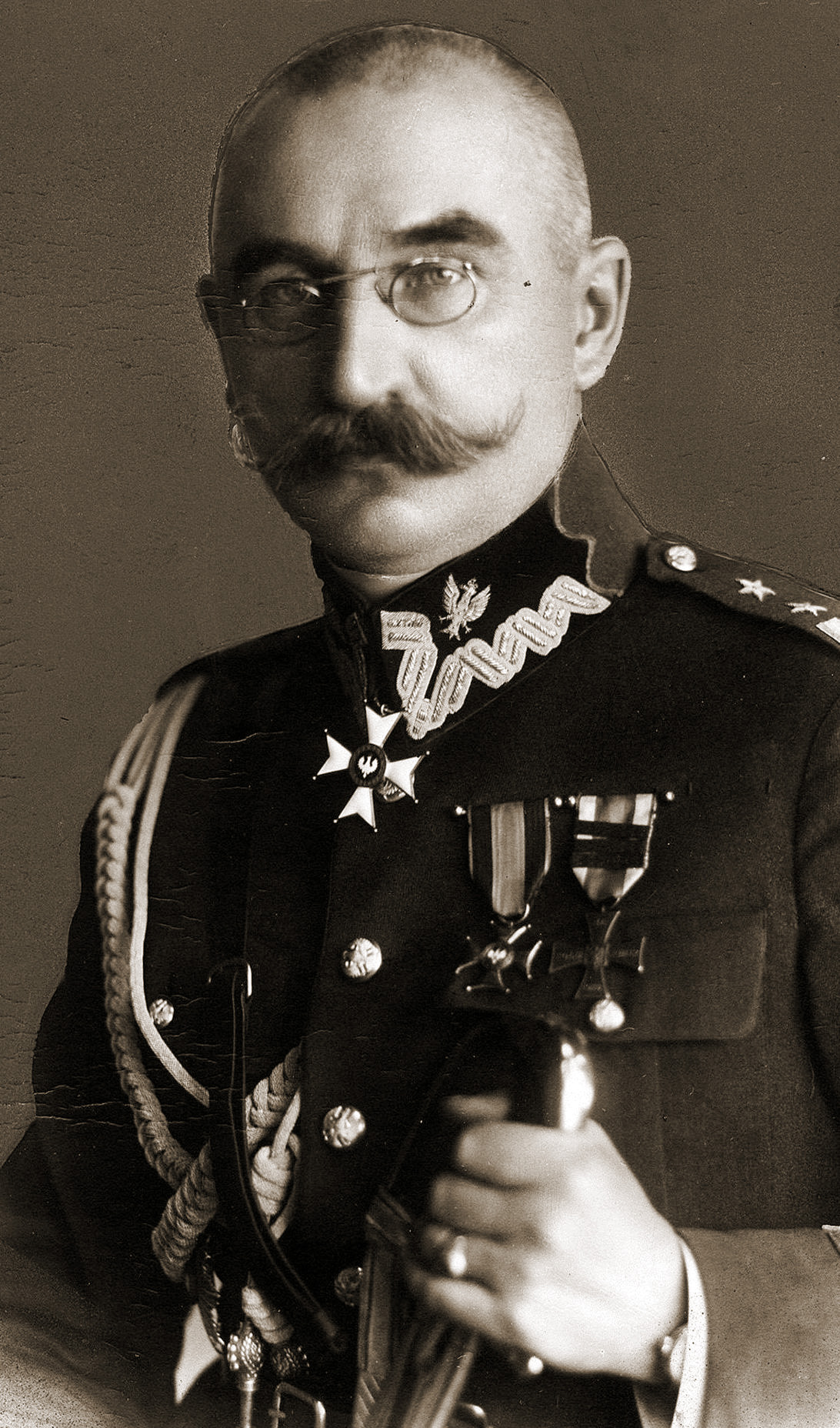
- Born: 19 January 1880; Suwałki
- Died: 9 April 1940 (aged 60); Katyn, Soviet Union
- Military career
- Allegiance: Poland
- Rank: Generał dywizji (Major general)

Henryk Minkiewicz (19 January 1880 – 9 April 1940) was a Polish socialist politician and a general of the Polish Army. Former commander of the Border Defence Corps, he was among the Polish officers murdered in the Katyń massacre.

== Life ==
Henryk Minkiewicz was born on 19 January 1880 in Suwałki, then in the Russian Empire in to the family of a tax official. His older brother was the biologist Romuald. After graduating from Marijampolė Gymnasium, he was admitted to the Imperial University of Sankt Petersburg, where he studied biology and geography. However, in 1898 he became a member of the Polish Socialist Party (PPS) and in 1902 he had to flee to Kraków, then in Austro-Hungarian Galicia, in order to avoid arrest by the Okhrana. There he joined the Medical Faculty of the Jagiellonian University and, simultaneously, studied painting at the Academy of Fine Arts.

In 1904 he finally left the studies and devoted himself entirely to politics. A close friend of Józef Piłsudski, Minkiewicz entered the Central Committee of the PPS. He was also an active member of various paramilitary organizations, including the Organizacja Bojowa of the PPS-Revolutionary Faction, the Związek Walki Czynnej and the Związek Strzelecki. During his duty in terrorist Armed Organization, in 1909, together with Kazimierz Pużak Minkiewicz was in the execution squad to murder the Tsarist secret police agent and provocateur Edmund Taranowicz.

== Fight for independence ==
After the outbreak of World War I, Minkiewicz joined the 2nd Brigade of the Polish Legions. Initially in the rank of porucznik and a commanding officer of a company, with time he was promoted to the rank of Lt. Colonel and became the commanding officer of the 3rd Infantry Regiment. During the battle of Kostiuchówka, on 6 July 1916 he was wounded in action and taken prisoner by the Russians. Officially a Russian citizen serving in enemy formations, he risked being executed for high treason. However, Minkiewicz managed to escape captivity and, after the Oath Crisis of 1917, joined the Polnische Wehrmacht, where he was promoted to the rank of Colonel. A commander of an infantry brigade and then the garrison of Warsaw, in November 1918 he headed the action of disarmament of soldiers of the Central Powers in the city.

Joining the Polish Army as one of the first high-ranking officers, he initially served as a commander of an Operational Group during the Polish-Ukrainian War. Promoted to the rank of generał brygady on 1 July 1919, he became the commanding officer of the Polish 2nd Legions Infantry Division, with which he fought in the Polish-Bolshevik War. Soon before the victorious battle of Warsaw, on 25 July 1920, he became the deputy military governor of Warsaw and deputy commander of Franciszek Latinik's 1st Army.

After the war, in 1924 he was promoted to the rank of generał dywizji and became the first commanding officer of the newly formed Border Defence Corps. Although quite successful as its commander, he became conflicted with Józef Piłsudski and on 7 May 1929 he was dismissed. Although officially in active service, he was left without assignment and settled in a small villa in the village of Jamno near Brześć Litewski (modern Brest, Belarus). In 1934 he was officially retired.

== Katyn ==
During the Polish Defensive War of 1939, his wife Maria née Markowska was killed by Soviet bombardment. Soon afterwards Minkiewicz was arrested by the NKVD and imprisoned in Kozielsk concentration camp.

As one of the highest-ranking officers in Soviet captivity, he served as the representative of all the inmates. On 7 April 1940, together with the fourth transport of Polish officers, he was transported to the Katyn woods and murdered, probably on 9 April 1940, aged sixty. Among the Katyn victims were 14 Polish generals including Leon Billewicz, Bronisław Bohaterewicz, Xawery Czernicki (admiral), Stanisław Haller, Aleksander Kowalewski, Alojzy Wir-Konas, Kazimierz Orlik-Łukoski, Konstanty Plisowski, Rudolf Prich (murdered in Lviv), Franciszek Sikorski, Leonard Skierski, Piotr Skuratowicz, and Mieczysław Smorawiński.

== Awards and decorations ==
- Silver Cross of Virtuti Militari (1921)
- Commander's Cross with Star of the Order of Polonia Restituta (10 November 1927)
- Commander's Cross of the Order of Polonia Restituta (9 November 1926)
- Cross of Independence (24 October 1931)
- Cross of Valour (four times)
- Gold Cross of Merit (10 June 1939)
