= Leonard Skierski =

Polish divisional general (1866–1940)

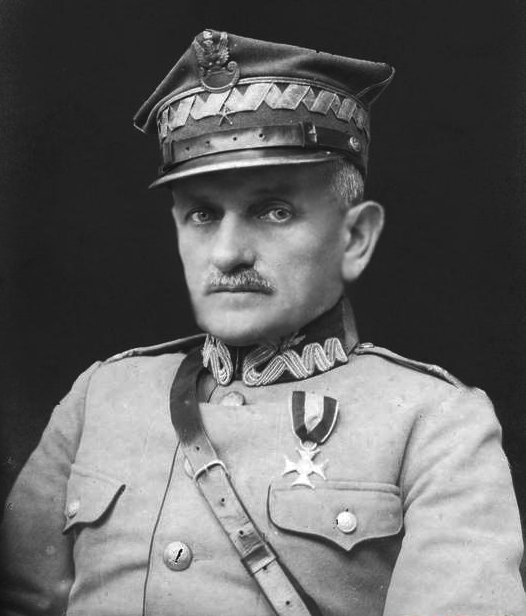
- Born: 26 April 1866; Stopnica, Congress Poland, Russian Empire
- Died: 1940 (aged 73–74); Katyn, Russian SFSR, Soviet Union
- Military career
- Allegiance: Russian Empire (1887–1917); Second Polish Republic (1917–1939)
- Branch: Imperial Russian Army; Polish Army
- Service years: 1887–1939
- Rank: General of Division
- Conflicts: First World War; Polish–Ukrainian War; Polish–Soviet War; Second World War
- Awards: Order of Virtuti Militari; Cross of Valour (4 times)

Leonard Wilhelm Skierski (26 April 1866 – spring 1940) was a Polish military officer. He was a general of the Imperial Russian Army and then served in the Polish Army. He fought in World War I and in the Polish–Soviet War. He is a victim of the Katyn massacre of 1940 and was murdered by the NKVD in Kharkov in the Ukrainian Soviet Socialist Republic. He is one of fourteen Polish generals and one of the oldest military commanders to be a victim of the Katyn massacre.

== Imperial Russian Army and World War I ==
Leonard Wilhelm Skierski was born in Stopnica near Kielce in Russian-ruled Congress Poland, into an old Polish aristocratic Calvinist family of Puchała coat of arms. His parents were Henryk Skierski and Helena née Hassman. His younger brother Stefan Skierski became the superintendent (bishop) of the Polish Reformed Church.

Early in his youth Skierski graduated from a philological school in Kielce and joined the Cadet Corps in Voronezh. As a Protestant, Skierski was not a subject to severe laws concerning Polish Catholics serving in the Russian Army and was able to advance there. On 1 September 1884, he joined the Mikhailov's College of Artillery in Saint Petersburg. In 1887, he graduated with the rank of second lieutenant (leytenant) and started his service in the 3rd Guards Artillery Brigade. He quickly rose through the ranks and ended up as a colonel (from 1906), leading an artillery command.

With his unit he took part in the opening stages of World War I. Already in February 1915, he was promoted to the rank of major general and at that time he became the highest-ranking Pole in Russian armed forces. He continued his service in various posts. From May 1917, he served as inspector of artillery of the Russian 5th Corps. Following the outbreak of the Russian Revolution, Skierski created the Society of Polish Soldiers of the 5th Corps.

He was arrested by the Bolsheviks, but managed to escape to Ukraine, where he joined the Polish II Corps in Russia. After Austria-Hungary surrounded most of the Polish Corps and disarmed it, Skierski evaded imprisonment again and fled to the countryside, where he took part in partisan operations against the Red Army. In 1919, he crossed to the Polish-held territory.

== Independent Poland ==
On 15 May 1919, Skierski joined the Polish Army. As the Polish armed forces lacked high-ranking officers, he was instantly promoted to the rank of lieutenant general (Polish: generał porucznik). On 30 May, Skierski was assigned to the 7th Infantry Division stationed in Silesia during the Silesian Uprisings; the unit saw no combat. After the cessation of hostilities on that front, on 10 August Skierski became commander of the 1st Rifle Division of General Józef Haller's Blue Army. His formation took part in heavy fighting in Volhynia during the final stages of the Polish–Ukrainian War. On 15 September 1919, the division was fully integrated with the Polish command system and renamed to 13th Infantry Division.

Early in his Polish Army service, Skierski became known as a skilled and flexible commander of infantry units; he was also highly popular among his troops. Because of that, Polish Commander-in-chief Józef Piłsudski used Skierski in important front sectors of the Polish–Soviet War. In December 1919, Skierski was withdrawn from the front and assigned to the 4th Infantry Division. In the spring of 1920, his unit took part in the Kiev offensive, in which the Polish forces reached the city of Kiev. From 21 May, Skierski was assigned the command over a separate Operational Group (Corps), within General Stanisław Szeptycki's Northeastern Front.

On 7 July, in the wake of a Soviet offensive, Skierski became commander of the 4th Army. He managed to withdraw the army under heavy pressure from numerically superior enemy and regroup it. They took part in the Battle of Warsaw in mid-August. The 4th Army, even though its units had been in frontline service for months, became the spearhead of the Polish counter-offensive from the area of the lower Wieprz River. In a matter of weeks, Skierski's troops managed to push the enemy back and reach the line of the Sluch River.

In October 1920, a ceasefire agreement was signed between Poland and Soviet Russia. Following the army demobilisation, Skierski had remained in active service and became inspector of the 3rd Army Inspectorate in Toruń. He was seen by Piłsudski as one of the most skilled Polish officers. In May 1926, Skierski supported Piłsudski's military coup and was arrested by the government forces. In 1927, he was attached to the Warsaw-based General Inspectorate of the Armed Forces. He functioned in the circle of Piłsudski's close collaborators. On 31 December 1931, he was promoted to the rank of divisional general and retired from active service.

== Death in Kharkov (part of the Katyn massacre) ==
After the Soviet invasion of Poland in 1939, despite having been retired, Skierski was taken prisoner of War together with thousands of other Polish military and police personnel. He was held in the special NKVD interrogation camp for Polish PoWs in Starobelsk. In spring 1940 he was shot by NKVD functionaries in Kharkov and buried in one of the unnamed mass graves in Piatykhatky (nowadays part of Kharkiv). Poland could establish a cemetery for the victims of the Katyn massacre murdered in Kharkov there only in 2000. It was officially inaugurated on 17 June 2000 and is called the Cemetery of the Victims of Totalitarianism (as also victims other than Poles murdered in the Katyn massacre rest there).

Among the victims of the Katyn massacre were 14 Polish generals. Apart from Skierski, eight others were also murdered in Kharkov, namely: Leon Billewicz, Stanisław Haller, Aleksander Kowalewski, Kazimierz Łukoski, Konstanty Plisowski, Franciszek Sikorski, Alojzy Wir-Konas, Piotr Skuratowicz. Four were murdered in Katyn, namely: Bronisław Bohaterewicz, Xawery Czernicki (admiral), Henryk Minkiewicz, Mieczysław Smorawiński; and one, Rudolf Prich, is among the victims from the so-called Ukrainian Katyn List.

== See also ==
- Battle of the Berezina (1920)

== Notes and references ==
- Stawecki, Piotr (1994). Słownik biograficzny generałów Wojska Polskiego 1918-1939 (in Polish). Warsaw: Bellona. p. 415. ISBN 83-11-08262-6.
