= Rudolf Prich =

Polish general (1881–1940)

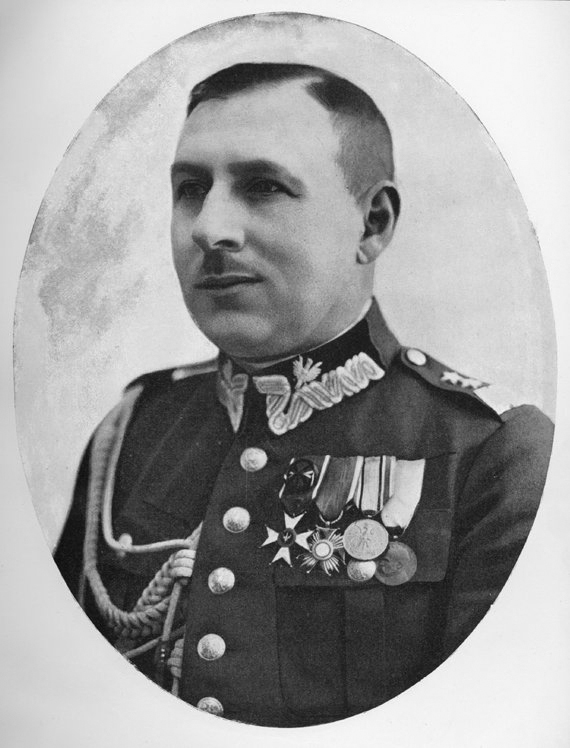
- Born: 6 August 1881; Opava, Austrian Silesia, Austria-Hungary
- Died: 1940 (aged 58–59); Russian SFSR, USSR
- Military career
- Allegiance: Poland
- Branch: Austro-Hungarian Army; Polish Army
- Service years: 1902–1935; 1939–1940
- Rank: Major General
- Conflicts: World War I Polish–Soviet War; 1939 Defensive War
- Awards: Polonia Restituta (Officer's Cross); Gold Cross of Merit; Commemorative Medal for the War of 1919-1921; Medal Dziesięciolecia Odzyskanej Niepodległości

Rudolf Prich (6 August 1881 – 1940) was a Polish military officer and a major general (pol. generał dywizji) of the Polish Army. He was among the Polish officers who were murdered by the Soviet Union during the Katyń massacre.

== Life ==
Prich was born in 1881 in Opava, Austrian Silesia. During his youth, he joined the Austro-Hungarian Army, where he served with distinction during the Great War. In April 1919, he returned to Poland and joined the Polish Army. During the opening stages of the Polish-Bolshevik War between December 1919 and April 1920, he served as the head of the 1st Detachment of the General Staff, responsible for organization and mobilization of forces. Between April 1920 and 1922 in the Polish ministry of military affairs, after the Peace of Riga he remained in the army.

In 1923, after a year of service at the post of commanding officer of the 26th Infantry Division, he was promoted to the rank of generał brygady. After the May Coup d'État of 1926, he was sent to the Centre for Artillery Training in Toruń, where he served as one of the professors and a specialist in anti-air artillery. Promoted to the rank of generał dywizji in 1928, he retired from active service in 1935.

== The 1939 invasion of Poland ==
After the outbreak of the Polish Defensive War, he returned to duty and on 11 September, was made the commander of all the Polish forces defending the area of Lwów. He held that post until relieved on 16 September, and then took part in the battle of Lwów as a commander of one of the areas of defence of the besieged city. After the capitulation of the Polish forces had been negotiated on 22 September 1939, Prich was to be released home along with other reserve and retired officers, which was a lie.

=== Katyn ===
Contrary to the terms of the capitulation he was arrested by the NKVD and held in various prisons in the city. He was murdered in the spring of 1940, aged fifty-eight, during the Katyń massacre. Among the Katyn victims were 14 Polish generals including Leon Billewicz, Bronisław Bohaterewicz, Xawery Czernicki (admiral), Stanisław Haller, Aleksander Kowalewski, Henryk Minkiewicz, Kazimierz Orlik-Łukoski, Konstanty Plisowski, Alojzy Wir-Konas, Franciszek Sikorski, Leonard Skierski, Piotr Skuratowicz, and Mieczysław Smorawiński.

== Bibliography ==
- Piotr Stawecki, Słownik biograficzny generałów Wojska Polskiego 1918-1939, Warszawa 1994, s. 261, ISBN 83-11-08262-6
