= Mieczysław Smorawiński =

Polish brigadier general (1893–1940)

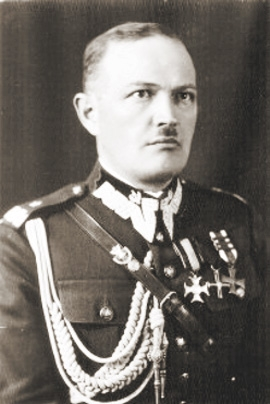
- Born: 25 December 1893; Kalisz, Russian Empire (now Poland)
- Died: 1940 (aged 46–47); Katyn, Soviet Union (now Smolensk Oblast, Russia)
- Military career
- Allegiance: Poland
- Service years: 1914 - 1940
- Rank: Generał brygady
- Commands: 6th Infantry Division
- Conflicts: Great War, Polish-Ukrainian War, Polish-Bolshevik War, Invasion of Poland (1939)
- Awards: Virtuti Militari Krzyz Niepodleglosci Polonia Restituta III Class Cross of the Valorous, 4 times Krzyz Zaslugi

Brigadier General Mieczysław Makary Smorawiński (1893–1940), was a Polish military commander and officer of the Polish Army. He was one of the Polish generals identified by forensic scientists of the Katyn Commission as the victim of the Soviet Katyn massacre of 1940.

Mieczysław Makary Smorawiński was born on 25 December 1893 in Kalisz, then in Russian Empire. There he graduated from a local primary school and then a Russian language trade school. Early in his youth he joined the Zarzewie resistance organization and became one of its leaders in Kalisz. Denunciated, in 1911 he was arrested and sentenced to 6 months in prison in Ekaterinoslav (modern Dnipro in Ukraine). After finishing his term he emigrated to Lwów (modern Lviv) in Austro-Hungarian Galicia, where in 1912 he passed his matura exam and joined the Faculty of Chemistry of the Lwów School of Technology. There he also joined the Drużyny Strzeleckie organization, in which he received basic military training.

== Fight for independence ==
At the outbreak of World War I he discontinued his studies and received officer's training in the Drużyny Strzeleckie. He moved to Kraków, where on 16 August 1914 he joined the Polish Legions. On 30 September his unit was dispatched to the front. He served with distinction in the II Brigade of the Legions, and held the posts of platoon, company and battalion commanding officer. After the Oath Crisis, together with many other members of the Polish Legions of Russian citizenship, he joined the 2nd Infantry Regiment of the Polish Auxiliary Corps, then from 16 February 1918 he served in the Polnische Wehrmacht. On 30 October he left the ranks of his unit and the following day he joined the Polish Army, even before Poland officially declared her independence. Until 13 July 1919 he served as a platoon commander in the 8th Legions' Infantry Regiment, and then he commanded the entire regiment during the Battle of Lwów and the Polish-Ukrainian War. After the end of hostilities and a brief period in Belarus and Lithuania, Smorawiński became the organizer and commanding officer of a newly formed 9th Legions' Infantry Regiment. He returned to his previous unit in August that year and remained its commander until October.

During the Polish-Bolshevik War Smorawiński distinguished himself as a commander of the 4th Legions Infantry Regiment in the ranks of the Polish 2nd Legions Infantry Division (10 November 1919 to 4 August 1920. During the Polish retreat following a successful Bolshevik offensive in Belarus, Smorawiński was promoted to the rank of lieutenant colonel and assigned to the 4th Legions Infantry Brigade as its commanding officer. In the ranks of his unit he fought in the Battle of Warsaw. Following the Bolshevik defeat, his unit continued the pursuit after the fleeing Russians, finally liberating the town of Hrubieszów. After that his unit took part in the Battle of the Niemen River and reached Lida by the end of hostilities.

After the Riga Peace Treaty, on 2 September 1921, Mieczysław Smorawiński was assigned to the 2nd Legions Infantry Division as the commander of infantry of that unit. He served at that post until 20 March 1927. Simultaneously, he graduated from the Centre for Infantry Training in Rembertów and was promoted to colonel. During the May Coup d'État of 1926, Smorawiński led a small troop of his men from Kielce in support of Józef Piłsudski's forces fighting in Warsaw. On 19 March 1927 he was assigned to the Kraków-based 6th Infantry Division as its commander. On 1 January 1928 he was promoted to the rank of Brigadier General and became the youngest General in Polish service until then. In October 1932 he was assigned to the Grodno-based Corps Area Command No. III as the deputy commander. After his successful training there, in October 1934 he became the commander of the Lublin-based Corps Area Command No. II.

== The 1939 invasion of Poland ==
Shortly before the outbreak of the Polish Defensive War of 1939 and World War II, he took part in formation of the reserve Polish 39th Infantry Division and the supply bases of the Polish 3rd Legions Infantry Division. Until 14 September 1939 he remained in Lublin, after which he was evacuated with a small troop to Kowel (modern Kovil) and then to Włodzimierz Wołyński, in what is now Ukraine. He was to organize new reserve units for the Polish-German front there, but his mission became unachievable after the Soviet entry into the war on the side of Nazi Germany on 17 September. The fast pace of the Soviet advance into Poland resulted in Smorawiński's order not to fight with the Red Army. Instead, on 18 September he demobilized most of ordinary soldiers and NCO's under his command, and led a group officers towards Hungarian or Romanian borders. Overran by the Soviet forces, he negotiated an agreement allowing the Polish unit to march towards Bug River and join the Polish units still fighting against the Germans. However, on 20 September the group was again halted, this time by the NKVD who arrested all of the officers and took them into captivity.

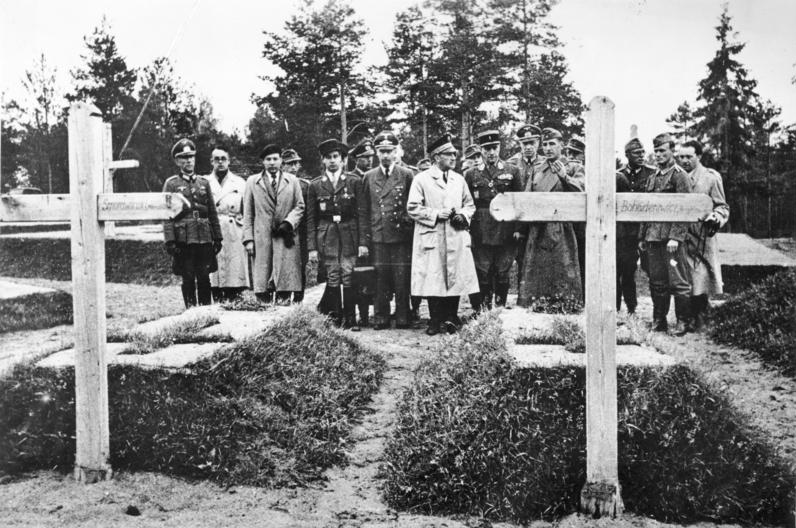
Secretary of State of the Vichy regime Fernand de Brinon 1943 in Katyn at the graves of Mieczysław Smorawiński and Bronisław Bohaterewicz

=== Katyn ===
After a short stay in various Soviet prisons and POW camps, at the end of 1939 he was transferred to the NKVD Special Camp in Kozelsk. Smorawiński left the camp on 7 April 1940. Together with most of the Polish officers imprisoned there he was executed by the NKVD at Katyn, in the spring of 1940, aged forty-six, in what became known as the Katyn massacre. During the exhumation of 1943 his body was exhumed and identified, as one of the Polish generals to be identified. Among the Katyn victims were 14 Polish generals including Leon Billewicz, Bronisław Bohaterewicz, Xawery Czernicki (admiral), Stanisław Haller, Aleksander Kowalewski, Henryk Minkiewicz, Kazimierz Orlik-Łukoski, Konstanty Plisowski, Rudolf Prich (murdered in Lviv), Franciszek Sikorski, Leonard Skierski, Piotr Skuratowicz, and Alojzy Wir-Konas.

== Honours and awards ==
- Military Merit Medal
- Silver Cross of the Virtuti Militari
- Cross of Independence
- Cross of Valour (four times)
- Gold Cross of Merit
