= Polish prisoners of war in the Soviet Union after 1939 =

As a result of the Soviet invasion of Poland in 1939, hundreds of thousands of Polish soldiers became prisoners of war. Many of them were executed; 22,000 Polish military personnel and civilians perished in the Katyn massacre alone.

== Soviet invasion of Poland ==
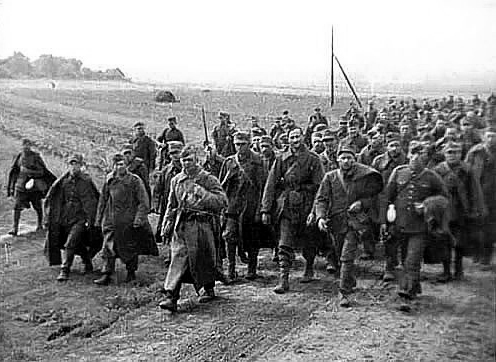
Polish prisoners of war captured by the Red Army during the Soviet invasion of Poland

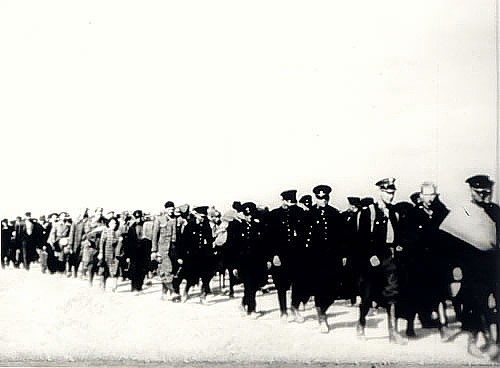
Polish policemen and civilians captured by the Red Army after the Soviet invasion of Poland

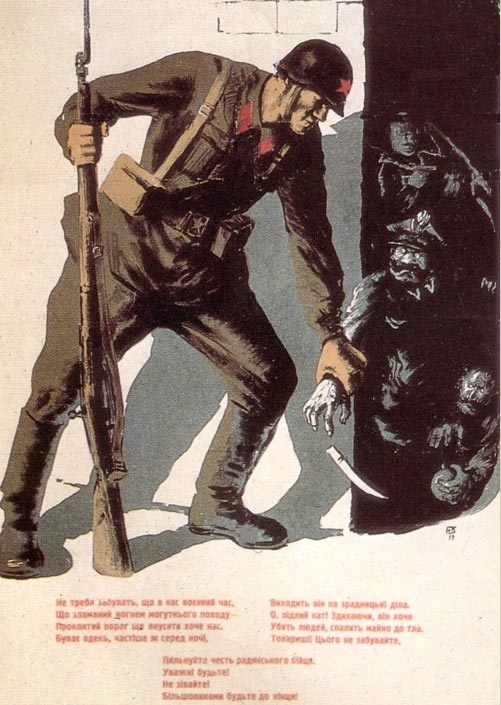
A Soviet propaganda poster urging the civilians to beware of spies; in this case a man in the shadows wearing Polish officers parade uniform.

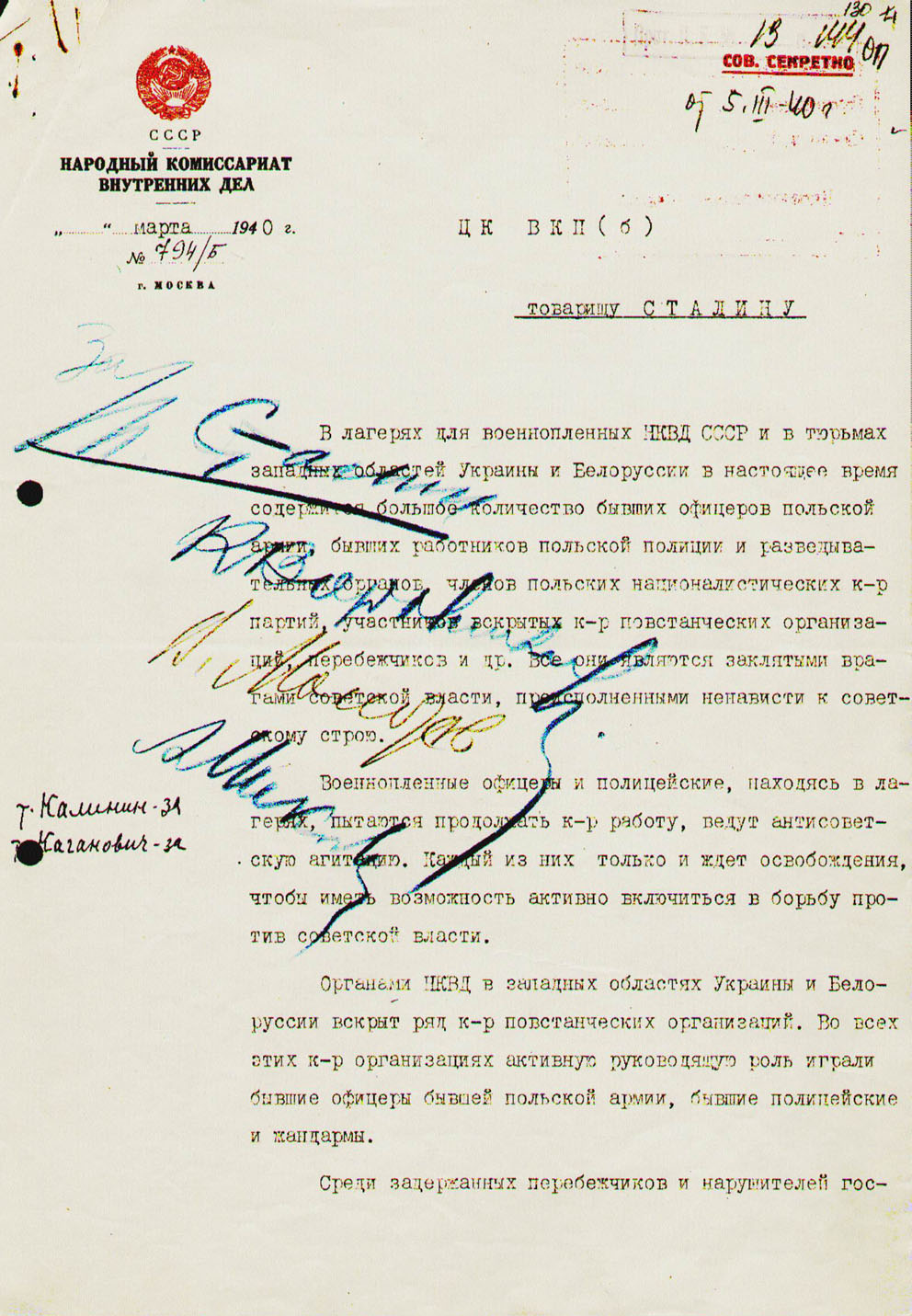
The note from Beria which was signed by members of the Soviet Politburo; it decided the fate (mass execution) of Polish officers, dated 5 March 1940

On September 17, 1939, the Red Army invaded the territory of Poland from the east. The invasion took place while Poland was already sustaining serious defeats in the wake of the German attack on the country that started on September 1, 1939. The Soviets moved to safeguard their claims in accordance with the Molotov–Ribbentrop Pact.

During the Red Army's rapid advance, about 6,000–7,000 Polish soldiers died in the fighting, Official Soviet estimate for the number of POWs taken during th campaign was 190,584 and is treated as reliable by some historians. Lower and higher estimates exist. Lower estimate has been given as around 125,000 ; according to the higher ones, 230,000–450,000 were taken prisoner—230,000 immediately after the campaign and 70,000 more when the Soviets annexed the Baltic States and assumed custody of Polish troops interned there (12,000 in Lithuania).

The Soviets often failed to honour the terms of surrender. In some cases, they promised Polish soldiers freedom after capitulation and then arrested them when they laid down their arms. Some Polish soldiers were murdered shortly after capture, like General Józef Olszyna-Wilczyński, who was taken prisoner, interrogated and shot on September 22, during the invasion itself. On September 24, the Soviets murdered forty-two staff and patients at a Polish military hospital in the village of Grabowiec near Zamość. After a tactical Polish victory at the battle of Szack on September 28, where the combined Korpus Ochrony Pogranicza (KOP) or Border Protection Corps forces, under General Wilhelm Orlik-Rueckemann, routed the Soviet 52nd Rifle Division, the Soviets executed all the Polish officers they captured. The Soviets also executed hundreds of defenders at Grodno, the exact number of those killed has not been established.

== First period (1939–1941) ==
Some Polish prisoners were freed or escaped, but 125,000 found themselves incarcerated in prison camps run by the NKVD. Of these, the Soviet authorities released 42,400 soldiers (mostly soldiers of Ukrainian and Belarusian ethnicity serving in the Polish army who lived in the former Polish territories now annexed by the Soviet Union) in October. The 43,000 soldiers born in West Poland, then under German control, were transferred to the Germans; in turn the Soviets received 13,575 Polish prisoners from the Germans.

Poland and the Soviet Union never officially declared war on each other in 1939; the Soviets effectively broke off diplomatic relations when they withdrew recognition of the Polish government at the start of the invasion. The Soviets regarded captured Polish military personnel not as prisoners-of-war, but as counter-revolutionaries resisting the legal Soviet reclamation of western Ukraine and West Belarus. The USSR refused to allow Red Cross supervision of prisoners - on the grounds that it had not signed the 1929 Geneva Convention on the Treatment of PoWs and did not recognise the Hague Convention. The Soviet military handed the Polish prisoners over to the Narodnyy komissariat vnutrennikh del (People's Commissariat of Internal Affairs, better known as the NKVD or secret police), they received sentences under clauses in the Soviet penal code relating to crimes including treason and counter-revolution, and were not considered subject to the "Regulations for the Treatment of Prisoners of War" approved by the Soviet Council of Ministers.

As early as September 19, 1939, the People's Commissar for Internal Affairs and First Rank Commissar of State Security, Lavrenty Beria, ordered the NKVD to create the Administration for Affairs of Prisoners of War and Internees to manage Polish prisoners. The NKVD took custody of Polish prisoners from the Red Army and proceeded to organize a network of reception centers and transit camps and to arrange rail transport to prisoner-of-war camps in the western USSR. The camps were located at Jukhnovo (Babynino rail station), Yuzhe (Talitsy), Kozelsk, Kozelshchyna, Oranki, Ostashkov (Stolbnyi Island on Seliger Lake near Ostashkov), Tyotkino rail station (56 mi/90 km from Putyvl), Starobielsk, Vologda (Zaenikevo rail station) and Gryazovets.

Kozelsk and Starobielsk held mainly military officers, while Ostashkov was used mainly for Boy Scouts, gendarmes, police and prison officers. Inmates at these camps were not exclusively military officers or members of the other groups mentioned, they also included members of the Polish intelligentsia. The approximate distribution of men throughout the camps was as follows:

- Kozelsk, 5,000
- Ostashkov, 6,570
- Starobelsk (Katyn forest), 4,000

They totalled 15,570 men.

According to a report from 19 November 1939, the NKVD had about 40,000 Polish POWs: about 8,000-8,500 officers and warrant officers, 6,000–6,500 police officers and 25,000 soldiers and NCOs who were still being held as POWs. In December, a wave of arrests took into custody some Polish officers who were not yet imprisoned; Ivan Serov reported to Lavrentiy Beria on 3 December that "in all, 1,057 former officers of the Polish Army had been arrested". The 25,000 soldiers and non-commissioned officers were assigned to forced labor (road construction, heavy metallurgy).

Once at the camps, from October 1939 to February 1940, the Poles were subjected to lengthy interrogations and constant political agitation by NKVD officers such as Vasily Zarubin. The Soviets encouraged the Poles to believe they would be released, but the interviews were in effect a selection process to determine who would live and who would die. According to NKVD reports, the prisoners could not be induced to adopt a pro-Soviet attitude. They were declared "hardened and uncompromising enemies of Soviet authority".

On March 5, 1940, a note to Joseph Stalin from Beria saw the members of the Soviet Politburo — Stalin, Vyacheslav Molotov, Lazar Kaganovich, Mikhail Kalinin, Kliment Voroshilov, Anastas Mikoyan and Beria — signed an order for the execution of "nationalists and counter-revolutionaries" kept at camps and prisons in western Ukraine and Belarus. This execution became known as the Katyn massacre, where 22,000 perished

== Second period (1941–1944) ==
Diplomatic relations were, however, re-established in 1941 after the German invasion of the Soviet Union forced Joseph Stalin to look for allies. Thus the military agreement from August 14 and subsequent Sikorski–Mayski Agreement from August 17, 1941, resulted in Stalin agreeing to declare the Molotov–Ribbentrop Pact in relation to Poland null and void, and release tens of thousands of Polish prisoners-of-war held in Soviet camps. Pursuant to an agreement between the Polish government-in-exile and Stalin, the Soviets granted "amnesty" to many Polish citizens, from whom a military force was formed. Stalin also agreed that this military force would be subordinate to the Polish government-in-exile. This force was known as the Anders Army. From 1943 Poles were recruited into the Berling Army.

== Third period (after 1944) ==
The third group of Polish prisoners were members of Polish resistance organizations (Armia Krajowa, or 'cursed soldiers') loyal to the Polish government-in-exile and seen by the Soviets as a threat to their establishment of a power base in Poland. Relatively few were sent to the Soviet Union (although there were notable exceptions, see Trial of the Sixteen); most were transferred to the Polish communist security forces and prisons, or enlisted in the Berling Army.

== Polish generals killed by the Soviets in 1939–1945 ==
- Bronisław Babiański - Major General in the Polish Army of the Second Polish Republic. In September 1939, when the German Army and the Soviet Army invaded Poland, he moved to Grodno, where he was captured by the NKVD a month later. He has been missing since then, presumably killed by the NKVD.
- Leon Billewicz - Brigadier General, seized by the Soviets in Żurawno nearby Stryi on 19 September 1939 along with the hastily organized Polish units heading toward Polish-Hungarian border. He was detained in Starobielsk and executed in Kharkiv.
- Bronisław Bohaterewicz - Brigadier General, he had retired from the Army before 1939, nevertheless was arrested in September 1939 and deported to the camp in Kozielsk and subsequently murdered in the Katyń massacre. He was one of only two generals identified during exhumation in 1943.
- Alexandre Chkheidze - Brigadier General, was detained by the NKVD in Lviv, September 1939, as the 'enemy of people'. He was replaced to Kiev in June 1940 and accused of list of 'crimes'. The last trace of the general is receipt put by the commander of convoy in December 1940. The general was likely shot by a firing squad in Moscow in 1941.
- Xawery Czernicki - Rear Admiral, he shared common lot of Polish officers detained by the Soviets. Having crossed thresholds of Ostaszków, Starobielsk, Kozielsk Soviet camp, he was eventually murdered in the Katyń massacre.
- Kazimierz Dzierżanowski - Lieutenant General, captured by the NKVD in Lviv, in October 1939, afterwards relocated to Kiev in 1940. His fate is unknown, but he is suspected to have died of exhaustion in the Kiev prison.
- Stanisław Haller de Hallenburg - Lieutenant General, arrested in 1939 and imprisoned in Starobielsk. In 1941, when Władysław Sikorski had issued the order to form Polish Army in the Soviet Union after the outbreak of war between Germany and the Soviet Union, Stanisław Haller was to be appointed the Commander in Chief of that army. Oblivious to Sikorski, Haller had been dead since 1940, when he fell victim to the Katyń massacre.
- Kazimierz Horoszkiewicz - nominal Lieutenant General in the Polish Army of the Second Polish Republic, in September 1939, eluding the Germans he arrived to Lviv, at that time already under the Soviet occupation. Having been sent to Siberia, Horoszkiewicz had died in Tobolsk on his way back to the west, to newly formed Polish units in the Soviet Union in 1942.
- Albin Jasiński - Brigadier General, organized Polish Self-Defence units in Drohiczyn against the Soviet oppression in 1939. He was detained by the NKVD, and died in 1940 during tortures inflicted by the NKVD interrogators.
- Aleksander Walenty Jasiński - Brigadier General, he disappeared after the Soviets had entered Lviv. His fate has been unknown since.
- Marian Jasiński - nominal Brigadier General, he has been lost from the Soviet invasion, likely killed by the Soviets.
- Adolf Karol Jastrzębski - Brigadier General, imprisoned by the Soviets, sent to gulag in Vologda, died of hard labour, exhaustion and hunger.
- Władysław Jędrzejewski - Lieutenant General, he was organizing the Self-Defence units in Lviv, when the Soviet army entered the city. He was executed in 1940 by the NKVD.
- Władysław Jung - Lieutenant General, the Soviet aggression caught him in Lviv. He made failed attempt to cross the German-Soviet demarcation line in 1939. Kept in prison on severe cold, he died of gangrene.
- Juliusz Klemens Kolmer - Brigadier General, arrested by NKVD in Lviv, 1940. He was presumably killed by the Soviets.
- Aleksander Kowalewski (general) - Brigadier General, he prepared operation group in Podolia during September Campaign in 1939. When the news of the Soviet invasion had reached him, General Kowalewski set off on the southeastern direction, where he clashed with approaching Soviet army. In the meantime, General of the Armies announced the directive not to engage Soviets unless provoked. General Kowalewski followed the order and capitulated to Soviets. Imprisoned and relocated to Starobielsk, murdered in Kharkiv in 1940.
- Szymon Kurz - Brigadier General, arrested in November 1939 by the NKVD. Executed in the spring of 1940.
- Kazimierz Orlik-Łukoski - Major General, was captured during the German–Soviet invasion and later turned over to the NKVD. He was imprisoned in Starobielsk, and later killed in the Katyń massacre.

== See also ==
- Polish prisoners and internees in Soviet Russia and Lithuania (1919–1921)
- War crimes in occupied Poland during World War II
- Sybiraks
- Camps for Russian prisoners and internees in Poland (1919–1924)
