= Piotr Skuratowicz =

Polish general (1891–1940)

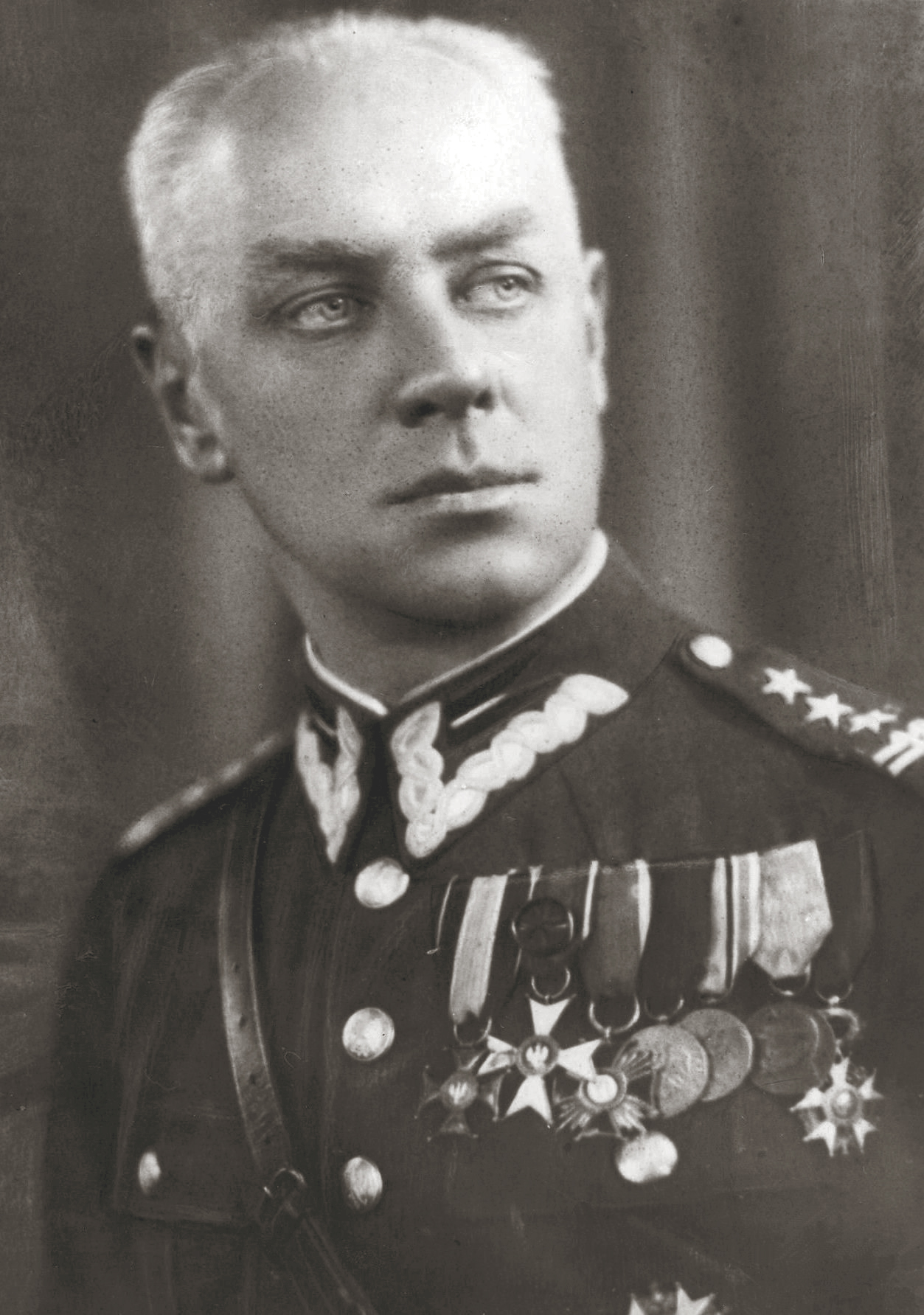
- Born: 1 August 1891; Babruysk
- Died: April/May 1940; Kharkiv
- Military career
- Allegiance: Poland
- Rank: Major general
- Commands: 9th Infantry Division; Dubno Operational Group
- Conflicts: World War I; Polish–Soviet War; World War II; Invasion of Poland
- Awards: Virtuti Militari (5th class) Polonia Restituta (4th Class) Cross of Merit (1st Class) Cross of Independence Chevalier, Legion of Honour Medal Pamiątkowy za Wojnę 1918-1921

Piotr Skuratowicz (1 August 1891 – 1940) was a Polish military commander and a General of the Polish Army. A renowned cavalryman, a victim of the Katyn massacre of 1940 murdered by the NKVD in Kharkov in the Ukrainian Soviet Socialist Republic.

Piotr Marian Skuratowicz was born 1891 in Minsk, Russian Empire. He joined the Imperial Russian Army, where he received officer's training. During World War I he was drafted into the army and served with distinction on the Eastern Front. In 1917 he joined the 1st Polish Corps being formed in Russia, he was sent to Murmansk and then to France, where he joined Gen. Józef Haller's Blue Army. In June 1919 he returned with his unit to the re-established Poland.

== Fight for independence ==
During the Polish-Bolshevik War he distinguished himself as a skilled cavalry commander and in 1920 he was made the commanding officer of the 6th Mounted Rifle Regiment. After the war he remained in the army and, following 1932, became the commander of Ostrołęka-based XII Cavalry Brigade. In 1937 came the peak of his career, when he was appointed to the Polish Ministry of Military Affairs as the chief of Cavalry Department. Throughout the entire interbellum period (after 1922) he was also the commander of Grudziądz-based Centre for Cavalry Training. Promoted to the rank of General in the spring of 1939, he became the commanding officer of the Dubno Operational Group, formed of various march battalions of cavalry units. With that unit he was to reinforce the Polish troops fighting with the Germans after the outbreak of the Invasion of Poland. However, after the Soviet invasion of Poland of September 17, his post was taken by Stefan Hanka-Kulesza and the unit was destroyed by the Red Army soon afterwards.

=== Death in Kharkov (part of the Katyn massacre) ===
After the Soviet invasion of Poland in 1939, Skuratowicz was taken prisoner of war together with thousands of other Polish military and police personnel. He was held in the special NKVD interrogation camp for Polish PoWs in Starobelsk. He was then murdered, aged forty-eight, in the Katyń massacre of 1940, in spring 1940 in the NKVD prison in Kharkiv and buried in one of the unnamed mass graves in Piatykhatky (nowadays part of Kharkiv). Poland could establish a cemetery for the victims of the Katyn massacre murdered in Kharkov there only in 2000. It was officially inaugurated on 17 June 2000 and it is called the Cemetery of the Victims of Totalitarianism (as also victims other than Poles those killed in the Katyn massacre, rest there).

Among the victims of the Katyn massacre were 14 Polish generals. Apart from Skuratowicz, eight others were also murdered in Kharkov, namely: Leon Billewicz, Stanisław Haller, Aleksander Kowalewski, Kazimierz Łukoski, Konstanty Plisowski, Franciszek Sikorski, Leonard Skierski, Alojzy Wir-Konas. Four were murdered in Katyn, namely: Bronisław Bohaterewicz, Xawery Czernicki (admiral), Henryk Minkiewicz, Mieczysław Smorawiński; and one, Rudolf Prich, is among the victims from the so-called Ukrainian Katyn List.

== Honours and awards ==
- Silver Cross of the Virtuti Militari
- Officer's Cross of the Order of Polonia Restituta
- Gold Cross of Merit
- Medal of Independence
- Knight's Cross of the Legion of Honour (France)
