= Stanisław Haller =

Polish politician and divisional general (1872–1940)

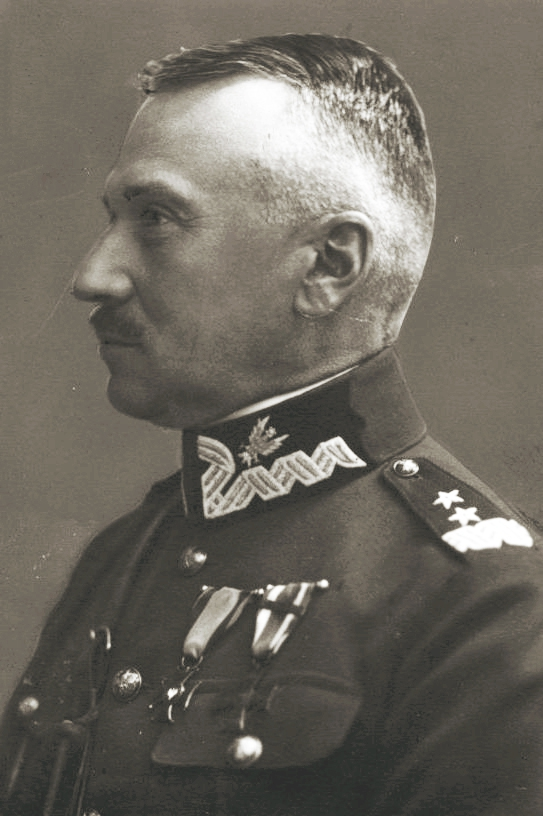

Chief of the Polish General Staff
- In office 12 May 1926 – 15 May 1926
- Preceded by: Edmund Kessler
- Succeeded by: Stanisław Burhardt-Bukacki

Personal details
- Born: 26 April 1872 Polanka Hallera, Austria-Hungary
- Died: Spring 1940 (67-68) Kharkov, Soviet Union
- Resting place: Kharkov Polish War Cemetery
- Citizenship: Polish

Military service
- Allegiance: Second Polish Republic
- Branch/service: Polish Legions Polish Armed Forces
- Years of service: 1912–1939
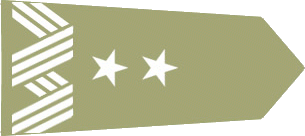
- Rank: Divisional general
- Battles/wars: First World War; Polish–Soviet War; Invasion of Poland
Haller Coat of Arms

Stanisław Haller (de Hallenburg; 26 April 1872 – Spring 1940) was a Polish politician and general who was murdered in the Katyn massacre. He was the cousin of General Józef Haller.

== Life ==
Between 1894 and 1918 Haller served in the Austro-Hungarian Army. Among other military functions, he was commandant of Fortress Kraków. In 1918 he joined the renascent Polish Army. During the Polish-Soviet War he contributed to the defeat of Budionny's army and its expulsion beyond the Bug River. In 1919–1920, 1923–25 and in May 1926 he was Chief of the Polish General Staff. After 1926 he was placed in retirement as a political opponent of the new regime headed by Józef Piłsudski.

=== Death ===
In 1939 he was arrested by the Soviets after their attack on Poland and placed in a POW camp in Starobielsk. Along with other Polish POWs, he was murdered by the NKVD in April 1940, just before his sixty-eighth birthday, in Piatykhatky near Kharkov, in what is collectively called the Katyn Massacre.

He is buried at the Polish War Cemetery in Kharkov.

== Commemorations ==
Stanisław Haller is patron of the 5th command regiment of the Kraków-based Polish 2nd Mechanized Corps.

== Honours and awards ==
- Commander's Cross of the Order of Virtuti Militari; previously awarded the Silver Cross (1921)
- Commander's Cross of the Order of Polonia Restituta
- Cross of Valour – twice
- Cross of Liberty, Class I (Estonia)
- Royal Order of St. Stephen of Hungary
- Order of St. Stanislaus

== Other high ranking Polish officers murdered in the Katyn Massacre ==
Among the victims of the Katyn Massacre were 14 Polish military leaders, including Leon Billewicz, Bronisław Bohaterewicz, Xawery Czernicki, Henryk Minkiewicz, Kazimierz Orlik-Łukoski, Konstanty Plisowski, Rudolf Prich (murdered in Lwow), Franciszek Sikorski, Leonard Skierski, Piotr Skuratowicz, Mieczysław Smorawiński, and Alojzy Wir-Konas (promoted posthumously).

== See also ==
- Prometheism
- List of Poles

== Bibliography ==
- Stalisław Haller (sic!) (1926). Naród a armja (The Nation and the Army). Kraków, Księgarnia Krakowska. p. 88.
- Andrzej Wierzbicki; Stanisław Haller; Jan Rzepecki (1984). O przewrocie majowym 1926; opinie świadków i uczestników (On the May Coup d'etat; opinions of witnesses and participants). Wydawnictwa MON. p. 164. ISBN 83-11-07122-5.
