= Bronisław Bohaterewicz =

Polish general

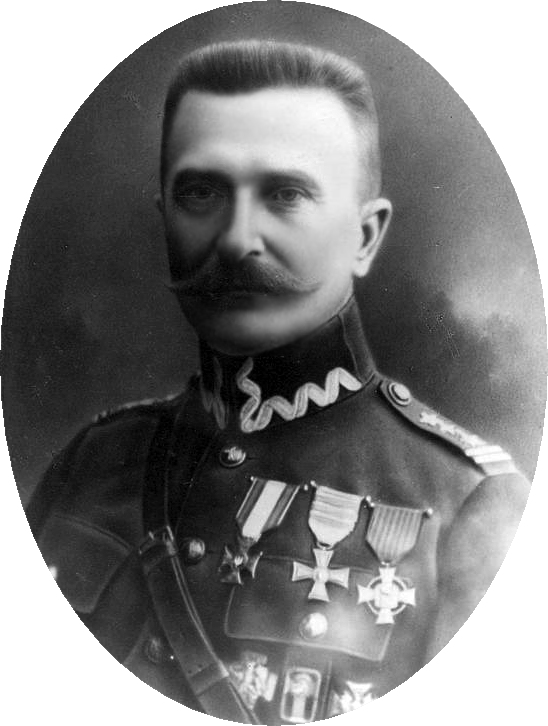
- Born: 24 February 1870; Grodno, Grodno Governorate, Russian Empire
- Died: 9 April 1940 (aged 70); Katyn, Soviet Union
- Military career
- Allegiance: Poland
- Rank: Brigadier General

Bronisław Bohaterewicz (Bohatyrewicz) of the Ostoja coat of arms (24 February 1870 – 9 April 1940) was a Polish military commander and a general of the Polish Army. Murdered during the Katyn massacre, Bohaterewicz was one of the Generals whose bodies were identified by forensic scientists of the Katyn Commission during the 1943 exhumation.

== Life ==
Ostoja

Born 24 February or 24 April 1870 (sources differ) in Grodno, in a noble family being part of the Clan of Ostoja, Bohaterewicz joined the Imperial Russian Army, where he received officers training. In September 1918 he joined the Polish Army. He started as the commanding officer of Belarusian self-defence units in Grodno during the opening stages of the Russian Civil War and then the Polish-Bolshevik War. Successful in the battle of Grodno, in 1919 he became the commander of the Polish 81st Infantry Regiment. After the war he continued his career in the army and received further training in the Higher War School in Warsaw. Between 1923 and 1926 he commanded the infantry units of the Polish 18th Infantry Division and the following year he was promoted to the rank of generał brygady and retired from active duty.

== Katyn ==
After the Polish Defensive War of 1939 Bohaterewicz was arrested by the NKVD and imprisoned in Kozelsk in the Soviet Union. He was murdered in Katyn in the spring of 1940, aged seventy, during the Katyń massacre. Among the Katyn victims were 14 Polish generals including Leon Billewicz, Xawery Czernicki (admiral), Stanisław Haller, Aleksander Kowalewski, Henryk Minkiewicz, Kazimierz Orlik-Łukoski, Konstanty Plisowski, Rudolf Prich (murdered in Lviv), Franciszek Sikorski, Leonard Skierski, Piotr Skuratowicz, Mieczysław Smorawiński and Alojzy Wir-Konas (promoted posthumously).

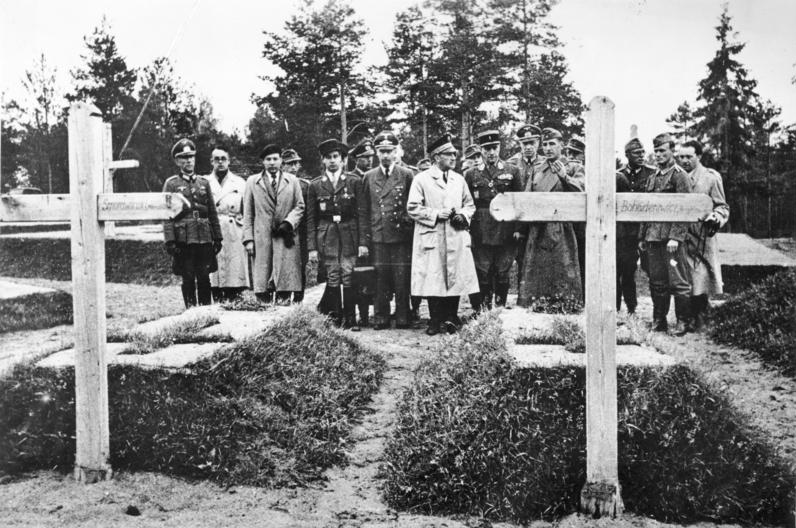
Secretary of State of the Vichy regime Fernand de Brinon 1943 in Katyn at the graves of Mieczysław Smorawiński and Bronisław Bohaterewicz

== Honours and awards ==
- Silver Cross of the Order of Virtuti Militari
- Cross of Valour - four times
- Silver Cross of Merit
- Merit Cross for Forces in Central Lithuanian

== See also ==
- Katyn
- Clan of Ostoja
- Ostoja coat of arms
- Mieczysław Smorawiński
