= Leon Billewicz =

Polish brigadier general (1870–1940)

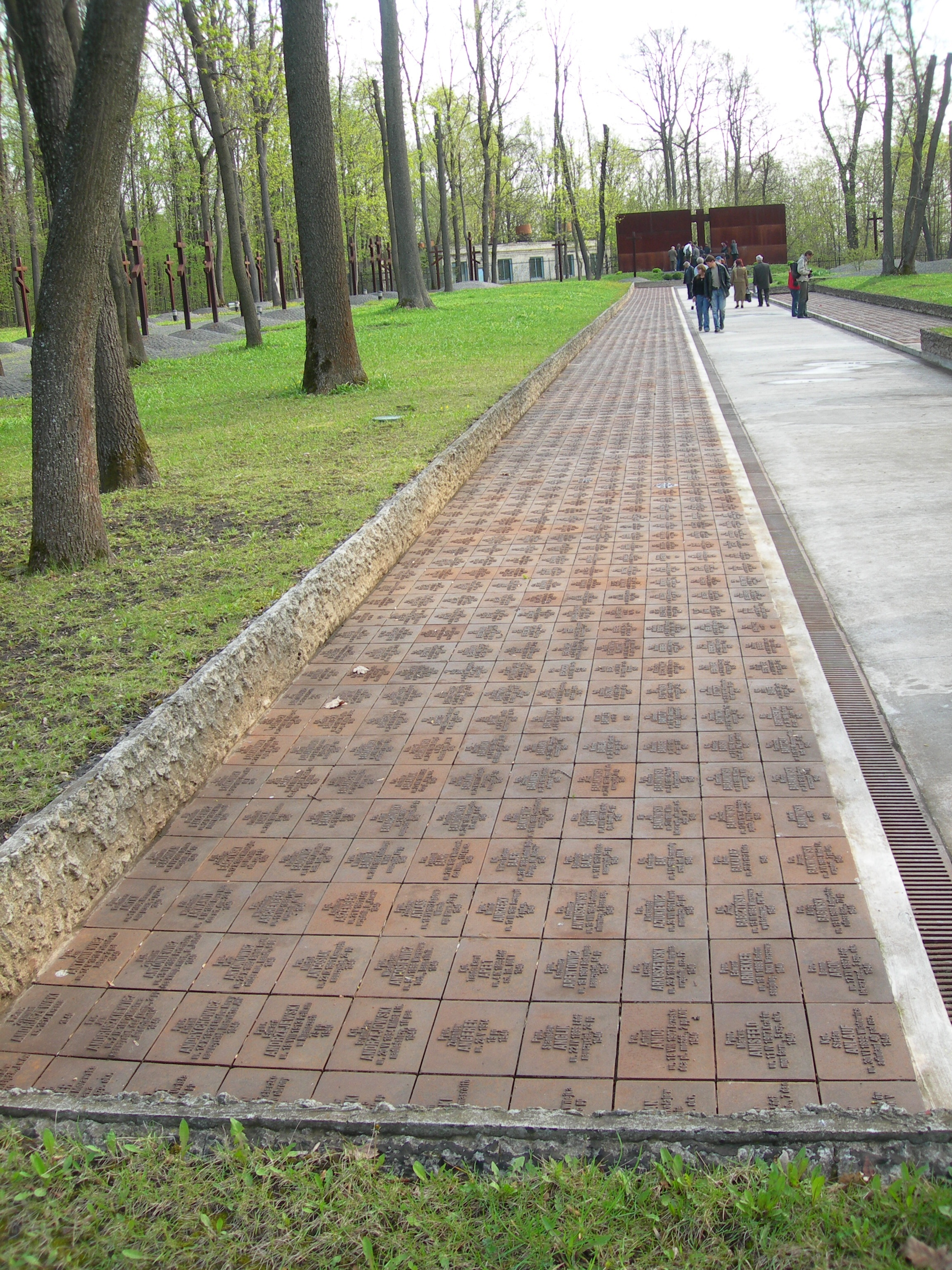
- Memorial at the Piatykhatky mass grave in Kharkiv, with plaque of General Leon Billewicz (172/272) among 3,739 names of victims of the local NKVD killing squad.
- Born: 24 February 1870; Verbichno (today Verbichne, Turiisk Raion)
- Died: April 1940 (aged 70); Kharkiv NKVD prison, Soviet Union
- Military career
- Allegiance: Poland
- Rank: Brigadier General

Leon Billewicz (April 25, 1870 in Werbiczna – April 1940) was a Polish officer and a General of the Polish Army. He was murdered during the Katyń massacre.

== Biography ==
=== Service ===
Initially serving with the Imperial Russian Army, in November 1918 he joined the Polish forces. In the Polish-Bolshevik War of 1919-1920 he commanded the Polish 13th Infantry Brigade. In 1919 he was promoted to the rank of Generał brygady (Brigadier general). After the Peace of Riga he remained in active service and, until 1927, served as a commanding officer of the Brześć Fortified Area. In April 1927, he retired from active service.

=== Katyń massacre ===
After the Invasion of Poland in 1939 he was arrested by the NKVD and imprisoned in Soviet Union. Interned in the Starobielsk concentration camp, he was murdered in Kharkiv in April 1940, at the age of seventy, during the Katyń massacre. Among the Katyn victims were 14 Polish generals including Bronisław Bohaterewicz, Xawery Czernicki (admiral), Stanisław Haller, Aleksander Kowalewski, Henryk Minkiewicz, Kazimierz Orlik-Łukoski, Konstanty Plisowski, Rudolf Prich (murdered in Lviv), Franciszek Sikorski, Leonard Skierski, Piotr Skuratowicz, Mieczysław Smorawiński and Alojzy Wir-Konas (promoted posthumously).
