= Zygmunt Łotocki =

Polish archer (1904–1940)

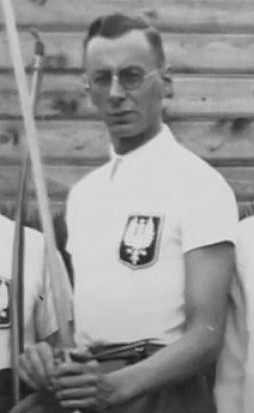

Personal information
- Full name: Zygmunt Marian Łotocki
- Nationality: Polish
- Born: 16 January 1904 Włodawa, Russian Poland
- Died: Spring 1940 (age 36) Katyn forest, Soviet Union
- Resting place: Katyn Polish War Cemetery
- Education: University of Warsaw
- Spouse: Maria Pańków-Łotocka

Sport
- Country: Poland
- Sport: Archery
Medal record
Archery
Representing Poland
Gold medal – first place	1932 Warsaw	Team

Zygmunt Marian Łotocki (16 January 1904 – Spring 1940) was a Polish archer, writer, and military officer. A victim of the Katyn massacre.

== Early life and education ==
Łotocki was born on 16 January 1904 in Włodawa, in the Russian Empire (Russian Partition of Poland). His father, Walerian, was a constructor of railway tracks in Siberia.

He studied Polonistics at the University of Warsaw. As a poet, he was a member of the Kwadryga literary group. His texts and poems were published in Skamander and Głos Literacki magazines. In the years 1936–1939, Łotocki taught Polish language at the gymnasium in Piotrków Trybunalski.

== Sports career ==
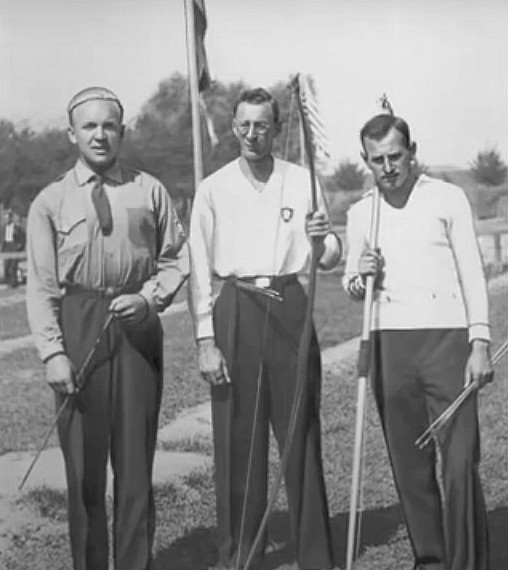
Sawicki, Łotocki, and Kosiński at the 1932 World Archery Championships

Łotocki was interested in swimming and athletics. He was one of the first people to practice archery in independent Poland. Since Spring 1928, he was the main instructor of the archery academy in Warsaw. He wrote two textbooks on archery: "Sport łuczniczy" (published in 1929) and "Łucznictwo" (1934). He propagated archery at gatherings of organisations such as the Riflemen's Association, the Female Military Training, and the Polish Scouting and Guiding Association. He influenced thousands of people to start practicing archery.

In September 1928, Łotocki gained the highest score at the archery championships of Warsaw. At the 1932 World Archery Championships, the team he was in won the gold medal. In 1934, as a member of the ZS Warszawa club, he became the archery champion of Poland. He was considered to be one of the best archers of interwar Poland, together with Michał Sawicki, Zbigniew Kosiński, and Janina Kurkowska-Spychajowa.

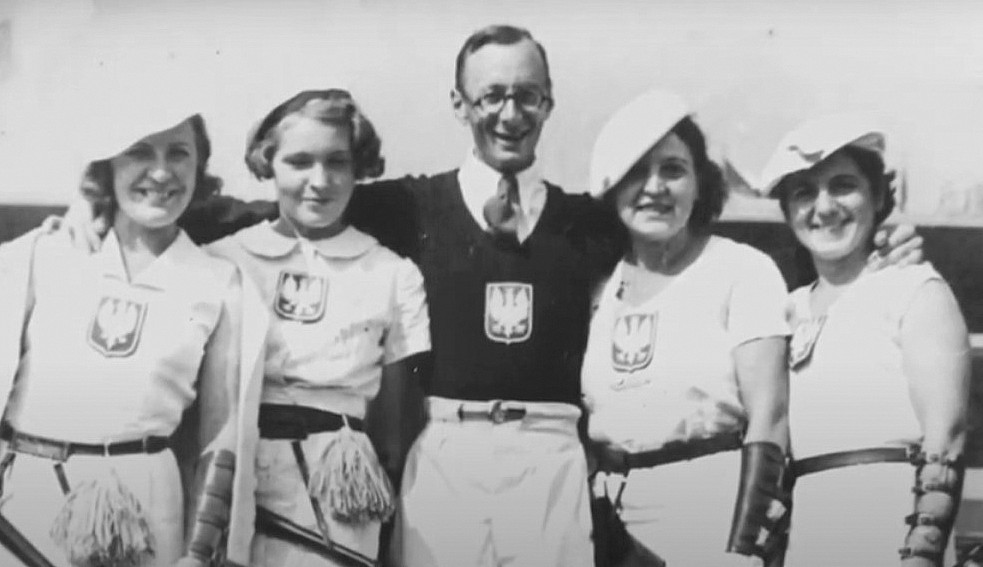
Łotocki with his trainees at the 1936 World Archery Championships

In the years 1930–1936, Łotocki was training the Poland national archery team. At the 1933 World Archery Championships, archers the Polish women's team, trained by Łotocki, won two gold medals. In total, the women trained by him won twenty three medals at the World Archery Championships. He married Maria Pańków, who was one of his trainees. They had a son.

== Military career ==
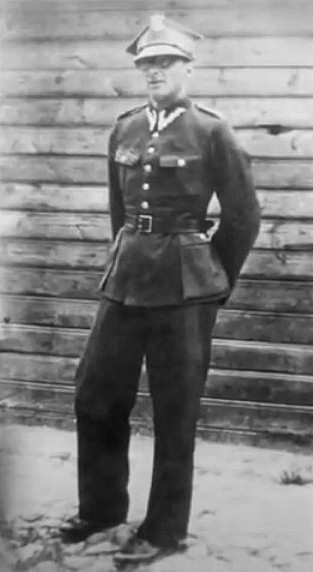
Łotocki in a military uniform

In the 1930s, Łotocki attended the Infantry Reserve Officer Cadet School in Śrem. In 1935, he was promoted to the rank of second lieutenant, and assigned to the 34th Infantry Regiment.

Following the start of the Second World War, he voluntarily joined his regiment, stationed in Bielsk Podlaski. After the Soviet invasion of Poland, he was taken prisoner by Soviet forces. He was taken to the POW Camp for Polish Officers in the Optina Monastery in Kozelsk, Russia.

== Death ==
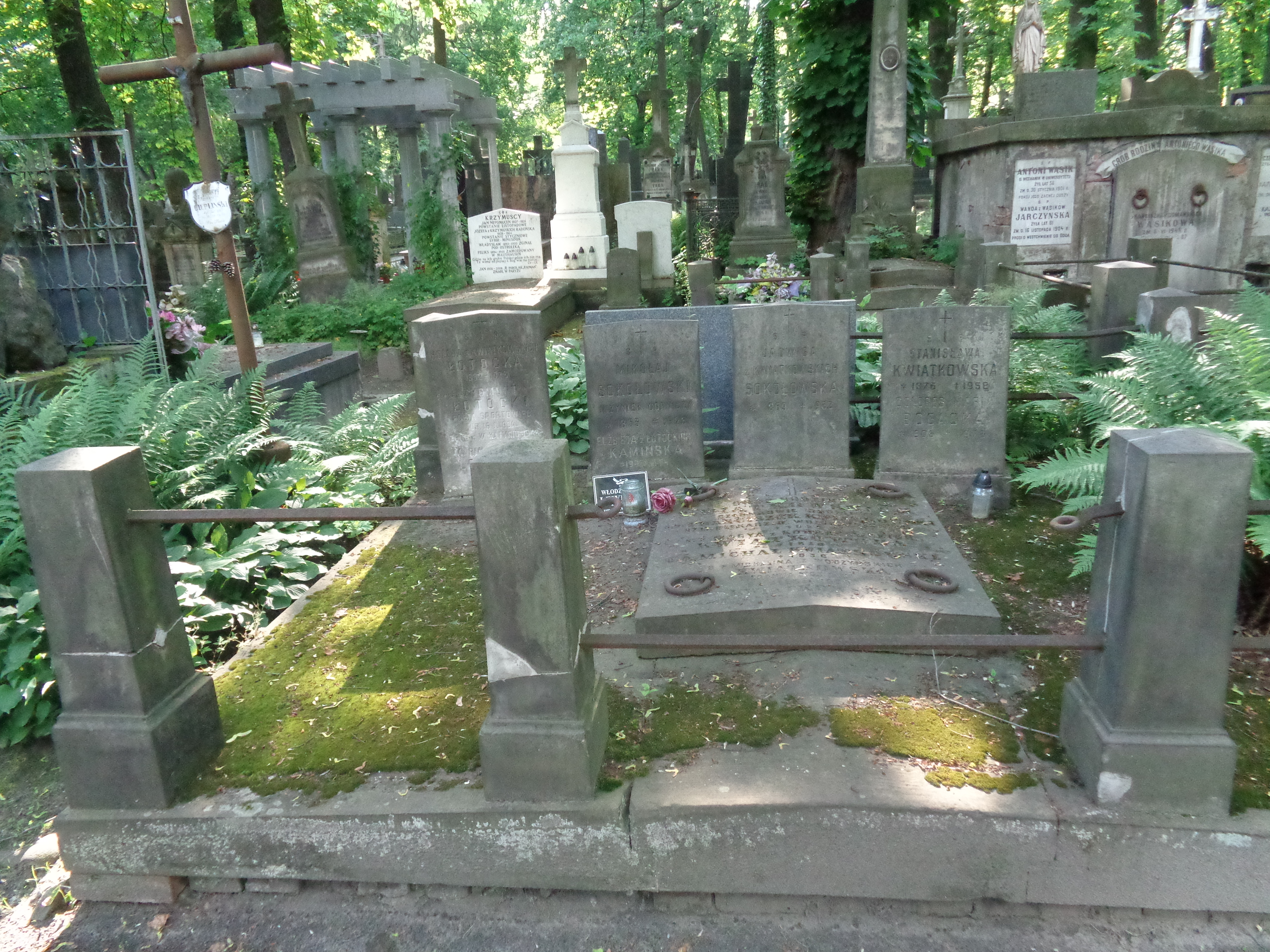
Łotocki's symbolic tomb at the Powązki Cemetery

In March 1940, Soviets started deporting Polish officers from Kozelsk. It is not known when the group that included Łotocki departed. In April or May 1940, he was executed with a shot to the back of the head in the Katyn forest. His body was among the ones exhumed by Germans from the mass graves in Katyn in 1943. His remains were buried at the Katyn Polish War Cemetery. A symbolic tomb was erected at the Powązki Cemetery in Warsaw.

== Bibliography ==
- Zdziarski, Maciej (2023), Sportowcy dla Niepodległej: Katyń, Kraków: Instytut Łukasiewicza, ISBN 978-83-967147-0-1
