= 8th Legions' Infantry Regiment =

- Active: 15 May 1918 – 1939; 1943 – June 1944
- Country: Poland (1918-1939); Home Army (1943-1944)
- Role: Infantry
- Garrison/HQ: Lublin
- Engagements: Polish-Ukrainian War; Polish-Soviet War: Battle of Głębokie; Battle of the Niemen River; May Coup; World War II: Invasion of Poland; Battle of Radom; Battle of Tomaszów Lubelski; Battle of Krasnobród; Operation Tempest

8th Legions Infantry Regiment (Polish: 8 Pulk Piechoty Legionow, 8 pp Leg.) was an infantry regiment of the Polish Army. It existed from 1918 until 1939. Garrisoned in Lublin, and belonged to the 3rd Legions Infantry Division from Zamość. The regiment traced its traditions back to the 8th Infantry Regiment of the Duchy of Warsaw, commanded by Colonel Cyprian Godebski.

The history of the 8th Legions Infantry Regiment dates back to May 1918, when 2nd Infantry Regiment was formed in Ostrów Mazowiecka, by Polska Siła Zbrojna. In early 1919, during the Polish–Ukrainian War, it was renamed as the 8th Legions Infantry Regiment, and kept this name until the dissolution of Poland in October 1939. During the Nazi-Soviet Invasion of Poland, the regiment, together with whole 3rd Legions Infantry Division, which belonged to Prusy Army, fought in several major battles of the war.

== Beginnings ==
The 2nd Infantry Regiment was officially formed by Polska Siła Zbrojna on May 15, 1918. On November 1, its three battalions were sent to Kraków, Lublin and Warsaw, where it guarded the Warsaw Citadel.

In late 1918, the regiment, commanded by Ferdynand Zarzycki, was sent to eastern part of former Austrian Galicia, to fight against the Ukrainians. On January 16, 1919, its name was changed into the 8th Legions Infantry Regiment, and the unit was garrisoned in Lublin.

== Polish–Ukrainian and Polish–Soviet Wars ==
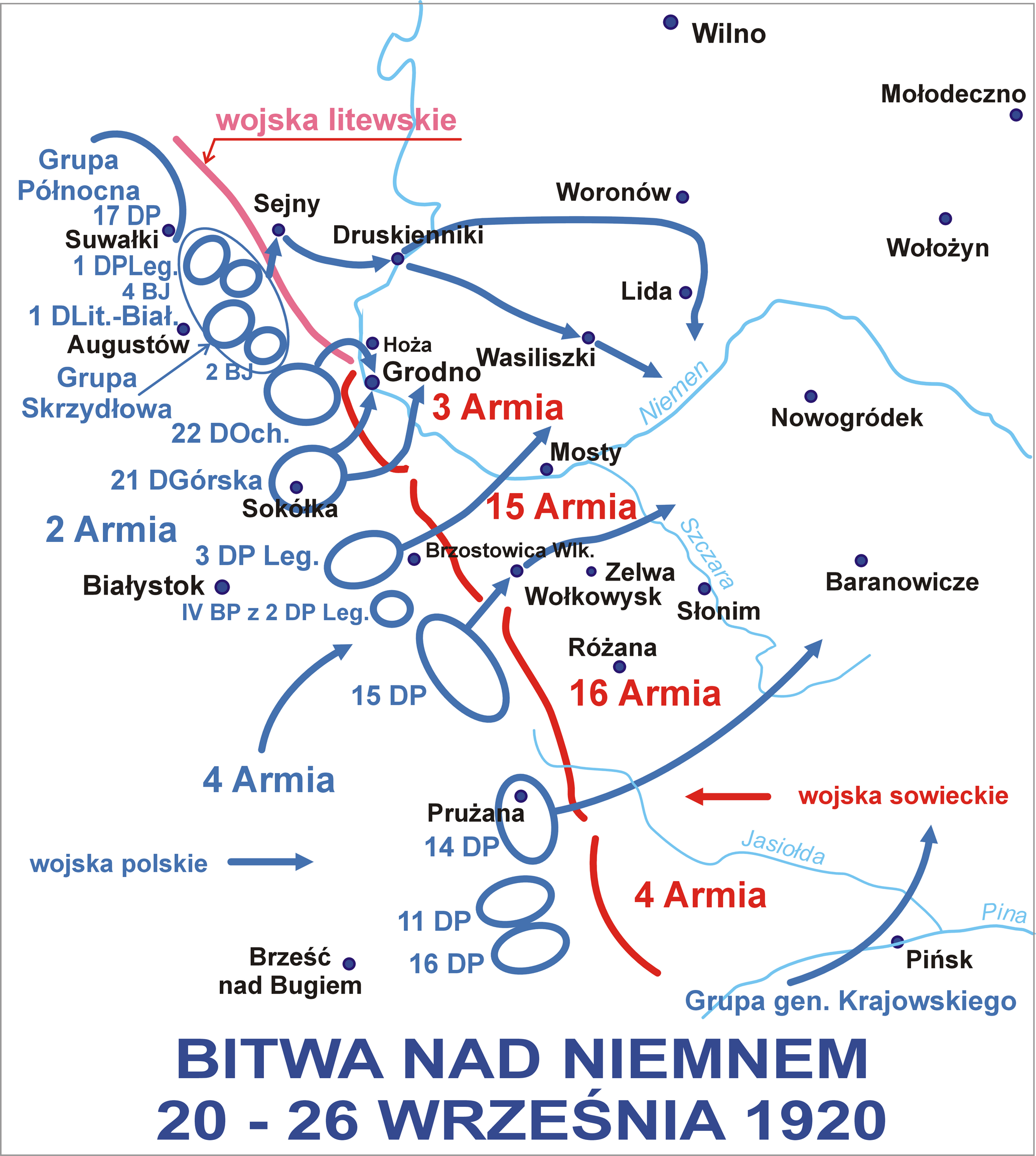
Battle of the Niemen River 1920

The regiment fought in Eastern Galicia and Volhynia from December 1918 until June 1919, suffering heavy losses. Among others, it clashed with the Ukrainians at Rawa Ruska (January 3, 1919), Zolkiew (March 9, 1919), Magierów, Sknilow, Niemirow (March 12, 1919) and Belz.

In early May 1919, the 8th Regiment became part of the 3rd Legions Division, and together with 7th Legions' Infantry Regiment, it formed the V Legions Infantry Brigade. The new brigade clashed with the Ukrainians on May 15 near Stary Sambor. On June 13 it reached Jezupol, to be immediately sent to Czortków, to halt the Ukrainian offensive. On June 13–14, the brigade defeated the enemy near Denysow and Kupczynce, and then defended the town of Brzeżany. On July 10, the brigade crossed the Zbrucz river, and then it was sent northwards, to Wilno, to recuperate. After a few months, it was sent to the line of the Dvina river.

In December 1919, together with the 3rd Legions Infantry Division, the regiment was sent to Latvia, to protect this country from Soviet invasion. The regiment stayed there until mid-March 1920, and in mid-May 1920, it fought in a bloody battle at Dokszyce, losing over 200 soldiers (KIA and WIA).

In June 1920, the 3rd Legions Division was sent to Ukraine, to halt the advance of the 1st Cavalry Army, commanded by Semyon Budyonny. On June 28, the Poles lost Korzec in Volhynia, and were forced to withdraw behind the Horyn. In early August, it fought near Wlodzimierz Wolynski and Hrubieszów, after which the regiment participated in Polish counteroffensive, fighting near Włodawa, where it destroyed Soviet 58th Rifle Division. Finally, the 3rd Legions Division captured the Brest Fortress.

In September 1920, the regiment fought in the Battle of the Niemen River.

In the numerous battles of the wars of 1919–1920, the 8th Legions Infantry Regiment lost 25 officers and 471 soldiers KIA, and 96 officers and 1112 soldiers WIA. In 1928, a mound dedicated to them was erected in Lublin.

== In the Second Polish Republic ==
In May 1926, during the May Coup (Poland), two battalions of the regiment (21 officers, 444 soldiers) were sent by rail to Warsaw, reaching the capital of Poland on May 14, at 8 a.m. During the street fighting, one officer (Colonel Jozef Niedzielski) was killed. The regiment, together with the 3rd Legions Division, supported Józef Piłsudski.

The 8th Legions Infantry Regiment supported different activities in Lublin and its area, such as concerts, holidays and sports, as it was one of sponsors of Military Sports Club KS Lublinianka. A residential district with houses for the officers was built in the village of Czechowo Gorne (now a neighborhood of Lublin). The regiment was frequently visited by both Józef Piłsudski and Edward Rydz-Śmigły.

== 1939 September Campaign ==
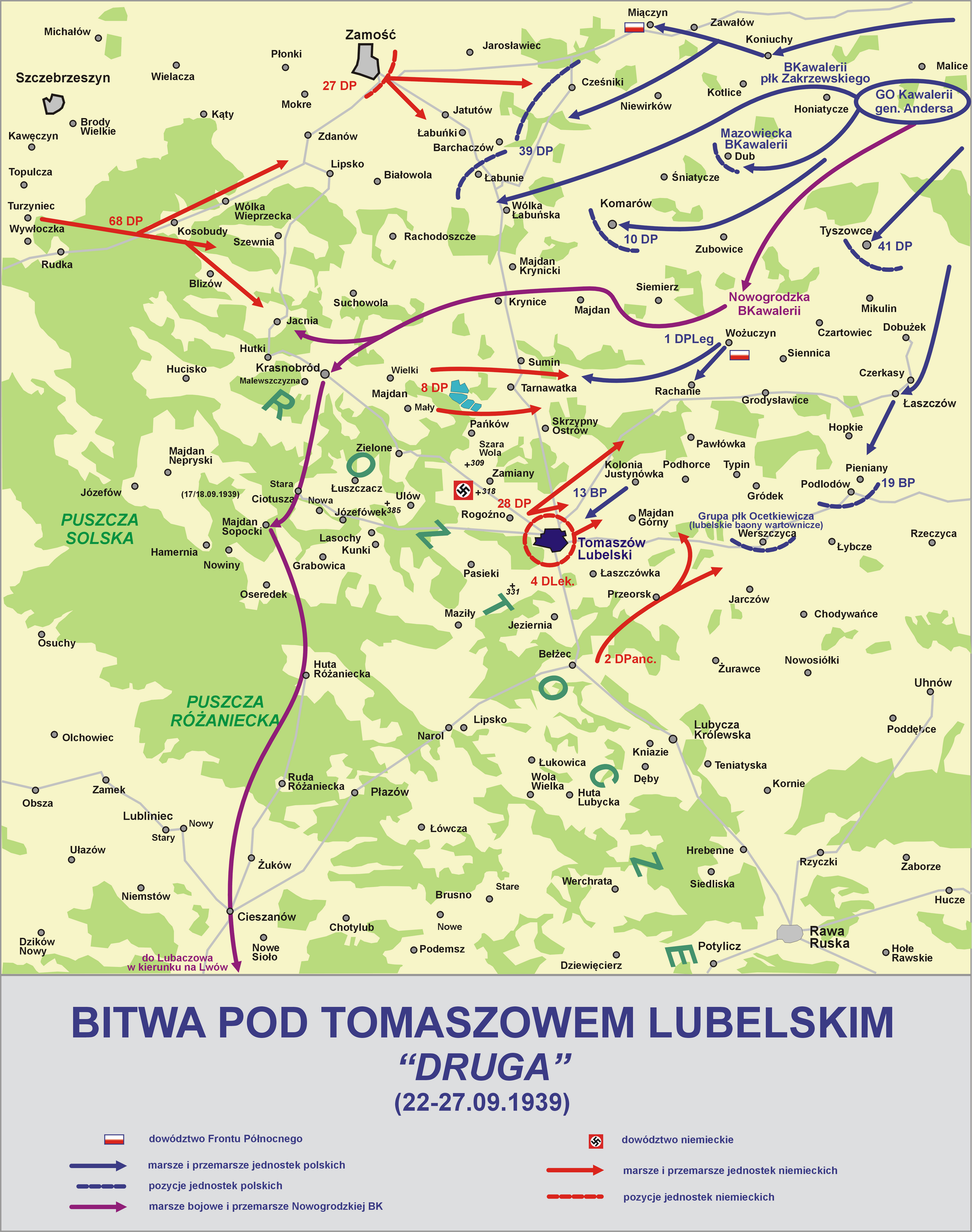
Map of the second phase by Lonio77

According to the Polish Army mobilization plan W, the 8th Regiment was to be mobilized in the first phase, to be ready for combat on the fourth day.

On August 30, 1939, the mobilization of the unit was announced, and August 31 was established as the first day. Together with the 3rd Legions Infantry Division, the regiment with its 91 officers and 3212 NCOs and soldiers, belonged to Prusy Army. The mobilization itself took place in difficult conditions, under bombardment of the Luftwaffe planes.

In the night of September 2/3, the 1st Battalion was sent by rail from Lublin to the frontline. The 2nd Battalion left on September 4. The 3rd Battalion did not reach Dęblin, as rail lines had been destroyed, and on September 6, it was transferred to the 9th Legions Infantry Regiment. Tasked with defence of the line between Dęblin and Kazimierz Dolny, on September 10 it clashed with the enemy near Puławy.

After reaching the Prusy Army, 1st and 2nd Battalions fought in several battles, such as the Battle of Iłża, Battle of Samsonow, and Battle of Puławy. After these battles, both battalions began to retreat southwards, to the planned Romanian Bridgehead. Near Rejowiec, they finally joined forces with the 3rd Battalion, and were reinforced with reserve units from Chełm. On September 22–23, the regiment clashed with the enemy in the Battle of Tomaszów Lubelski, and again in the Battle of Krasnobród.

The 8th Legions Infantry Regiment capitulated to the Germans on September 25, in the village of Szopowe. Before that happened, a number of officers and soldiers of the regiment had surrendered to the Soviets, who had convinced them to fight against the Wehrmacht. These officers were concentrated in Zamość, and sent to the camps, to be later murdered in the Katyn massacre.

== Commandants ==
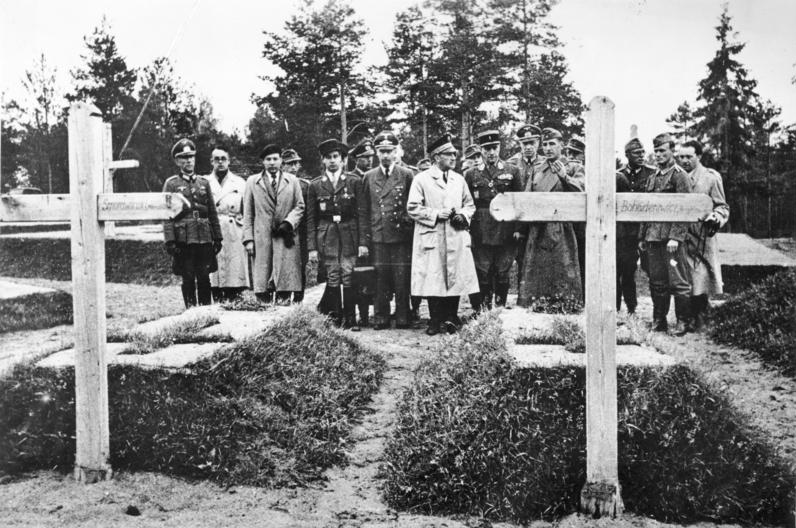
Secretary of State of the Vichy regime Fernand de Brinon 1943 in Katyn at the graves of Mieczysław Smorawiński and Bronisław Bohaterewicz

All commandants of the regiment were first class officers of the Polish Army, many of whom had been members of the First Cadre Company. Many were close associates of Józef Piłsudski, and all were awarded the Virtuti Militari. First commandant, Ferdynand Zarzycki was in 1933 – 34 Minister of Trade under Prime Minister Aleksander Prystor.

- Colonel Ferdynand Zarzycki (1918–1919),
- Captain Franciszek Kruk Grzybowski (1919),
- Major Mieczysław Smorawiński (1919, murdered in Katyn),
- Major Czeslaw Jarnuszkiewicz (1919–1920),
- Colonel Franciszek Daniel Paulik (1919, murdered by the NKVD),
- Colonel Władysław Bończa-Uzdowski (1919–1920),
- Captain Zygmunt Szafranowski (1920),
- Captain Leon Winiarski (1920–1921),
- Colonel Bruno Olbrycht (1923–1927),
- Colonel Leopold Endel-Ragis (1927–1930),
- Colonel Jan Zaluska (1930–1938, murdered in Katyn),
- Colonel Wincenty Wnuk (July 1938 – March 1939),
- Colonel Antoni Cebulski (March 1939 – September 1939).

== Symbols and traditions ==
Left side of the flag

Right side of the flag

On May 15, 1920, in Budslaw (in what is now Lithuania), Colonel Leon Berbecki, commandant of the 3rd Legions Infantry Division, handed the regimental flag to its commandant, Wladyslaw Boncza-Uzdowski. The flag was funded by the residents of Lublin. During the 1939 war, the flag was with the soldiers until September 9. After the Battle of Iłża, a group of officers under Ludwik Ossowski was ordered to hide it in a safe place. They reached the area of Frampol, burying the flag in a local forests. Despite several efforts, it has not been found.

The regiment had two badges. First, a design by Czeslaw Jarnuszkiewicz was approved in 1921. It featured the dates 1807, when the 8th Infantry Regiment of the Duchy of Warsaw was formed, and 1918, when the Legions Regiment was formed in Ostrów Mazowiecka. The second badge was designed in 1928. It was in the shape of the Cross of Saint Rupert of Salzburg, with number 8 in the middle, and the initial PP Leg, plus the dates: 1807, 1918.

The regiment celebrates its holiday on May 15.

In 1943–44, the 8th Legions Infantry Regiment was re-created by the Home Army, for Operation Tempest. In June 1944, it was incorporated into the 27th Home Army Infantry Division.

== Sources ==
- Kazimierz Satora: Opowieści wrześniowych sztandarów. Warszawa: Instytut Wydawniczy Pax, 1990
- Zdzisław Jagiełło: Piechota Wojska Polskiego 1918–1939. Warszawa: Bellona, 2007
- "8 Pułk Piechoty Legionów". Wojskowe Centrum Edukacji Obywatelskiej (in Polish).

== See also ==
- 1939 Infantry Regiment (Poland)
