= Edmund Kessler =

Polish military officer (1880–1930)

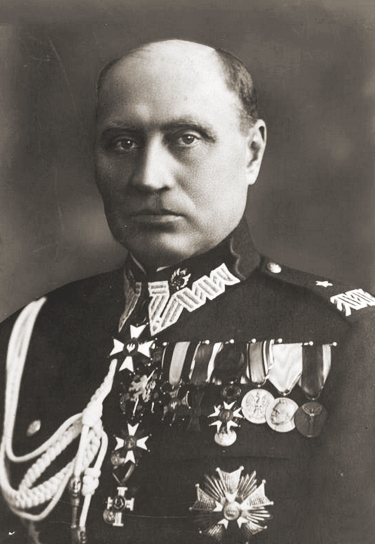
- Born: 9 February 1880; Suwałki, Congress Poland
- Died: 7 May 1930 (aged 50)
- Burial place: Cemetery of the Defenders of Lwów
- Education: Nikolaev Military Academy
- Military career
- Service years: 1899–1928
- Rank: Generał broni
- Units: Chief of the General Staff of the Polish Army
- Conflicts: Russo-Japanese War; World War I

Edmund Kessler (February 9, 1880 – May 7, 1930, in Warsaw) was a Brigadier General of the Polish Army, Knight of the Order of Virtuti Militari.

== Biography ==
Kessler was born on 9 February 1880, in Suwałki (then part of Congress Poland), the son of Jan Kessler and Elżbieta (née Szmidt) Kessler. After graduating from a teachers' college in Veiveriai (nowadays in Lithuania), he began his military service in the Imperial Russian Army in 1899. In January 1905, at his own request, he was commissioned to serve in the Russo-Japanese War; from August 1914, he participated in World War I as commander of a border guard squadron. He subsequently served on the staffs of the 2nd and 3rd Russian Armies. In 1917, he graduated from the Nikolaev Military Academy in Saint Petersburg.

On 10 December 1917, Kessler joined the 1st Polish Corps in Russia and was appointed senior adjutant and then chief of staff of the 3rd Rifle Division commanded by General Wacław Iwaszkiewicz-Rudoszański. He participated in the division's advance from Yelnya to Babruysk,. He participated in the battles of Boltutin, Horodets, and Pobolovo.

On 9 December 1918, Kessler was accepted into the Polish Army and appointed chief of staff of the 1st Lithuanian–Belarusian Division. On March 19, 1919, he was appointed chief of staff of the Eastern Lesser Poland Troops, and on June 1 of that year, chief of staff of the Galician-Volhynian Front. Where he played a significant role during the defense of Lviv (from 23 July – the Galician Front, and from 2 January 1920 – the Podolian Front). From April to August 1920, he commanded the staff of the 6th Army, formed from units of the Podolian Front. On October 14, he was appointed Chief of Staff of the General District "Warsaw" with the rank of colonel. In January 1921, he also became a member of the Extraordinary Military Court. In 1921, he was promoted to brigadier general with seniority effective 1 June 1919.

On 1 September 1921, Kessler was appointed commander of the 20th Infantry Division. On 2 June 1924, he became First Deputy Chief of the General Staff of the Polish Army, Stanisław Haller. From 16 December 1925 to May 1926, he temporarily served as Chief of the General Staff of the Polish Army. On 20 September 1926, he was appointed Commandant of the Higher War School in Warsaw.

On 30 September 1928, Kessler retired. He settled in Warsaw. He died on 7 May 1930, at Ujazdów Hospital in Warsaw, following pleurisy. He was buried at the Evangelical-Augsburg Cemetery, and a few months later at the Cemetery of the Defenders of Lwów (plot II, location 57).

Kessler was married twice. His first wife was a née Korsak, and his second wife was Zenaida Strachow.

== Awards ==
- Silver Cross of the Military Order of Virtuti Militari No. 5220 (28 February 1922)
- Commander's Cross of the Order of Polonia Restituta (27 December 1924)
- Cross of Independence
- Officer's Cross of the Order of Polonia Restituta
- Cross of Valour
- Gold Cross of Merit
- Commemorative Medal for the 1918–1921 War
- Medal of the Tenth Anniversary of Regained Independence
- Amaranth Ribbon of the 1st Polish Corps in the East
- Grand Officer of the Order of the Three Stars (Latvia, 1927)
- Grand Officer of the Order of the Crown (Belgium)
- Commander's Cross of the Order of the White Lion (Czechoslovakia)
- Officer's Cross of the Legion of Honour (France, until 1921)[12]
- Cross of Liberty, 1st Category, 2nd Class (Estonia, 1925)
- Victory Medal (Médaille Interalliée) – 1925
