= Battle of Jazłowiec =

1919 battle between Ukrainian and Polish forces

- Part of Polish–Ukrainian War
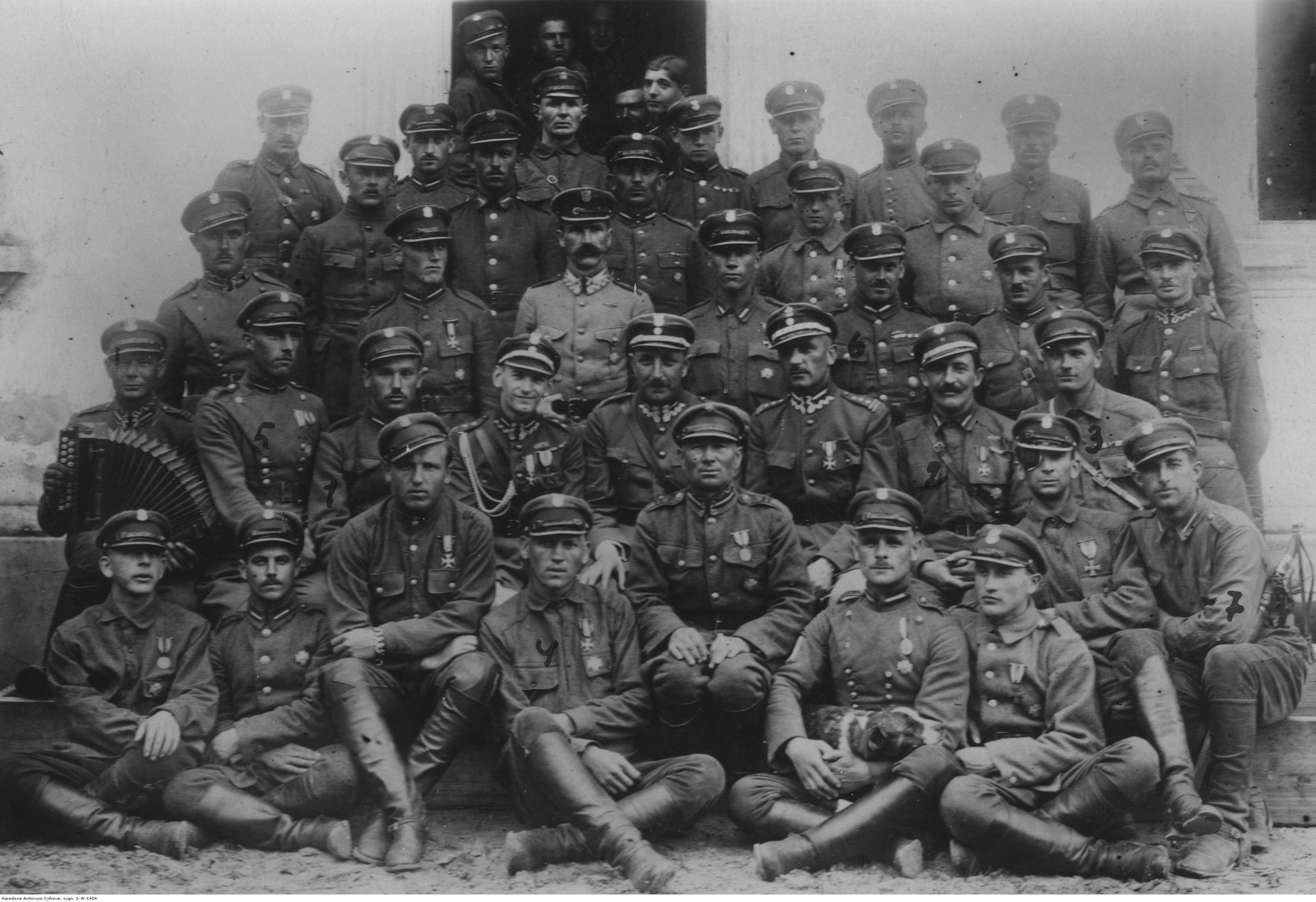
- Officers and non-commissioned officers of the 14th Jazłowiec Uhlan Regiment in 1921
Date	11–13 July 1919
Location	Jazłowiec, Eastern Galicia
Result	Polish victory
Territorial changes	Poland seizes Jazłowiec

Belligerents
West Ukrainian People's Republic	Poland

Commanders and leaders
Oleksander Hrekov	Konstanty Plisowski

Casualties and losses
Heavy losses; 1,500 captured	Unknown

The Battle of Jazłowiec (Ukrainian: Битва під Язловцем) was a battle fought between the Ukrainian Galician Army commanded by General Oleksander Hrekov and Polish forces led by Konstanty Plisowski during the Polish-Ukrainian War, which took place from 11 to 13 July 1919. The battle ended with the victory of the Polish side and the capture of Jazłowiec.

== Prelude ==
Most of the Polish units remained in their positions. Only in a few areas did General Iwaszkiewicz permit greater adjustments to the front line (primarily on the southern flank). The aim of these actions was to seize more advantageous positions in preparation for the resumption of the offensive planned for mid-July. The largest operation was carried out by the 4th Rifle Division.

After the soldiers of General Lucjan Żeligowski's 4th Rifle Division captured bridgeheads on the Dniester, the front command ordered its spearhead to move eastward. It was to occupy positions between the Dniester and General Franciszek Aleksandrowicz's 4th Infantry Division. Carrying out this order, most of General Żeligowski's soldiers crossed to the left bank of the river on 6 July and, after concentrating in the area of Sokołów and Barysz, began a march toward the Strypa. On 8 July, the division commander received another order from General Iwaszkiewicz. The front commander instructed him to force a crossing of the Strypa and establish a broad bridgehead in the area of Jazłowiec.

== Battle ==
Between 11 and 13 July 1919, during the second Polish offensive in Eastern Galicia, a battle took place near Jazłowiec. The southern flank of the Polish forces advancing eastward encountered a concentrated Ukrainian brigade. On the first day, after crossing the Strypa River without resistance, Polish infantry captured the town, while the 14th Cavalry Regiment, commanded by Major Konstanty Plisowski, attacked the retreating Ukrainians, cutting off their escape route and crushing their main forces. On the second day, the Ukrainians launched a counterattack from positions east of Jazłowiec, which collapsed in the face of a daring charge by reserve squadrons of Polish cavalry. During these two days of fighting, about 1,000 Ukrainian soldiers were captured by Polish forces. The next day was only a pursuit of the defeated Ukrainians.

== Aftermath ==
In total, in the three-day battle, as many as 1,500 Ukrainian soldiers and a large amount of weapons were added to the Polish captivity. Three days after the Battle of Jazłowiec, the Poles pushed the enemy beyond the Zbruch River, as well as from part of Volhynia. The charge at Jazłowiec was considered one of the most brilliant victories in the history of Polish cavalry. In its memory, the 14th Uhlan Regiment was given the name of the Jazłowiec Uhlan, and 11 July became a regimental holiday.

== Bibliography ==
- Rąkowski, Grzegorz (2005). Przewodnik krajoznawczo-historyczny po Ukrainie Zachodniej. Pruszków: Rewasz. ISBN 978-83-89188-46-5.
- Tym, Juliusz S. (2021). Jazłowiec 11-13 VII 1919. Bitwy Kawalerii. Warszawa: My Hobby Media 4U Sp. z o.o. ISBN 978-83-66705-30-2.
