= Sokół, Masovian Voivodeship =

Sokół
- Village
- Location within Poland
- Coordinates: 51°45′29″N 21°42′21″E
- Country: Poland
- Voivodeship: Masovian
- County: Garwolin
- Gmina: Sobolew

Sokół [ˈsɔkuu̯] is a village in the administrative district of Gmina Sobolew, within Garwolin County, Masovian Voivodeship, in east-central Poland.
