= Kozielsk =

- Village
- Location within Poland
- Coordinates: 53°5′N 20°4′E
- Country: Poland
- Voivodeship: Masovian
- County: Żuromin
- Gmina: Kuczbork-Osada
- Time zone: UTC+1 (CET)
  - Summer (DST): UTC+2 (CEST)
- Vehicle registration: WZU

"Kozielsk" is also the Polish name for the Russian town of Kozelsk.

Kozielsk [ˈkɔʑɛlsk] is a village in the administrative district of Gmina Kuczbork-Osada, within Żuromin County, Masovian Voivodeship, in north-central Poland.
