= Konstanty Plisowski =

Polish general (1890–1940)

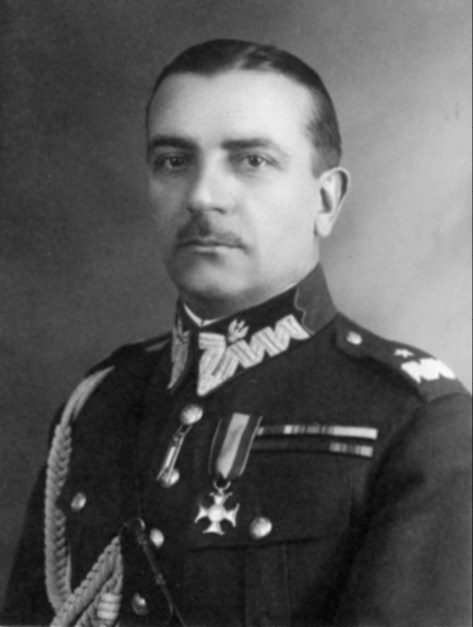
- Born: 8 June 1890; Nowosiółki
- Died: spring 1940; Kharkov, then Soviet Union
- Military career
- Allegiance: Poland
- Rank: General

Konstanty Plisowski of the Odrowąż coat of arms (8 June 1890 – 1940) was a Polish general and military commander. He was the Commander in the battle of Jazłowiec and the battle of Brześć Litewski. He was murdered in Katyn.

== Biography ==
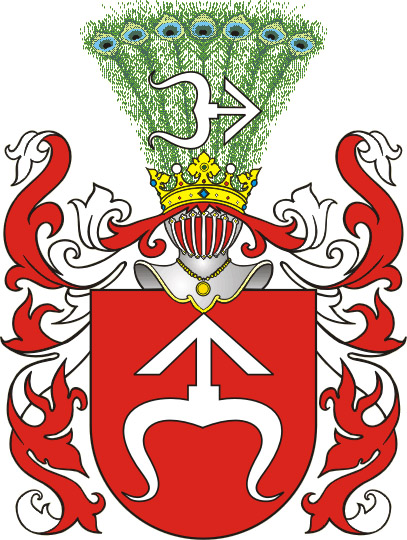
Odrowaz Coat of Arms

Konstanty Plisowski was born on 8 June 1890 in his family village of Nowosiółki in Podolia, to a family of szlachta ancestry of Odrowąż coat of arms. In 1908 he joined the Russian army, and served with distinction until 1917. During World War I, Plisowski was transferred to the 1st Polish Corps. Since 1917 served as a commander of the cavalry regiment attached to the Polish 4th Rifle Division under general Lucjan Żeligowski. After Poland regained her independence in 1918, he joined the Polish Army. The following year, during the Polish-Ukrainian War he was assigned to the 14th Uhlans Regiment as its commanding officer. He became famous as a cavalry commander after the Jazłowiec cavalry charge (11 July 1919) that became part of the popular culture as one of the synonyms of bravery.

During the Polish-Bolshevik War of 1920 Plisowski served as a commander of the 6th cavalry brigade and later of the 8th cavalry brigade. He was also briefly the commanding officer of Rómmel's 1st Cavalry Division. He took part in the famous Battle of Komarów. After the war he remained in the army and served at various command posts. At the same time he was also a professor of tactics at the Higher War School in Warsaw. On 4 January 1929 he was promoted to generał brygady, but in 1930 was demobilised and retired due to his poor health.

During the Polish Defensive War of 1939 Plisowski found himself in Brześć, where he volunteered for the army. He was made the commander of the Brześć Fortress and managed to organise resistance against the advancing German XIX Panzer Corps of general Heinz Guderian. After the unconcluded Battle of Brześć, in which his four infantry battalions managed to halt the advance of four German divisions for four days, Plisowski retreated with his men and joined the forces of general Franciszek Kleeberg. He was assigned to the Cavalry Operational Group of general Władysław Anders as his deputy. On 24 September he was made the commanding officer of the Nowogródzka Cavalry Brigade, with which he fought both against Nazi Germany and the Soviet Union.

=== Death in Kharkov ===
On 28 September 1939 Plisowski was taken prisoner of war by the Soviets and sent to the Special NKVD Interrogation Camp for Polish PoWs in Starobielsk. Following the orders of Joseph Stalin, he was murdered at the District Directorate of the NKVD in Kharkov in the spring of 1940, aged forty-nine, in what became known as the Katyn Massacres, and buried in a nameless mass grave in Piatichatki, where the Cemetery of Victims of Totalitarianism in Kharkov was officially opened on June 17, 2000.

Since 20 March 1996, the Polish 6th Armoured Cavalry Brigade bears the name of General Plisowski.

==== Other Polish generals murdered in Kharkov ====
The victims of the Katyn Massacres include 20 or so Polish generals, among whom Leon Billewicz, Stanisław Haller, Aleksander Kowalewski, Kazimierz Łukoski, Franciszek Sikorski, Leonard Skierski, Piotr Skuratowicz were murdered at the same location as Pilowski.

== Promotions ==
- Major –
- Colonel – 23 August 1919
- Brigadier General – 4 January 1929
- Major General – 9 November 2007 (posthumously)

=== Honours and awards ===
- Silver Cross of the Virtuti Militari (1921)
- Chevalier of the Legion of Honour (France, 1921)
- Order of Saint George, 4th class
- Order of the White Eagle
