= Katyn (rural locality) =

Katyn Катынь
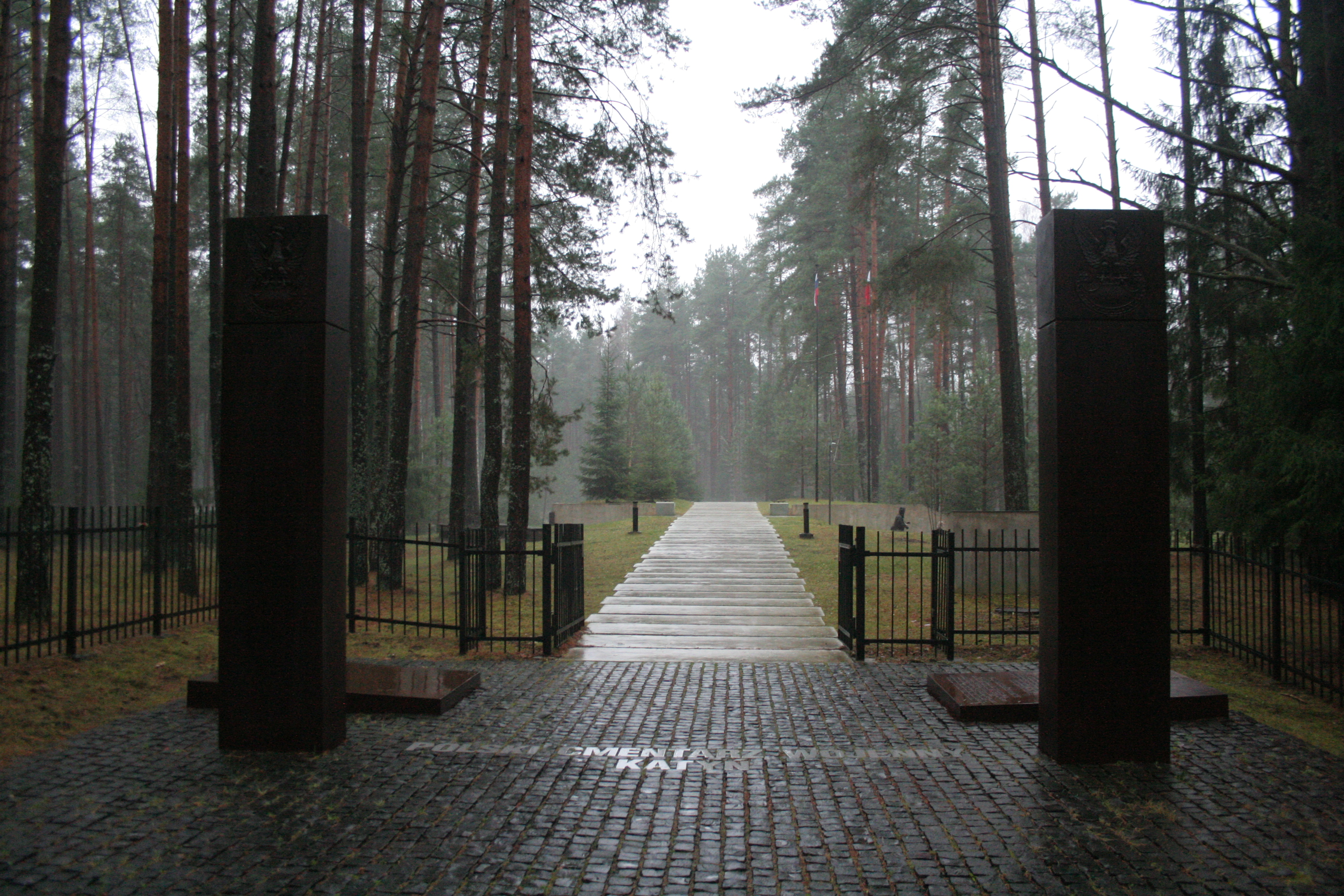
- Katyn Polish War Cemetery
- Interactive map of Katyn
- Location of Katyn Katyn (European Russia) Katyn (Smolensk Oblast)
- Coordinates: 54°46′12.32″N 31°41′23.32″E
- Country: Russia
- Federal subject: Smolensk Oblast
- Elevation: 167 m (548 ft)

Population
  - Estimate (2002): 1,737 )
- Time zone: UTC+3 (MSK)
- Postal code: 214522
- Dialing code: +7 481
- OKTMO ID: 66644436101

Katyn (Russian: Кáтынь [ˈkatɨnʲ]; Polish: Katyń [ˈkatɨɲ]) is a rural locality (a selo) in Smolensky District of Smolensk Oblast, Russia, located approximately 20 kilometers (12 mi) to the west of Smolensk, the administrative center of the oblast. The village had a population of 1,737 in 2007.

== Geography ==
It is situated to the west of the city of Smolensk (about 18 km from its center) and circa 60 km from the Russian borders with Belarus. It has a station on the Berlin-Warsaw-Minsk-Moscow international railway line.

== History ==
Before World War I, Gnyozdovo with the Katyn Forest belonged to the Koźliński family. In the 19th century, Piotr Koźliński married Leokadia Lefftreu, the daughter of the director of the English railway construction company in Russia. Under the marriage articles Gniezdovo and Katyn became co-owned by the British.

=== Katyn massacre ===
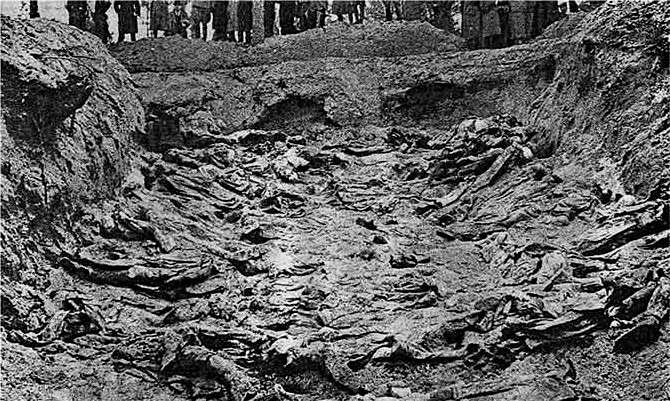
Mass grave of the victims of the Katyn massacre after discovery in 1943

The Katyn Forest, in the vicinity of the village, was the site of the Katyn massacre during World War II, in which thousands of captured Polish officers and other citizens were killed. On 5 March 1940, Stalin approved, together with Voroshilov, Mikoyan and Molotov, a proposal from Beria that led to the assassination of 21,857 Poles.

Despite claims by the Poles, the Soviet Union blamed Nazi Germany for the mass murders and attempted to hide its involvement, going as far as to ban all mention of the Katyn massacre in the USSR. In 1990, Soviet leader Mikhail Gorbachev admitted that the NKVD had executed the Poles and confirmed two other burial sites similar to the site at Katyn: Mednoye and Piatykhatky. A number of earlier mass graves of victims of the Soviet system have also been found there, because Katyn Forest had long been used as an execution site for Soviet citizens.

The NKVD resolved to execute prisoners of war and "members of various counter-revolutionary organisations, former landowners, factory owners, former Polish officers, officials and escapees". In 2004, Polish prosecutors described this as a plan to eliminate in part the "intellectual elite of the Polish Nation", so as "to prevent the rebirth of Polish statehood".

The 2007 Polish film Katyń, directed by Andrzej Wajda, is an interpretation of the events that led up to the mass execution.

== Climate ==
Katyn has a warm-summer humid continental climate (Dfb in the Köppen climate classification).

Climate data for Katyn
Month	Jan	Feb	Mar	Apr	May	Jun	Jul	Aug	Sep	Oct	Nov	Dec	Year
Mean daily maximum °C (°F)	−4.2 (24.4)	−3.4 (25.9)	2.2 (36.0)	11.1 (52.0)	17.3 (63.1)	20.5 (68.9)	23.0 (73.4)	21.6 (70.9)	16.0 (60.8)	8.7 (47.7)	2.6 (36.7)	−1.5 (29.3)	9.5 (49.1)
Daily mean °C (°F)	−6.3 (20.7)	−5.8 (21.6)	−1.2 (29.8)	6.6 (43.9)	13.1 (55.6)	16.7 (62.1)	19.2 (66.6)	17.8 (64.0)	12.4 (54.3)	6.1 (43.0)	0.8 (33.4)	−3.2 (26.2)	6.3 (43.4)
Mean daily minimum °C (°F)	−8.7 (16.3)	−8.8 (16.2)	−4.9 (23.2)	1.5 (34.7)	7.8 (46.0)	11.8 (53.2)	14.6 (58.3)	13.5 (56.3)	8.7 (47.7)	3.4 (38.1)	−1.1 (30.0)	−5.2 (22.6)	2.7 (36.9)
Average precipitation mm (inches)	53 (2.1)	47 (1.9)	45 (1.8)	46 (1.8)	75 (3.0)	84 (3.3)	97 (3.8)	80 (3.1)	65 (2.6)	68 (2.7)	57 (2.2)	50 (2.0)	767 (30.3)
Source: https://en.climate-data.org/asia/russian-federation/smolensk-oblast/katyn-447685/

== See also ==
- War crimes in occupied Poland during World War II
- Bronisław Bohaterewicz
