= Franciszek Sikorski =

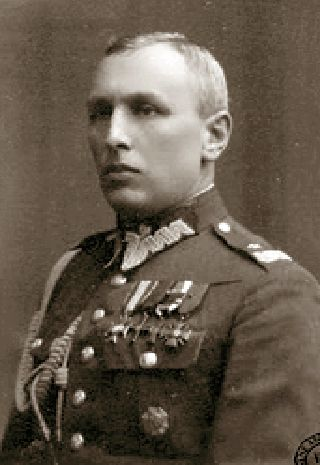
Franciszek Sikorski

Franciszek Józef Sikorski (4 October 1889 Lwów – spring 1940 Kharkov) was a Polish engineer, Brigadier general of the Polish Army and a murdered victim of the Katyn Massacre.

== Life ==
Sikorski was born in Lemberg, Austrian Galicia, and graduated from the local technical college. Before World War I, he was an active member of several Polish paramilitary organizations, including Union of Active Struggle and Riflemen's Association. In 1912, he completed a military course for officers, and joined Polish Legions in World War I, as battalion commandant in the 3rd and later 4th Infantry Regiment. In January 1915, Sikorski was promoted to captain. After the Oath crisis of 1917, he was arrested, and forced to join the Austro-Hungarian Army. In January 1918, he became the commandant of Lwów District of Polish Military Organisation.

In November 1918, Sikorski joined the newly created Polish Army, serving as commandant of the 13th Rifle Regiment of the 4th Division of Polish Rifles (General Lucjan Żeligowski). As commandant of the 20th Infantry Brigade, he fought in the Polish–Soviet War, including the Battle of Warsaw (1920) and in Eastern Galicia.

In December 1920, Sikorski entered Wyższa Szkoła Wojenna, studying there until April 1921. After completion of his course, he was named commandant of the 10th Infantry Division. Transferred in early 1923 to the 6th Infantry Division, he remained there until July 1926. During the 1926 May Coup (Poland), he supported Józef Piłsudski.

From July 1926 until March 1932, Sikorski commanded the 9th Infantry Division. On 16 March 1927 he was promoted to the rank of General brygady. On 30 June 1933 Sikorski retired from active service, settling in Warsaw. On 5 September 1939 he was evacuated to Brzesc, and then to Lwów, where he took over the command of the city on 12 September, fighting in the Battle of Lwów (1939). After capitulation he was imprisoned by the Soviets in the camp for Polish prisoners of war (POWs) at Starobilsk.

Together with nearly 3800 Polish POWs held at the prison in Starobilsk, General Franciszek Sikorski was murdered by the NKVD in the spring of 1940 in Kharkiv, aged 50. On 5 October 2007 President Lech Kaczyński posthumously promoted him to Divisional general.

== Family ==
Sikorski was married and had three daughters: Krystyna (b. 1924), Adela called Ada (1928–1996) and Maria (b. 1931). Ada, Maria and their mother were among the hundreds of thousands of Poles deported by the Soviet Union to forced labor camps in Siberia. The three were taken in 1940 to a forced labor settlement in Zapadnyi in the Arkhangelsk Oblast. They managed to leave the Soviet Union with the newly created Polish Anders' Army for Iran in 1942. Adela and Maria were among the many thousands of Polish children learning in 1942–45 in Polish schools that were established in Isfahan.

As an adult, Ada Fighiera Sikorska was a leading Esperantist and editor of the “Heraldo de Esperanto".

== Awards ==
- Silver Cross of the Virtuti Militari
- Cross of Independence
- Gold Cross of Merit
- Cross of Valour (Poland)
- Cross of the 1939 Campaign (posthumously, awarded in London on 15 August 1985).

== Sources ==
- Piotr Stawecki, Słownik biograficzny generałów Wojska Polskiego 1918–1939, Wydawnictwo Bellona, Warszawa 1994
- Tadeusz Kryska-Karski, Stanisław Żurakowski, Generałowie Polski Niepodległej, Editions Spotkania, Warszawa 1991

== See also ==
- List of Polish generals
- Polish prisoners-of-war in the Soviet Union after 1939
