= Alojzy Wir-Konas =

Polish infantry officer (1894–1940)

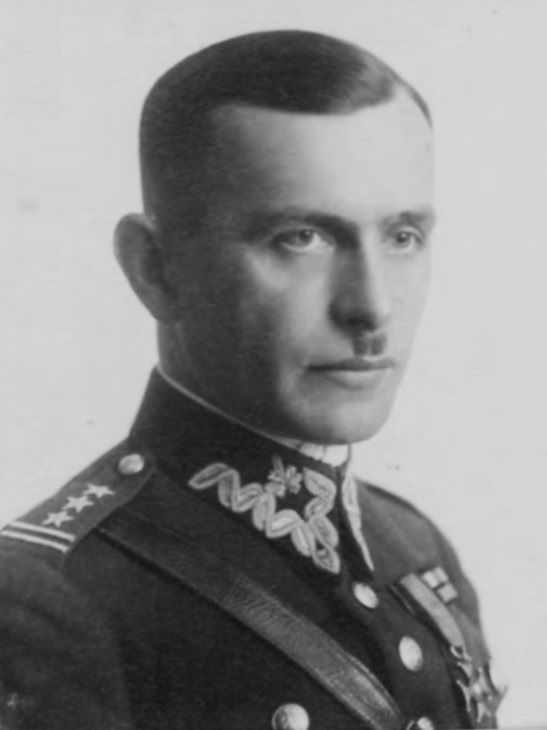
- Born: 13 May 1894; Maków, Austria-Hungary
- Died: spring 1940; Kharkiv, Ukrainian SSR, Soviet Union
- Burial place: Piatykhatky
- Other name: Antoni Konas
- Military career
- Allegiance: Austria-Hungary; Poland
- Branch: Austro-Hungarian Army; Polish Legions; Polish Army
- Service years: 1914–1940
- Rank: Colonel of infantry
- Nickname: Wir
- Commands: company and battalion, Polish Legions; 25th Infantry Regiment; 84th Polesie Rifle Regiment; divisional infantry, 21st Mountain Infantry Division; 38th Infantry Division
- Conflicts: World War I; Polish–Soviet War; World War II; September Campaign
- Awards: Silver Cross of the Virtuti Militari; Cross of Independence; Cross of Valour (four times); Gold Cross of Merit; Commemorative Medal for the War of 1918–1921; Medal of the Tenth Anniversary of Regained Independence

Alojzy Wir-Konas, also known as Antoni Konas and by the pseudonym Wir (13 May 1894 – spring 1940), was a Polish infantry colonel of the Polish Army, a recipient of the Virtuti Militari, and a victim of the Katyn massacre. During the September Campaign of 1939, he commanded the reserve 38th Infantry Division. Wounded on 17 September 1939 while attempting to reach besieged Lwów, he was later taken into Soviet captivity, imprisoned at Starobielsk, and murdered by the NKVD in Kharkiv in spring 1940. In 2007 he was posthumously promoted to brigadier general.

== Biography ==
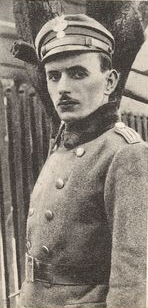
Captain Alojzy Wir-Konas during his service in the Polish Legions.

Wir-Konas was born on 13 May 1894 in Maków, then part of Austria-Hungary. He was the son of Antoni and Wiktoria, née Płaszczak. His brother was Edward Konas, pseudonym Mur (1895–1916), a legionary who was posthumously decorated with the Virtuti Militari and the Cross of Independence.

On 29 June 1912, he completed his education at the Imperial-Royal Real Gymnasium No. IV in Kraków. He then began studies at the Faculty of Philosophy of the Jagiellonian University. He was a member of the Riflemen's Association.

During World War I, Wir-Konas served in the Polish Legions as a company commander and battalion commander with the rank of lieutenant. In 1915 he was promoted to captain. After the Oath crisis, on 23 November 1917 he was incorporated into the Austro-Hungarian Army, assigned to the assault battalion of the 12th Infantry Division, and sent to the Italian Front near Cordolezzo.

In November 1918 he joined the Polish Army. From 1919 he served as a battalion commander in the 25th Infantry Regiment and then in the 26th Infantry Regiment. During this period he was promoted to major. He later returned to the 25th Infantry Regiment and, as commander of a battalion and of the regiment, took part in the Kiev offensive and in retreat battles on the Dnieper.

From 16 October 1920, Wir-Konas commanded the 25th Infantry Regiment in Piotrków. In 1921 he completed a course for senior commanders in Warsaw. As part of the military settlement programme, he received a plot of land in the settlement of Krasiczyn in Żabczyce commune.

On 3 May 1922, his rank was verified as lieutenant colonel, with seniority from 1 June 1919 and the 102nd position in the corps of infantry officers. With effect from 1 June 1923, he was transferred to the 84th Polesie Rifle Regiment in Pinsk as regimental commander. On 16 March 1927, he was promoted to colonel, with seniority from 1 January 1927 and the 5th position in the corps of infantry officers.

In January 1930 he was appointed commander of the divisional infantry of the 21st Mountain Infantry Division in Bielsko, Silesia.} From 10 November 1932 to 10 August 1933 he attended the seventh course of the Centre for Higher Military Studies.

== Second World War and death ==
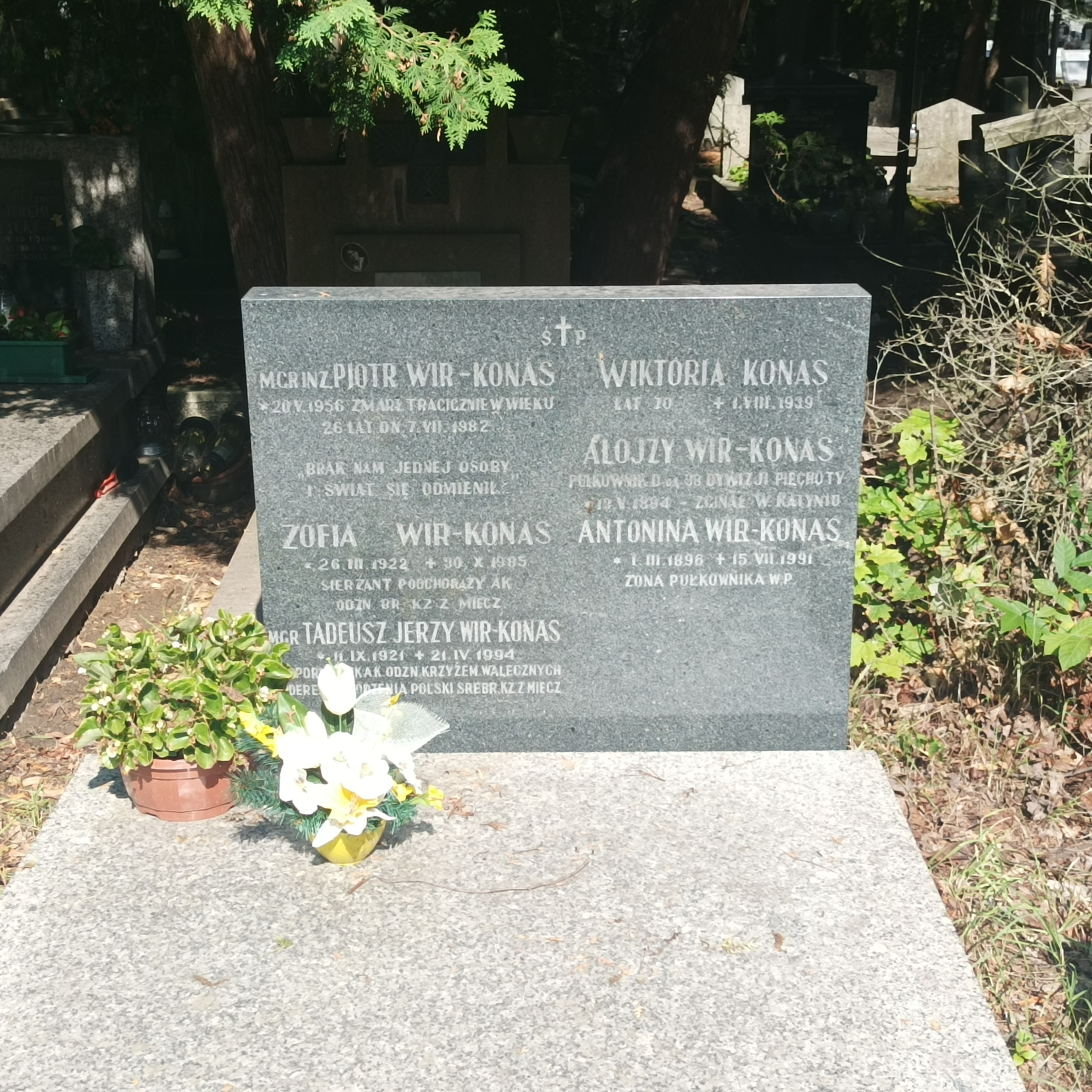
Symbolic grave of Alojzy Wir-Konas at the military cemetery on Prandoty Street in Kraków, military plot 6.

In September 1939, Wir-Konas was appointed commander of the reserve 38th Infantry Division. During the September Campaign, the division was intended for the Commander-in-Chief's "Tarnów" Reserve Group, but the rapid advance of German forces led to its direct incorporation into the Małopolska Army. Together with his units, Wir-Konas fought under the command of Lieutenant General Kazimierz Sosnkowski to break through to besieged Lwów.

Wir-Konas was wounded on 17 September 1939 at Wola Dobrostańska. After the Soviet invasion of Poland, he was taken into Soviet captivity and imprisoned in the camp at Starobielsk. In spring 1940, he was murdered by NKVD personnel in Kharkiv and buried at Piatykhatky. Since 17 June 2000, that site has officially been the location of the Cemetery of the Victims of Totalitarianism in Kharkiv.

By decision no. 112-48-07 of the President of Poland, Lech Kaczyński, dated 5 October 2007, Wir-Konas was posthumously promoted to brigadier general. The promotion was announced on 9 November 2007 in Warsaw during the ceremony Katyń Pamiętamy – Uczcijmy Pamięć Bohaterów ("Katyn, We Remember – Let Us Honour the Memory of the Heroes").

== Family ==
Wir-Konas's wife was Antonina (1896–1991). They had three sons: Tadeusz (1921–1994), Jacek (1925–2002), and Janek.

== Orders and decorations ==
- Silver Cross of the War Order of Virtuti Militari, no. 1744 (28 February 1921)
- Cross of Independence (4 February 1932)
- Cross of Valour, awarded four times; the first and second awards were for service in the Polish Military Organisation in the former Austrian Partition and the former Austrian occupation zone
- Gold Cross of Merit (10 November 1928)
- Commemorative Medal for the War of 1918–1921
- Medal of the Tenth Anniversary of Regained Independence

On 9 May 1938, the Committee of the Cross and Medal of Independence reconsidered his application, but did not award him the Cross of Independence with Swords.

== See also ==
- Polish prisoners-of-war in the Soviet Union after 1939
- Kozelsk, Starobelsk, and Ostashkov camps
- Katyn massacre

== Bibliography ==
- Lista starszeństwa oficerów zawodowych [Seniority List of Professional Officers] (in Polish). Warsaw: Ministerstwo Spraw Wojskowych. 1922.
- Sprawozdanie XI. C. K. Dyrekcyi Gimnazyum Realnego (IV.) w Krakowie za rok szkolny 1911/12 [Report of the Imperial-Royal Directorate of the Real Gymnasium No. IV in Kraków for the 1911/12 school year] (in Polish). Kraków: Nakładem Funduszu Naukowego. 1912.
- Rocznik Oficerski 1932 [Officers' Yearbook 1932] (in Polish). Warsaw: Ministerstwo Spraw Wojskowych. 1932.
- Ciesielski, Jerzy; Gajowniczek, Zuzanna; Przytulska, Grażyna; Roman, Wanda Krystyna; Sawicki, Zdzisław; Szczerkowski, Robert; Szumińska, Wanda (2003). Tucholski, Jędrzej (ed.). Charków. Księga Cmentarna Polskiego Cmentarza Wojennego [Kharkiv: Cemetery Book of the Polish War Cemetery] (PDF) (in Polish). Warsaw: Oficyna Wydawnicza RYTM. ISBN 83-916663-5-2.
