= Xawery Czernicki =

Polish rear admiral (1882–1940)

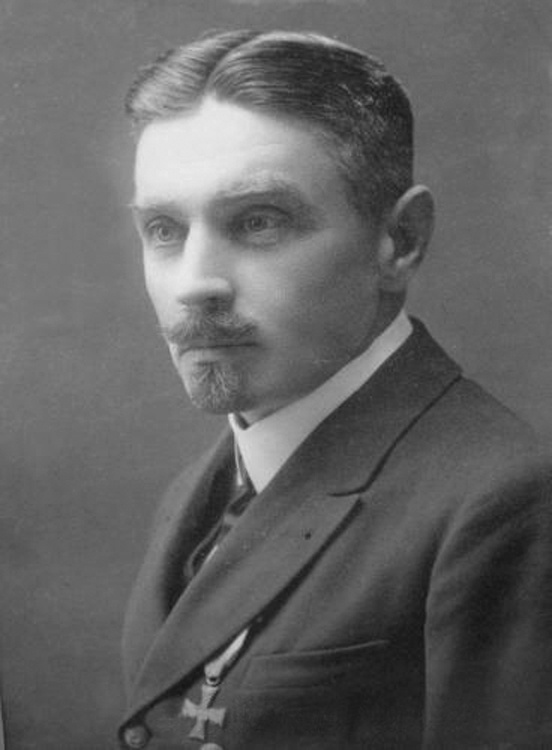
- Born: 16 October 1882; Giedejki (Giedeikiai), Russian Empire (present-day Ashmyany District, Belarus)
- Died: March/April 1940 (age 57); Katyn, Russian SFSR, USSR
- Military career
- Allegiance: Poland
- Service years: 1901–1940
- Rank: Kontradmirał
- Conflicts: World War I; Polish–Soviet War; World War II; Invasion of Poland
- Awards: Officer's Cross of the Order of Polonia Restituta; Officier of the Légion d'honneur (France); Order of St. Anna (Russia); Order of Saint Stanislaus (Russia); Commander of the Order of the Sword (Sweden)(1935); Gold Cross of Merit; Commemorative Medal for War 1918-1921; 10 Years of Independence Commemorative Medal

Rear Admiral Xawery Stanisław Czernicki (1882–1940) was a Polish engineer, military commander and one of the highest-ranking officers of the Polish Navy. Considered one of the founders of Polish Navy's logistical services, he was murdered by the Soviet NKVD in the Katyn massacre.

== Life ==
Xawery Czernicki was born on 16 October 1882 in a szlachta family in the village of Giedejki (Giedeikiai) in the Oshmyansky Uyezd of the Vilna Governorate (present-day Ashmyany District. After graduating from a local gymnasium in 1901, Czernicki joined the Imperial Naval Engineering School in Kronstadt. In 1905 he graduated from the shipbuilding faculty and joined the Russian Navy in the basic officer's rank of michman. The following year he was admitted as the second lieutenant (later first lieutenant) and served as an engineer in the St. Petersburg naval base. In 1910 he became the head of a small naval shipyard in Sretensk (on the Shilka River, Amur basin), where he authored several river monitors. Until 1914 he also served as a deputy engineer and then lead engineer of the Gangut-class battleships Sevastopol and Petropavlovsk. Promoted in 1913 to the rank of captain, until the end of World War I Czernicki served as the lead hull designer in the naval shipyard in Reval (modern Tallinn, Estonia). In 1917 he was promoted to navy lieutenant colonel and the following year he resigned his post.

In 1919 he returned to Poland and volunteered for the Polish Navy. He was admitted as the chief of Technical Services of the Vistulan Flotilla, the first unit of the newly reborn Polish naval forces, created even before Poland regained its Baltic shore. During the Polish-Bolshevik War Czernicki served as the commanding officer of the Modlin Fortress inland naval base. In 1925 he became the head of a commission supervising the construction of Gdynia naval base and the following year he also started to head a commission supervising the construction of ORP Burza, ORP Wicher, ORP Wilk, ORP Ryś and ORP Żbik in France. Promoted to the rank of Komandor, he returned to Poland in 1932 and became the Chief of Services and the Deputy Commander of the Chief of Polish Navy in the Ministry of Military Affairs. In 1938 he was again promoted, this time to the rank of rear admiral.

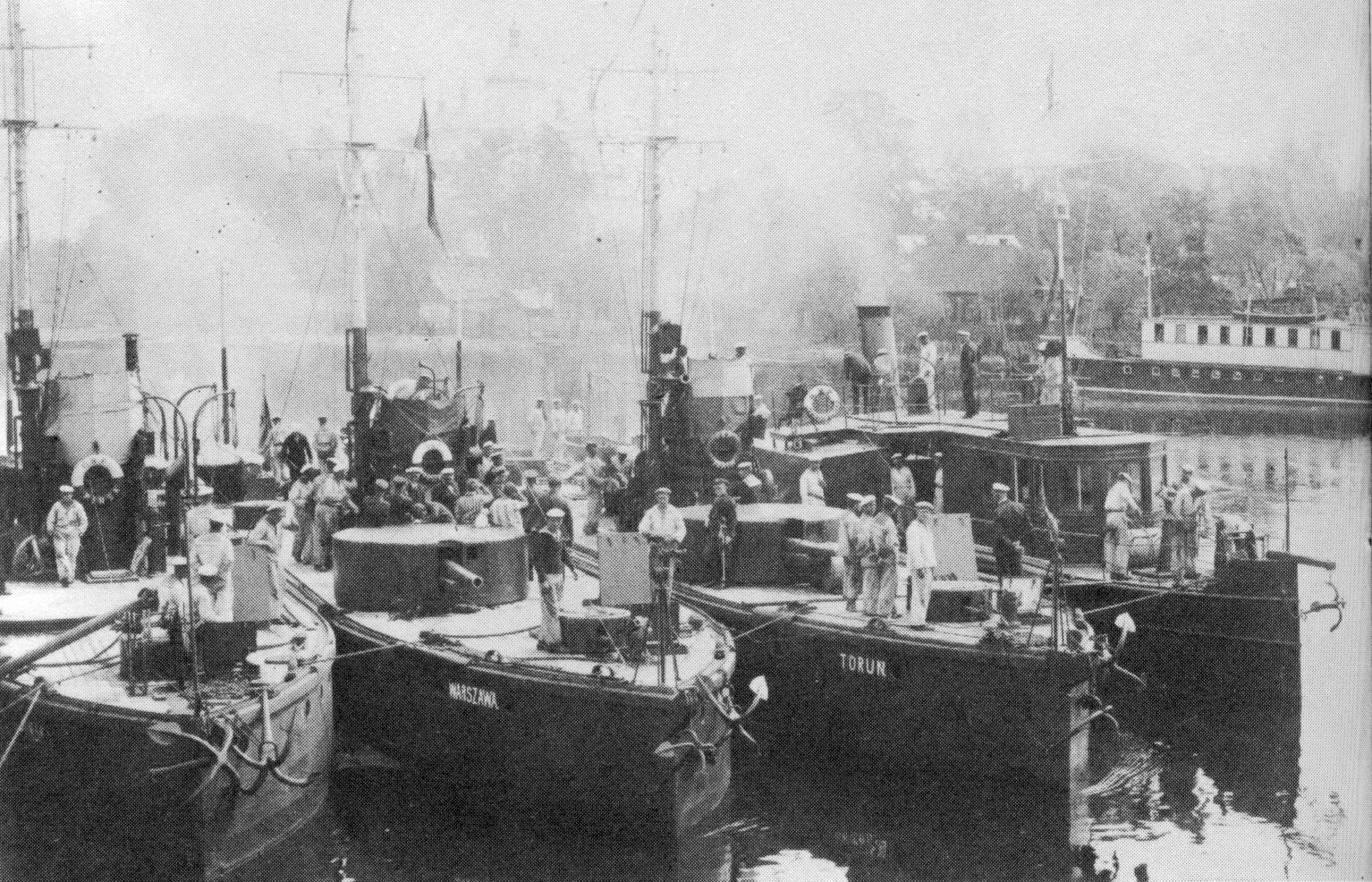
Polish Warszawa-class river monitors in Pińsk, Second Polish Republic. Built before 1926

=== World War II ===
After the invasion of Poland in 1939, Czernicki was evacuated from Gdynia to Warsaw and then eastwards to the area of Pińsk and Brodów. There, in the village of Deraźny, he was ambushed by the Red Army with a group of Polish Navy officers, after the Soviet Union joined Nazi Germany in the invasion of Poland. Transported to Równe (modern Rivne, Ukraine), the officers were arrested by the NKVD and sent to various prisons and camps in the USSR. Czernicki, after a brief stay in Talitsa, was transferred to the NKVD special camp of Kozelsk. He was murdered in the spring of 1940, aged fifty-seven, in what became known as the Katyn massacre.

After the fall on the Soviet Union in 1989, Xawery Czernicki became one of the patrons of the Polish Navy. He is the name-sake of the Polish Navy Depot (1993), the ORP Kontradmirał Xawery Czernicki logistical ship (2001) and the X. Czernicki's Grand Prix prize, awarded every year during the Balt-Military-Expo in Gdańsk.

== Honours and awards ==
- Polonia Restituta (4th Class - Officer's Cross)
- Cross of Merit (1st Class - Gold Cross)
- Commemorative Medal for War 1918–1921
- 10 Years of Independence Commemorative Medal
- Légion d'honneur (France, 4th Class - Officier)
- Order of St. Anna (Russia)
- Order of Saint Stanislaus (Russia)
- Order of the Sword (Sweden, 3rd Class - Commander)

== Sources ==
- Jerzy Przybylski, ed. (2001). Kontradmirał Xawery Stanisław Czernicki. Jerzy Chłopecki, Ryszard Kuraż, Zbigniew Wojciechowski. Gdynia, Museum of the Polish Navy. p. 217. ISBN 83-88698-10-9.
