= Kazimierz Łukoski =

Polish brigadier general (1890–1940)

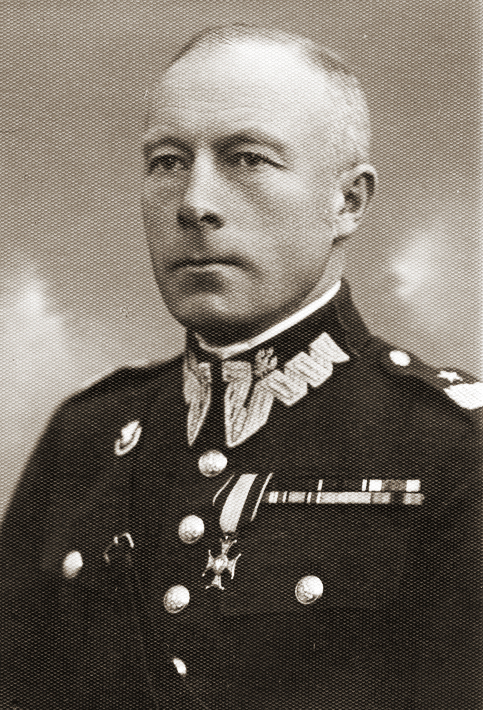
- Born: 13 September 1890; Sokół
- Died: spring 1940; Kharkiv, Soviet Union
- Military career
- Allegiance: Poland
- Rank: Brigadier General

Kazimierz Łukoski, pseudonym "Orlik" (13 September 1890 – spring 1940) was a Polish military commander and one of the Generals of the Polish Army murdered by the Soviet Union in what is collectively called the Katyń massacre of 1940.

== Life ==
He was born in 1890, in the village of Sokół near Garwolin, in the Siedlce Governorate of the Russian Empire (in the Masovian Voivodeship of present-day Poland). After graduating from Wróblewski's School in Warsaw in 1910, he moved to Vienna, where he graduated from the School of Agriculture in 1914. During his studies in the capital of Austria-Hungary, he became involved in the Drużyny Strzeleckie para-military organization and adopted the nom de guerre of Orlik (Polish for lesser spotted eagle), which later formed a part of his surname. At the outbreak of World War I he joined the Polish Legions and became one of its officers. Initially a commanding officer of a battalion of the 3rd Infantry Regiment, he went on to command a battalion in the 2nd Infantry Regiment. Wounded during the battle of Husiatyn of 20 June 1916, he was withdrawn to rear duties. Prior to the Oath Crisis of 1917 he joined the Polnische Wehrmacht, where he became an adjutant to General Felix von Barth and the inspector of training. However, after the crisis he returned to the 2nd Regiment, with which he fought the battle of Rarańcza and crossed the lines to Imperial Russian held part of Ukraine.

There the brigade became part of the Polish 2nd Corps. Łukoski became the commanding officer of the Polish 14th Rifle Regiment within the Polish 4th Rifle Division under Lucjan Żeligowski. After the battle of Kaniów, in which the Corps capitulated, Łukoski broke through the Austrian lines to Kiev, where he became the commander of the recruitment office. A successful commander in the fights around Kuban against the Reds during the Russian Civil War, he went on to command the 2nd Rifle Regiment and then became the chief of staff of the 4th Division. As part of the Józef Haller's Blue Army, in March 1919 Kazimierz Łukoski left Odessa for France, where he became the commander of the Polish 48th Infantry Regiment, with which he returned to Poland.

Initially in garrison duties in Sosnowiec, Łukoski's unit was then moved to Pomerania, at that time being taken over from Germany, and then to the fronts of the Polish-Bolshevik War. During the Kiev offensive Łukoski became the commander of the Polish 21st Infantry Brigade. Shortly before the cease-fire he became the commanding officer of the 22nd Brigade, after which he was attached to the Polish 12th Infantry Division stationed in Tarnopol (modern Ternopil, Ukraine). At that post he served until August 1925. Then he commanded the Bydgoszcz-based Polish 15th Infantry Division (until March 1927) and the Stanisławów-based Polish 11th Infantry Division. Between 1929 and 1930 he received military training at the Ecole Superieure de Guerre in Paris and the Higher War School in Warsaw, and then returned to his previous post in the 11th Division.

During the invasion of Poland of 1939, Kazimierz Łukoski's unit became the core of the newly formed Jasło Operational Group within the Karpaty Army. Captured by the Soviets, he was interned in the NKVD (the Soviet secret police) concentration camp in Starobielsk and then murdered in Kharkov in the spring of 1940, during the Katyn massacre, aged forty-nine.
