= War crimes in occupied Poland during World War II =

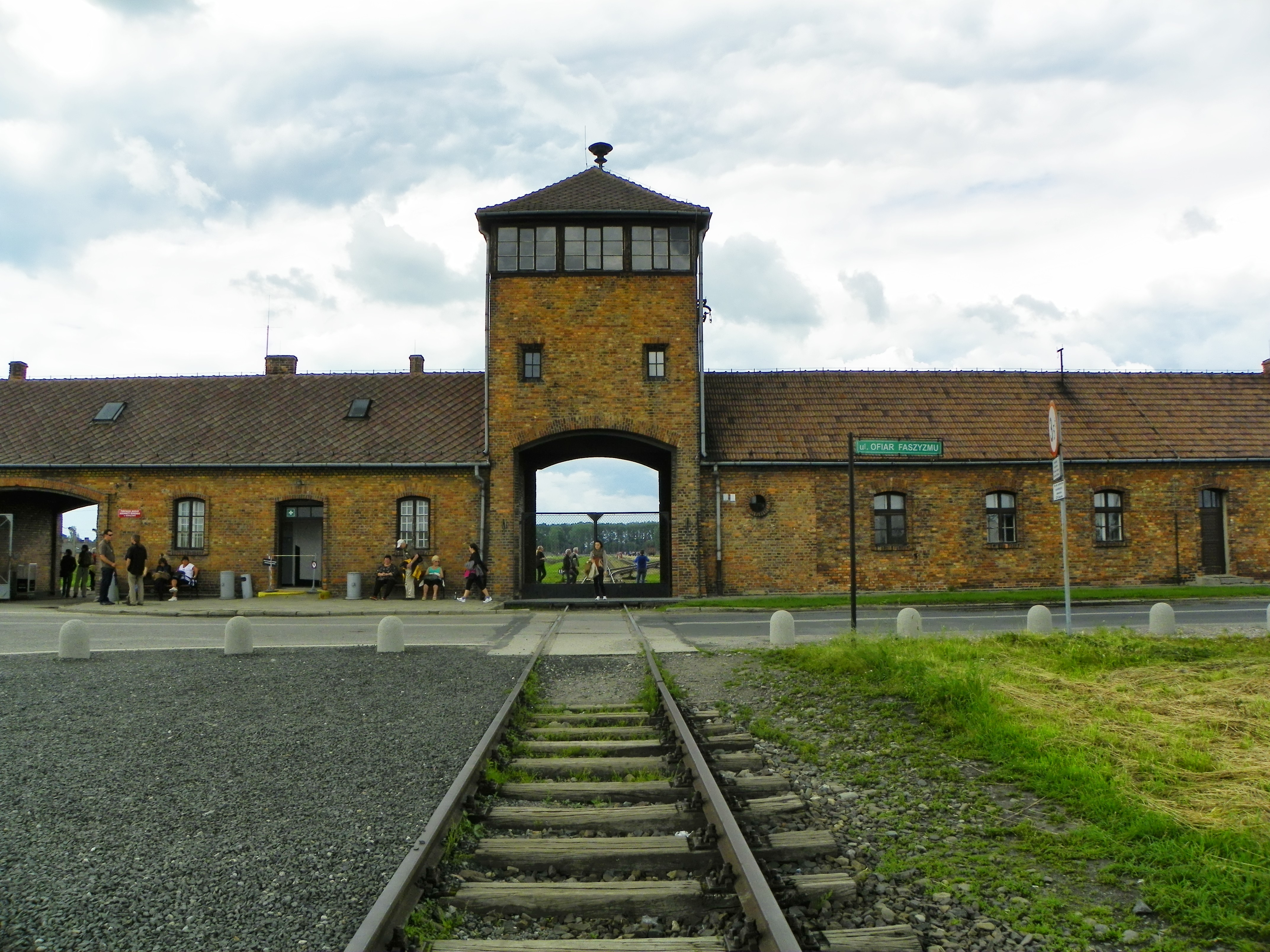
- Auschwitz II-Birkenau
- Date: 1939–1945
- Location: Occupied Poland
- Cause: Invasion of Poland
- Participants: Wehrmacht, Gestapo, SS, Volksdeutscher Selbstschutz, Trawnikis, Sonderdienst, NKVD, SMERSH, Red Army, OUN-UPA, Lithuanian Security Police
- Casualties: Around 5 – 6 million

Around six million Polish citizens are estimated to have perished during World War II. Most were civilians killed by the actions of Nazi Germany, the Soviet Union, the Lithuanian Security Police, as well as the Organization of Ukrainian Nationalists and its offshoots (the Ukrainian Insurgent Army, the Self-defense Kushch Units and the Ukrainian People's Revolutionary Army).

At the International Military Tribunal held in Nuremberg, Germany, in 1945–46, three categories of wartime criminality were juridically established: waging a war of aggression; war crimes; and crimes against humanity. For the first time in history, these three categories of crimes were defined after the end of the war in international law as violations of fundamental human values and norms, regardless of internal (local) law or the obligation to follow superior orders. In subsequent years, the crime of genocide was elevated to a distinct, fourth category.

These crimes were committed in occupied Poland on a tremendous scale, unparalleled elsewhere in Europe.

== German-Soviet partitioning of Poland and cooperation (September 1939 – June 1941) ==
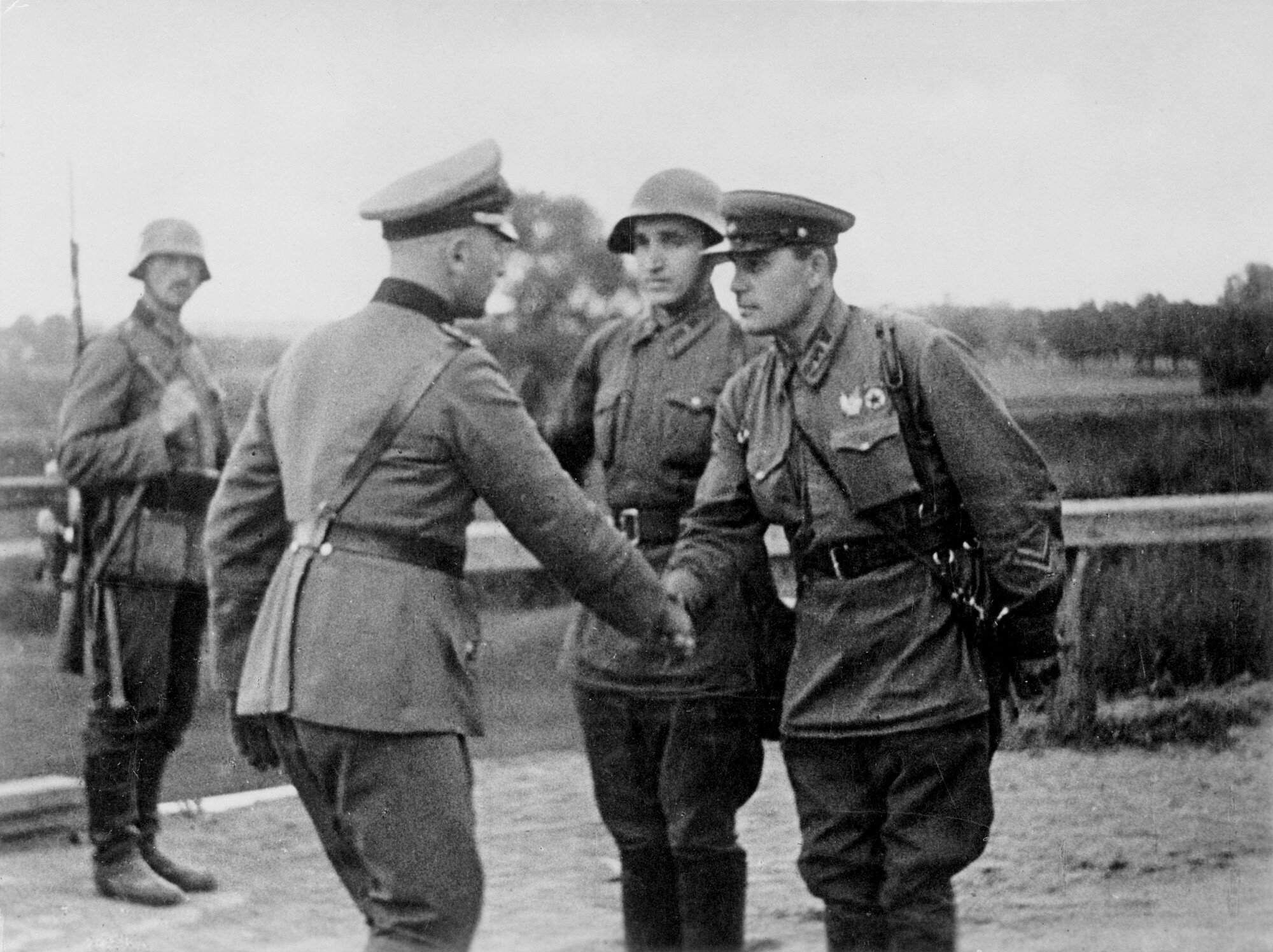
German and Soviet army officers pictured shaking hands; Invasion of Poland, September 1939

Following 1 September 1939 invasion of Poland from the west by Germany, the Soviets attacked from the east on 17 September in accordance with the terms of the Molotov–Ribbentrop Pact, a secret non-aggression agreement signed in August. Within a month, Poland had been divided between two occupational forces, and their joint victory parade was held in Brest-Litovsk. Germany annexed 91,902 km^{2} (35,484 sq mi) with 10 million citizens and controlled the newly created General Government, which consisted of a further 95,742 km (59,491 mi) with 12 million citizens. In total, Germany's zone of occupation consisted of 187,644 km^{2} (72,450 sq mi) with 22 million citizens. The Soviet Union occupied 202,069 km^{2} (78,019 sq mi) with over 13 million citizens. In 1939, the invading forces consisted of 1.5 million Germans and nearly half a million Soviets.

Poland's territory was divided between Nazi Germany and the USSR, and was governed directly by the occupying countries, without establishing any form of Polish collaborating puppet authorities. The occupying powers' actions eclipsed the sovereign Polish state, whose government went into exile, and inflicted massive damage to the country's cultural heritage. Other war crimes against Poland included deportations aimed at ethnic cleansing, imposition of forced labor, pacifications, and genocidal acts. There were many similarities between the two zones of occupations marked by systematic oppression. Both invaders executed Polish civilians and prisoners of war in parallel campaigns of ethnic cleansing, coordinating some of these actions through Gestapo–NKVD conferences. "The scale and extent of the brutality practised in occupied Poland far exceeded anything experienced in other occupied countries."

In the summer and autumn of 1941 the lands annexed in the east by the Soviets, containing large Ukrainian and Belarusian populations, were overrun by Nazi Germany in the initially successful Operation Barbarossa against the Soviet Union.

== Nazi German crimes against the Polish nation ==
=== The invasion of Poland (September 1939) ===
From 1 September 1939, the war against Poland was intended as a fulfilment of the plan described by Adolf Hitler in his book Mein Kampf. The main goal of the plan was to make all of Eastern Europe into the Lebensraum (living space) of Greater Germany. German historian Jochen Böhler observed that the war of annihilation did not begin with the Final Solution, but immediately after the attack on Poland. In order to inspire rage against the Poles and trigger broad public acceptance for total war (that is, war with no legal or moral limitations), the Goebbels propaganda machine soon published and distributed throughout Germany two books based on falsified information: Dokumente polnischer Grausamkeit (Documents of Polish Brutality) and the Polnische Blutschuld (Polish Blood Guilt). A false flag operation, the Gleiwitz incident, was organised by the German agents to serve as the casus belli. Wehrmacht (the German armed forces) was sent out without a formal declaration of war "to kill without mercy and reprieve all men, women and children of the Polish race", as ordered by Adolf Hitler in his speech to military commanders on 22 August 1939. This could be seen as an attempt to destroy the entire nation. The invading Germans believed that the Poles were racially inferior to them.

==== Indiscriminate executions by firing squad ====
From the very beginning of war against Poland, German forces carried out massacres and executions of civilians. Many of these atrocities were not properly researched after the war due to the political divide between Eastern and Western Europe during the Cold War, wrote Böhler. Polish eyewitness accounts do not identify the German units involved; that information is traceable only through German records. Therefore, the crimes committed by the Wehrmacht (the regular German army) were often wrongly attributed to SS operational groups in Polish historiography. It is estimated that there were two hundred executions every day in September 1939. Reinhard Heydrich, head of the Reich Security Main Office, complained that the rate was too slow. Typically, the mass executions were conducted in public spaces such as the town square in order to inflict terror.

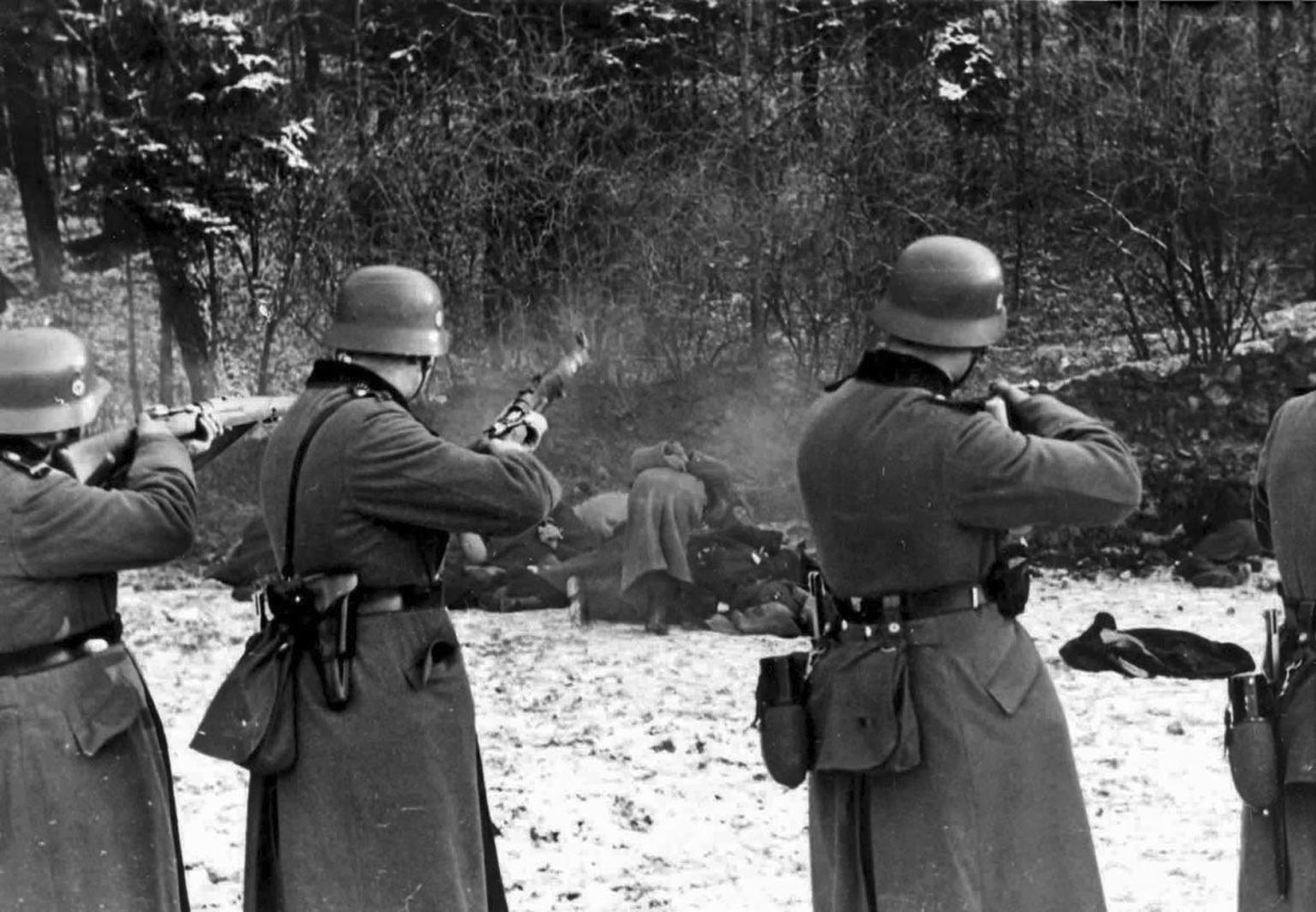
Execution of 56 Polish civilians in Bochnia during the German takeover of Poland, 18 December 1939

Records show that during the German advance across Poland 531 towns and villages were burned. By the end of September 1939 the names of settlements, dates and numbers of civilians executed by the Wehrmacht included: Starogard (2 September), 190 Poles, 40 of them Jews;^{[a]} Świekatowo (3 September), 26 Poles;^{[b]} Wieruszów (3 September), 20 Poles all Jews.^{[c]} On 4 September 1939 the 42nd Infantry Regiment committed the Częstochowa massacre with 1,140 citizens or more, 150 of them Jews, murdered in wild shooting actions in several city locations, leading to a final bloodbath according to Polish reports, involving frightened and inexperienced troops opening machine gun fire at a crowd of 10,000 civilians rounded up as hostages in the Main Square.^{[d]}^{[f]} The official Wehrmacht tally listed only 96 male and 3 female victims of the so-called "anti-partisan" action in the city.

In Imielin (4–5 September), 28 Poles were killed;^{[e]} in Kajetanowice (5 September), 72 civilians were massacred in revenge for two German horses killed by German friendly fire;^{[f]} Trzebinia (5 September), 97 Polish citizens;^{[g]} Piotrków (5 September), Jewish section of the city was set on fire;^{[h]} Będzin (8 September), two hundred civilians burned to death;^{[i]} Kłecko (9–10 September), three hundred citizens executed;^{[j]} Mszadla (10 September), 153 Poles;^{[k]} Gmina Besko (11 September), 21 Poles;^{[l]} Kowalewice (11 September), 23 Poles;^{[m]} Pilica (12 September); 36 Poles, 32 of them Jewish;^{[n]} Mielec (13 September), 55 Jews burned to death;^{[p]} Piątek (13 September), 50 Poles, seven of them Jews;^{[n]} Mień (13 September), 9 Poles; Olszewo (14 September), 13 people (half of the village) from Olszewo and 10 from nearby Pietkowo, Gabrysin and Marynki, along with 30 Polish prisoners of war; Moskwin (14 September), 9 Poles. On 14–15 September about 900 Polish Jews, mostly intelligentsia, were targeted in parallel shooting actions in Przemyśl and in Medyka; this was a foreshadowing of the Holocaust to come.^{[n]} Roughly at the same time, in Solec (14 September), 44 Poles killed;^{[r]} soon thereafter in Chojnice, 40 Polish citizens;^{[s]} Gmina Kłecko, 23 Poles;^{[t]} Bądków, 22 Poles;^{[u]} Dynów, two hundred Polish Jews.^{[w]} Public executions continued well beyond September, including in municipalities such as Wieruszów County, Gmina Besko, Gmina Gidle, Gmina Kłecko, Gmina Ryczywół, and Gmina Siennica, among others.

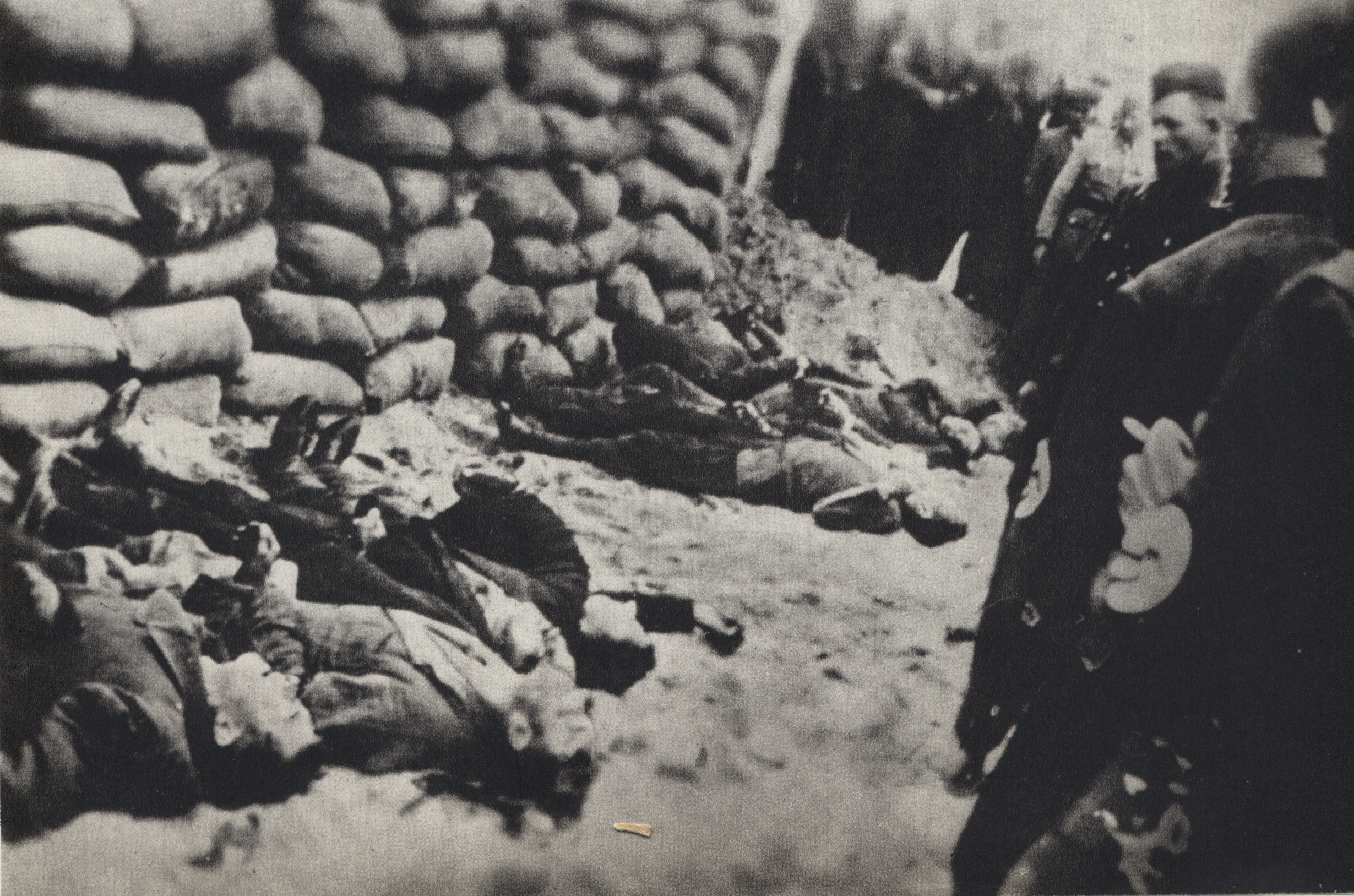
Public execution of 10 Polish hostages by German troops in Gąbin, 15 June 1941

Along with civilians, captured Polish Army soldiers were also massacred. On the very first day of invasion (1 September 1939), Polish prisoners of war (POWs) were murdered by the Wehrmacht at Pilchowice, Czuchów, Gierałtowice, Bojków, Lubliniec, Kochcice, Zawiść, Ornontowice and Wyry; such atrocities would continue throughout the invasion. The German army did not consider captured servicemen to be combatants because they fought differently from them, often avoiding direct confrontation in favor of guerrilla tactics in the face of overwhelming force. Historian Tadeusz Piotrowski estimated over 1,000 POWs were executed by the Wehrmacht, while Timothy Snyder, an American historian wrote that over 3,000 Polish POWs were killed in 63 separate shooting actions in which they were often forced to take their uniforms off, an estimate shared by Jochen Böhler. On top of executions by regular troops, more mass killings were conducted in remote areas by the newly formed Einsatzgruppen totalling 3,000 men aided by the Selbstschutz volunteer executioners, bringing the total number of killing operations to 16,000 before the end of September 1939. Before the end of the year, over 45,000 Poles had been murdered in occupied territories.

==== Bombing campaigns ====
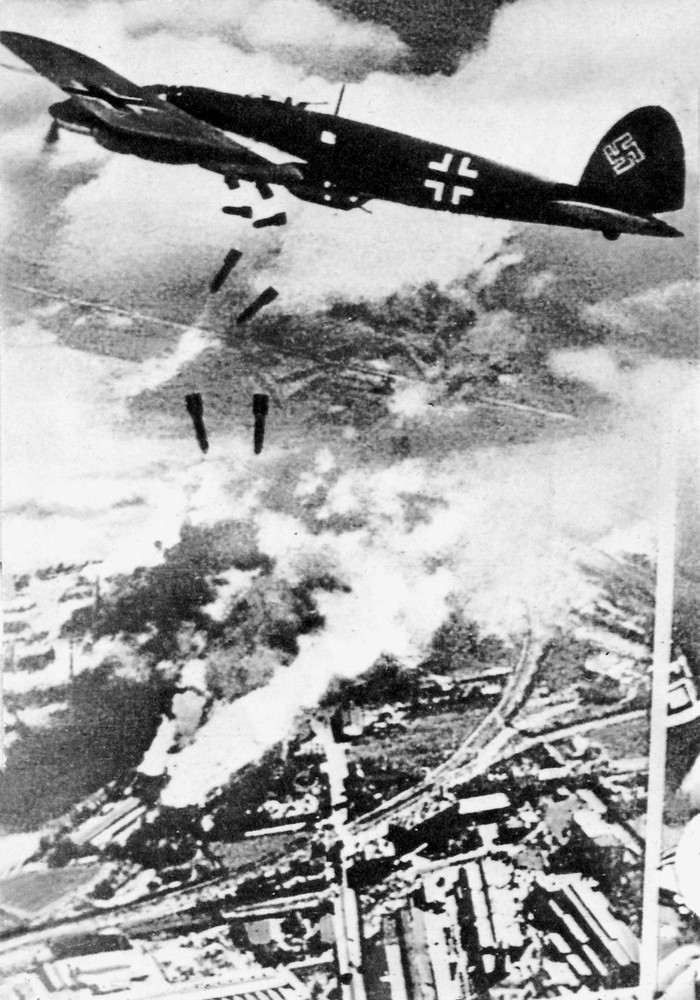
Destruction of Warsaw, during the German aerial bombing campaign against the city, September 1939

The invading German force was equipped with 2000 modern war planes, which were deployed on 1 September 1939 at dawn in Operation Wasserkante, thus opening the September Campaign against Poland; there was no declaration of war. The Luftwaffe's first sorties of the war targeted Polish cities with no military targets of any kind; for example, the city of Wieluń was destroyed almost completely by 70 tonnes of munitions dropped within several hours in spite of the fact that it had no strategic importance to the Germans, and the city of Warsaw was bombed as well.

The Luftwaffe took part in the mass killing by strafing refugees on the road. The number of civilians wounded or killed by aerial bombing is put at over 100,000. The Luftwaffe dropped thousands of bombs on urban centres inhabited only by civilian populations. Amongst the Polish cities and towns bombed at the beginning of war were Brodnica, Bydgoszcz, Chełm, Ciechanów, Kraków, Częstochowa, Grodno, Grudziądz, Gdynia, Janów, Jasło, Katowice, Kielce, Kowel, Kutno, Lublin, Lwów, Olkusz, Piotrków, Płock, Płońsk, Poznań, Puck, Radom, Radomsko, Sulejów, Warsaw, Wieluń, Wilno, and Zamość. Over 156 towns and villages were attacked by the Luftwaffe. Warsaw suffered particularly severely with a combination of aerial bombardment and artillery fire reducing large parts of its historic city centre to rubble. The Soviet Union assisted the Germans by allowing them to use a radio beacon from Minsk to guide their planes.

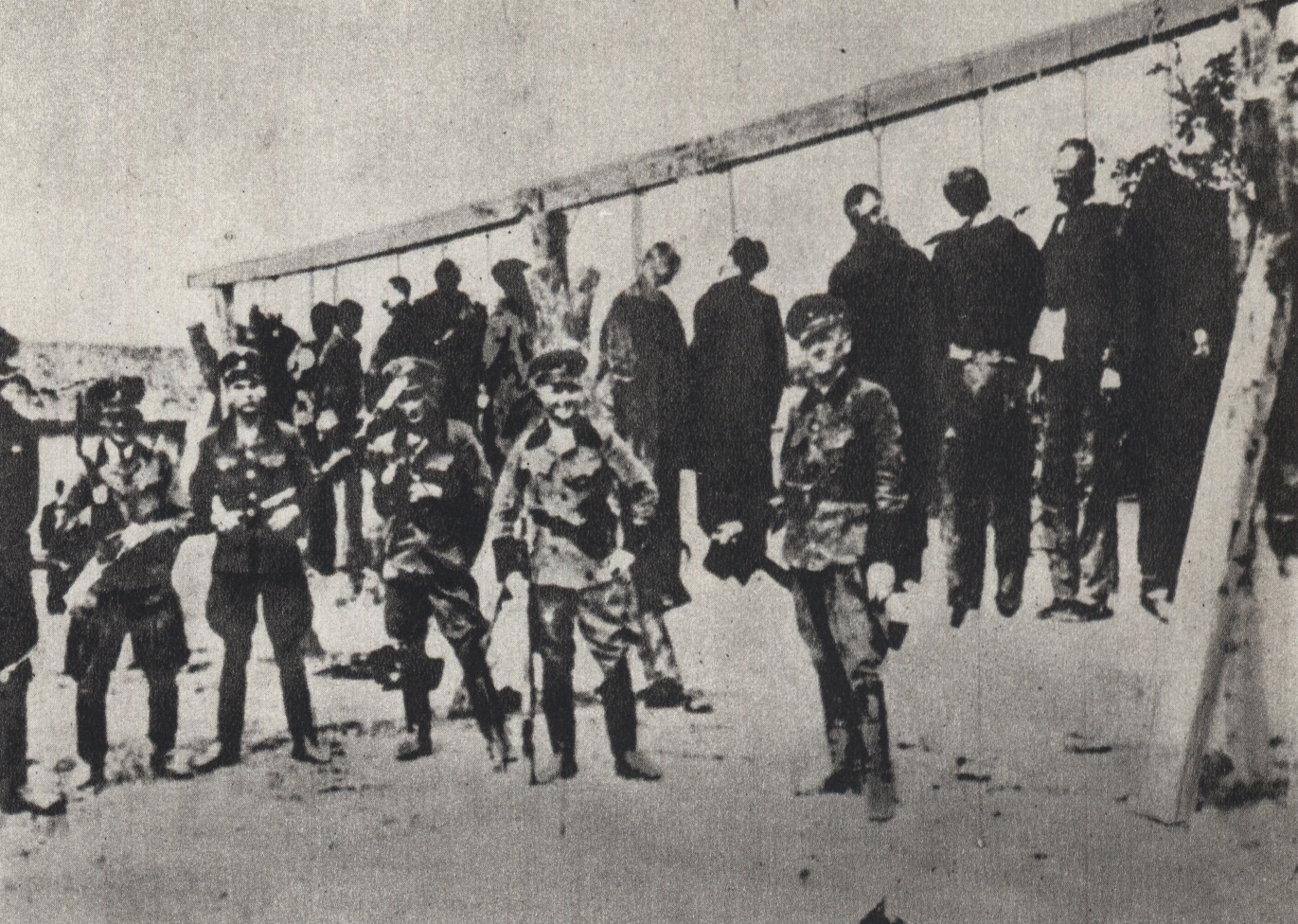
Public execution of Polish citizens by the German SS, during the Nazi occupation of Poland

During the German invasion of Poland, the Einsatzgruppen (special action squads of SS and police) were deployed in the rear and arrested or murdered civilians who were caught offering resistance against the Germans or who were considered to be capable of doing so, as determined by their position and social status.

=== Extermination of Polish intelligentsia ===
==== Unternehmen Tannenberg ====
Immediately after invasion, the Germans employed the earlier prepared Special Prosecution Book-Poland to launch the Operation Tannenberg campaign of mass murders and concentration camps incarcerations. German army units and paramilitary Selbstschutz ("self-defense") forces composed of Volksdeutsche also participated in executions of civilians. The Selbstschutz, along with SS units, took an active part in the mass murders in Piaśnica, in which between 12,000 and 16,000 Polish civilians were murdered. In the city of Bydgoszcz, the Volksdeutscher Selbstschutz (German Fifth Column) attempted to aid the invading German forces by shooting at the Polish Army. A number of saboteurs were executed by the Poles for treason, including for possession of military weapons. The Nazi German government in its own communiqués dubbed the Bydgoszcz incident Bloody Sunday, and claimed the wholesale slaughter of Germans in the city, which was not true. When Bydgoszcz was taken over by the Wehrmacht in October, designated killing squads began murdering civilian Poles in revenge at the Valley of Death (Bydgoszcz); 136 Polish school boys including 12-year-olds with about 6000 others by end of 1939; some 20,000 were murdered in all. Other murder sites included Gniezno, 15 Polish townsmen including Father Zabłocki; Szamotuły (20 October), five Poles in a crowded spectacle at the city centre; Otorowo (7 November), 68 Polish intelligentsia including parish priest and a count; Kościan Leszno, 250 Poles; Śrem, 118 Poles; Wolsztyn, a group of Poles; Kórnik, 16 Polish citizens; Trzemeszno, 30 Polish citizens; Mogilno, 30/39 Poles and a Polish Jew; Antoninek, 20 Polish citizens shot. Other execution sites included Rawicz, Grodzisk Wielkopolski, Nowy Tomyśl, Międzychód, Żnin, Września, Chełmno, Chojnice, Kalisz and Włocławek. More than 16,000 members of the intelligentsia were murdered in Operation Tannenberg alone.

==== Intelligenzaktion, including Intelligenzaktion Pommern and Sonderaktion Krakau ====
Tens of thousands of government officials, landowners, clergy, and members of the intelligentsia–teachers, doctors, journalists, and others (both Poles and Jews) – were either murdered in mass executions or sent to prisons and concentration camps in the Intelligenzaktion (including the Intelligenzaktion Pommern). One of the best-known examples was the deportation to concentration camps in November 1939 of 180 professors from the university of Cracow in the Sonderaktion Krakau.

==== AB-Aktion ====
The German occupiers subsequently launched AB-Aktion in May 1940—a further plan to eliminate the Polish intelligentsia and leadership class, culminating in the Palmiry massacre (December 1940 – July 1941), in which two thousand Poles perished.

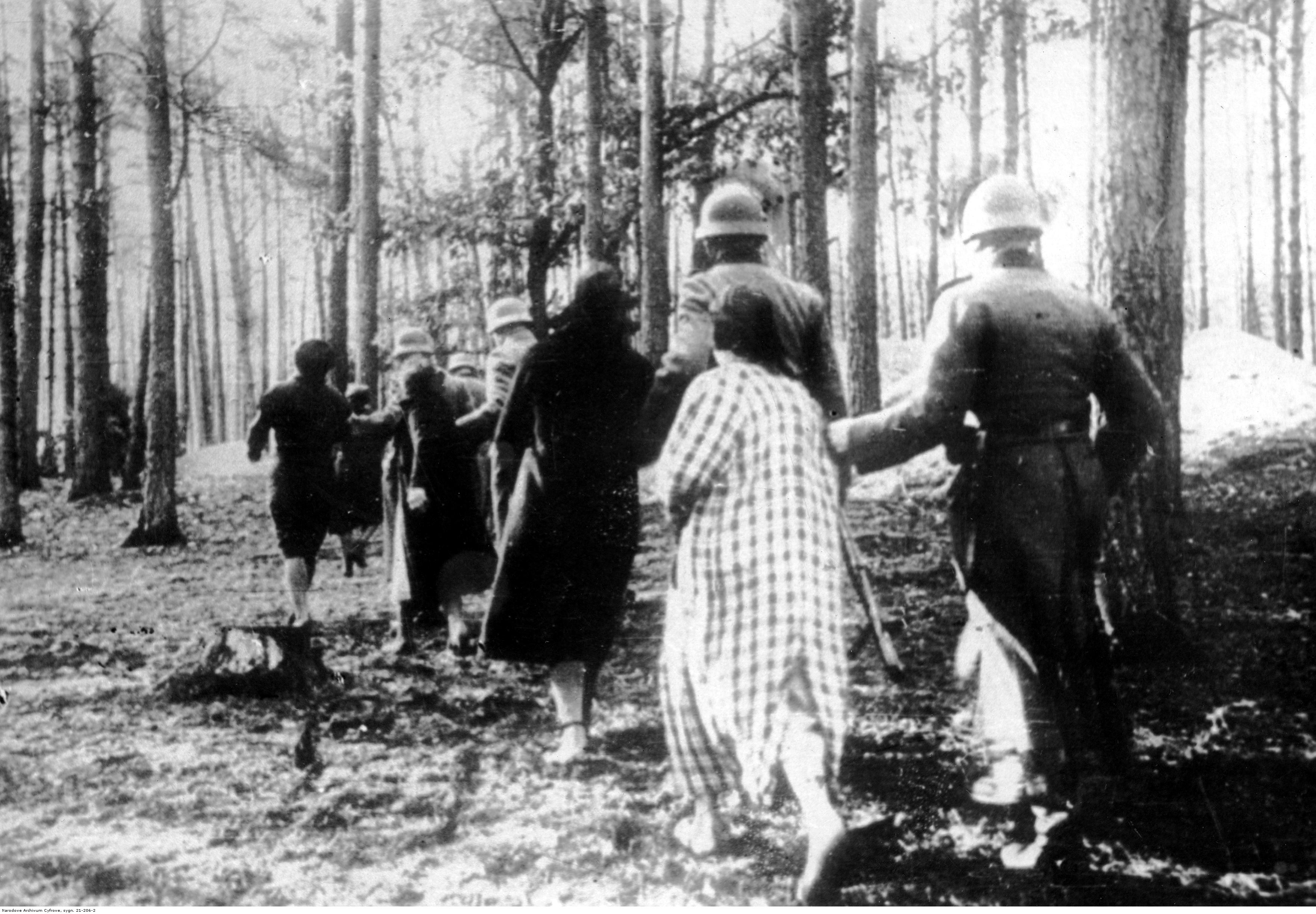
Polish women being led by German soldiers to the execution site; Palmiry, 1940

==== Massacres following the German invasion of Polish territories annexed by the Soviet Union ====
The direct continuation of the AB Action was a German campaign in the east started after the German invasion of the USSR. Among the most notable mass executions of Polish professors was the massacre of Lwów professors, in which approximately 45 professors of the university in Lwów were murdered together with their families and guests. Among those killed in the massacre were Tadeusz Boy-Żeleński, former Polish prime minister Kazimierz Bartel, Włodzimierz Stożek, and Stanisław Ruziewicz. Thousands more perished in the Ponary massacre, the Czarny Las massacre, in the German concentration camps, and in ghettos.

==== "War on the clergy" ====
The Roman Catholic Church was suppressed more harshly than elsewhere in Wartheland, a province created by Nazi Germany after the invasion. Churches were systematically closed and most priests were either murdered, imprisoned, or deported to the General Government. In the General Government, Hans Frank's diary shows he planned a "war on the clergy". The Germans also closed seminaries and convents and persecuted monks and nuns. Between 1939 and 1945, an estimated 2801 members of the Polish clergy were murdered (in all of Poland); of these, 1926 died in concentration camps (798 of them at Dachau). 108 of them are regarded as blessed martyrs, with Maximilian Kolbe being regarded as a saint.

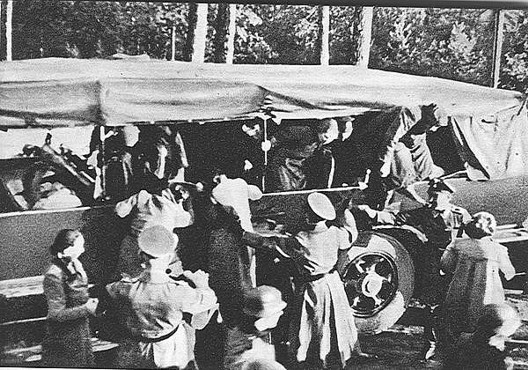
Polish hostages unloaded for mass execution outside of Warsaw. In total about 2,000 Poles were murdered at the site, in secret executions between 7 December 1939 and 17 July 1941

=== German pacification and reprisal massacres ===
The large-scale pacification operations, sometimes called "anti-partisan actions", constituted the core policy of the Nazi regime against Poland and resulted in the death of approximately 20,000 people in less than two years following the invasion. They were mainly conducted in the areas of General Government, Pomerelia, in the vicinity of Wielkopolska, and in the later created Bialystok District.

On 10 September 1939 the policy of collective punishment was introduced, resulting in destruction of villages and towns in the path of Polish defence lines. In Bogusze and in Lipówka in Suwałki County residents were massacred by the Wehrmacht as soon as the Poles retreated. Some 30 other settlements in the vicinity were burned down in the counties of Bielsk, Wysokie Mazowieckie, Suwałki and Łomża, even though there were not used by the retreating Polish forces. Around Białystok 19 villages were completely destroyed. In Pietraszki elderly people and children were fired at from an army tank, while in the villages of Wyliny-Ruś, Drogoszewo and Rutki all civilians were summarily executed, including the elderly.

Terror killings committed by uniformed troops across Poland continued and between 2 October – 7 November 1939, over 8,866 Poles were murdered (53 of them Jews). Among the victims were in Otorowo (20 October), five or 19 Poles shot because a swastika flag was removed by someone; Warsaw (22 November), announcement of the first anti-Jewish legislation: 53 Jews executed in public as punishment for one einheimischen Polizisten (local policeman) assaulted on the street; Wawer (27 December), 106/107 murdered;

By 1943, it was common for the public to be subject to mass murder.

=== Warsaw Uprising massacres ===
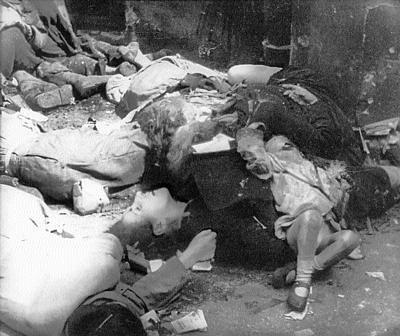
Film footage taken by the Polish Underground showing the bodies of civilians, including children, murdered by SS troops during the Warsaw Uprising, August 1944

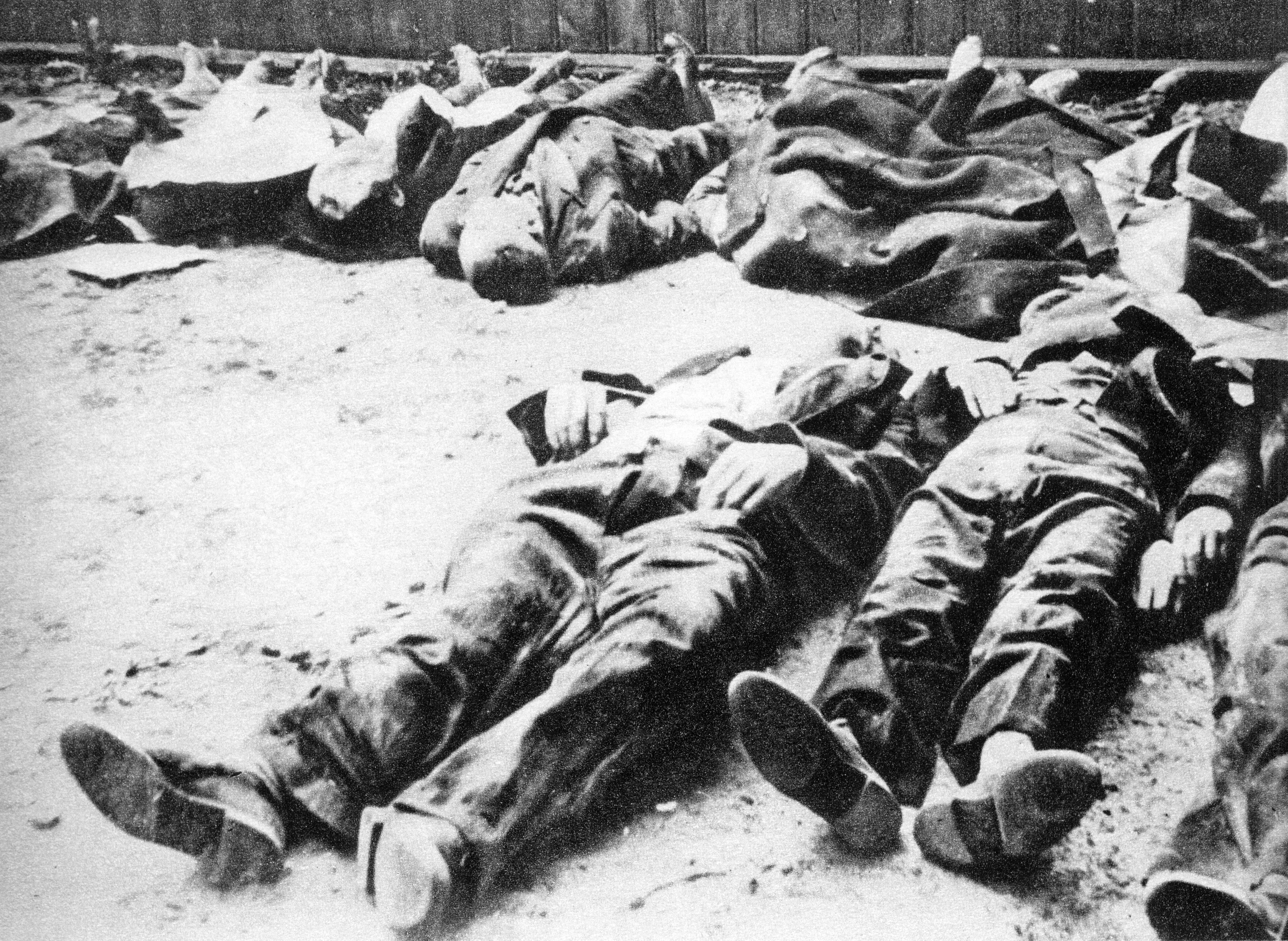
Polish civilians murdered in the Wola massacre. Warsaw, August 1944.

Polish and German historians estimate that during the 1944 Warsaw Uprising up to 200,000 civilians perished. Already in 1944 SS-Gruppenführer Heinz Reinefarth claimed 250,000 dead, which is now considered exaggerated by him for propaganda purposes. Historian Hans von Krannhals claims that at least 10 percent of the victims were killed in mass executions committed by regular German troops, including by Hermann Göring Divisions such as the 1st Infantry Division across Praga, the 2nd Motorized Division in Czerniaków, the 25th Panzergrenadier Division in Marymont as well as the 19th Panzer Division in Praga and Żoliborz districts. The most severe of them took place in the Wola district, where at the beginning of August 1944 tens of thousands of civilians (men, women, and children) were methodically rounded-up and executed by Einsatzkommandos of Sicherheitspolizei operating within the Reinefarth's group of forces under the command of Erich von dem Bach-Zalewski. Executions in the Wola district, referred to as the Wola massacre, also included the killings of both the patients and staff of local hospitals. The victims' bodies were collected and burned under pain of death by the members of the Verbrennungskommando made up of captured Polish men. The carnage was so bad that even the German high command were stunned.

Massacres took place in the areas of Śródmieście (City Centre), Old Town, Marymont, and Ochota districts. In Ochota, civilian killings, rapes, and looting were conducted by the members of Russian SS Sturmbrigade RONA under the command of Bronislav Kaminski and the SS Dirlewanger under the command of Oskar Dirlewanger. Until the end of September 1944, Polish resistance fighters were not considered by the Germans as combatants and were summarily executed when captured. After the fall of the Old Town, during the beginning of September, the remaining 7000 seriously wounded hospital patients were executed or burned alive often with the medical staff who cared for them. Similar atrocities took place later across Czerniaków. Captured insurgents were hanged or otherwise executed after the fall of Powiśle and Mokotów districts as well.

Timeline of civilian massacres during the Warsaw Uprising
2 August 1944	Mokotów Prison on Rakowiecka Street – about 500 prisoners murdered.
2 August 1944	Jesuit monastery on Rakowiecka Street – about 40 Poles murdered, incl. 16 Jesuits.
2 August 1944	Ochota – All hostages executed.
4 August 1944	Ochota – Start of methodical massacre of residents. At Olesińska St. in Mokotów, up to 200 civilians blown up with hand grenades thrown into a single basement.
5 August 1944	Ochota – Beginning of wholesale massacre of Radium Institute patients and personnel – about 170 murdered in total.
5 August 1944	Wola – Beginning of wholesale massacre of residents. In total 10,000, 20,000 or 40,000 residents murdered.
5 August 1944	Wola – Wola Hospital – about 360 patients and personnel murdered.
5 August 1944	Wola – St. Lazarus Hospital – about 1000 patients and personnel murdered.
6 August 1944	Karol and Maria [Szlenkier] Children's Hospital – over 100 patients murdered.
8 August 1944	Old Town – Germans set fire to historic buildings in the Old Town.
10 August 1944	Ochota – Brigade SS-RONA are continuing to kill residents.
28 August 1944	Polish Security Printing Works – Injured, field hospital staff and civilians sheltered in the basement are murdered.
29 August 1944	Various – Germans murder old people and invalids from a captured municipal shelter.
2 September 1944	Warsaw Old Town – 300 patients are murdered.
2 September 1944	Old Town – 7000 civilians are murdered.

More than 200,000 Poles were killed in the uprising. Out of 450,000 surviving civilians, 150,000 were sent to labour camps in Germany, and 50,000 to 60,000 were shipped to death and concentration camps.

=== Leveling of Warsaw following the fall of the Uprising ===
The atrocities preceded the planned destruction of Warsaw by Hitler who threatened to "turn it into a lake". After the rising had ended, the Germans continued to systematically destroy the city. The city was left in ruins. Neither von dem Bach-Zalewski nor Heinz Reinefarth faced a trial for their actions in the Warsaw Uprising.

=== Extermination of psychiatric patients ===
In July 1939, a Nazi secret program called T-4 Euthanasia Program was developed in Germany with the intention of murdering physically or mentally disabled people. The program was put into practice in the occupied territories during the invasion of Poland. Initially, it was implemented according to the following plan: a German director took control over the psychiatric hospital; under the threat of execution no patient could be released; all were counted and transported from the hospital by trucks to an unknown destination. Each truck was accompanied by soldiers from special SS detachments who returned without the patients after a few hours. The patients were said to be transferred to another hospital, but evidence showed otherwise. The first action of this type took place on 22 September 1939 in Kocborowo at a large psychiatric hospital in the Gdańsk region. A firing squad murdered six hospital employees, including a deputy director, along with their patients. By December, some 1800 patients from Kocborowo had been murdered and buried in the Forest of Szpęgawsk. In total, 7000 victims were buried there. Another extermination action took place in October 1939 at a hospital in Owińska near Poznań where 1000 patients (children and adults) were murdered, with 200 more executed a year later.

In addition to executions by firing squad, other methods of mass murder were implemented for the first time at the hospital in Owińska. Some 400 patients, along with medical staff, were transported to a military fortress in Poznań where, in Fort VII bunkers, they were gassed with carbon monoxide delivered in metal tanks. Other Owińska hospital patients were gassed in sealed trucks by exhaust fumes. The same method was performed in Kochanówek Hospital near Łódź, where 2200 persons were killed between March–August 1940. This was the first successful test of mass murder using gas van poisoning and this technique was later used and perfected on many other psychiatric patients in occupied Poland and Germany. Starting in 1941, gas vans were used on inmates of the extermination camps. The total number of psychiatric patients murdered by the Nazis in occupied Poland between 1939 and 1945 is estimated to be more than 16,000, with an additional 10,000 patients dying of malnutrition and hunger. Additionally, approximately 100 out of 243 members of the Polish Psychiatric Association met the same fate as their patients.

=== Cultural genocide ===
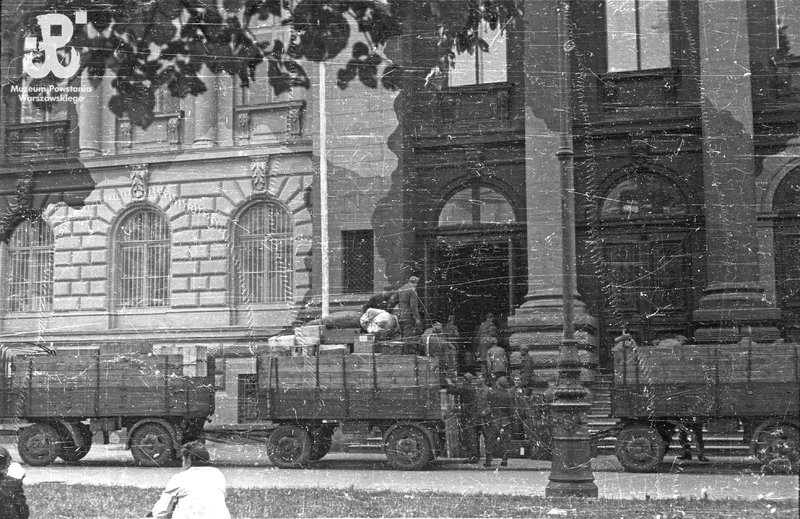
Germans looting the Zachęta National Gallery of Art and Museum in Warsaw, summer 1944

As part of the concerted effort to destroy Polish cultural heritage, the Germans closed universities, schools, museums, public libraries, and dismantled scientific laboratories. They tore down monuments to national heroes. Leading Polish academic institutions were reestablished as German. By the end of 1942 over 90 percent of the world-class art previously in Poland – as estimated by the German officials – was put into their own possession. The Polish language had been banned in Wartheland; children were forced to learn the basics of German under harsh physical punishment. To prevent the emergence of a next generation of educated Poles, German officials decreed that the schooling of Polish youth would end at the elementary level.

A basic issue in the solution of all these problems is the question of schooling and thus the question of sifting and selecting the young. For the non-German population of the East there must be no higher school than the four-grade elementary school. The sole goal of this school is to be-- Simply arithmetic up to 500 at the most; writing of one's name; the doctrine that it is a divine law to obey the Germans and to be honest, industrious, and good. I don't think that reading is necessary.

— Himmler's secret memorandum "Reflections on the Treatment of Peoples of Alien Races in the East"

In his capacity as Reich Commissioner, Heinrich Himmler oversaw the kidnapping of Polish children to be Germanised. Historians estimate that between 50,000 and up to 200,000 Polish children were taken from their families during the war. They were sent to farms and families in the Reich never to return. Many of the children remained in Germany after the war unaware of their true origin.

=== Ethnic cleansing, expulsions, exploitation, segregation and discrimination of Poles ===
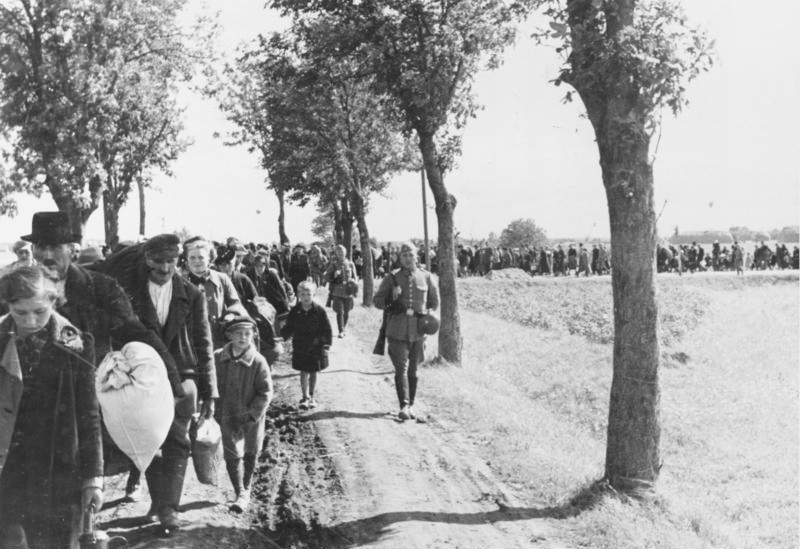
Mass expulsion of Poles, as part of the German ethnic cleansing of western Poland annexed to the Reich, 1939

At the end of October 1939, the Germans introduced the death penalty for active disobedience to the German occupation. Plans for mass expulsions and the system of slave labour camps for up to 20 million Poles were made. Himmler thought of moving all Poles to Siberia. In May 1940 he wrote a memorandum; in it, he promised to eventually deport all Poles to the east. Most of them were intended to die during the cultivation of the swamps.

The Germans planned to change ownership of all property in the land incorporated directly into the Third Reich. In a speech to German colonists, Arthur Greiser said: "In ten years there will not even be a peasant smallholding which will not be in German hands". In the Wartheland, the Nazi goal was complete Germanization. The formerly Polish territories were to become politically, culturally, socially, and economically German. The Nazis closed elementary schools where Polish was the language taught. Streets and cities were renamed (Łódź became Litzmannstadt, etc.). Tens of thousands of Polish enterprises from large industrial firms to small shops, were seized without payment to the owners. Signs posted in public places warned: "Entrance forbidden for Poles, Jews, and dogs." The forced resettlement affected two million Poles. In the severe winter of 1939–40 families were made to leave behind almost everything without any recompense. As part of Operation Tannenberg alone, 750,000 Polish peasants were forced out of their homes which were levelled, and the land given to German colonists and servicemen. A further 330,000 were murdered.

==== Roundups of Poles for forced/slave labour or for keeping as hostages ====
All Polish males were required to perform forced labour. Between 1939 and 1945, at least one and a half million Polish citizens were detained and transported to the Reich for forced labour against their will. One estimate has one million (including POWs) from annexed lands and 1.28 million from the General Government. The Polish Ministry of Foreign Affairs believes the figure was more than two and half million during the war. The Gentile population of Polish metropolitan cities was targeted for enslavement in the łapanka actions, in which the detachments of SS, Wehrmacht and police rounded up civilians after cordoning off streets. Between 1942 and 1944 in Warsaw, approximately 400 Poles were captured in łapankas every day. Many were teenage boys and girls. Although Germany also used forced labourers from Western Europe, Poles, along with other Eastern Europeans viewed as inferior, were subject to especially harsh discriminatory measures. They were forced to wear identifying purple Ps sewn to their clothing, subjected to a curfew, and banned from public transport. While the treatment of factory workers or farm hands often varied depending on the individual employer, Polish labourers as a rule were compelled to work longer hours for lower wages than Western Europeans, and in many cities, they were forced to live in segregated barracks behind barbed wire. Social relations with Germans outside work were forbidden and sexual relations with them were considered "racial defilement", punishable by death. During the war, hundreds of Polish men were executed for their relations with German women.

==== Forced labour camps ====
The camp system where Poles were detained, imprisoned and forced to labour, was one of fundamental structures of the Nazi regime, and with the invasion of Poland became the backbone of German war economy and the state organized terror. It is estimated that some five million Polish citizens went through them.

The incomplete list of camp locations with at least one hundred slave labourers, included in alphabetical order: Andrychy, Antoniew-Sikawa, Augustów, Będzin, Białośliwie, Bielsk Podlaski, Bliżyn, Bobrek, Bogumiłów, Boże Dary, Brusy, Burzenin, Chorzów, Dyle, Gidle, Grajewo, Herbertów, Inowrocław, Janów Lubelski, Kacprowice, Katowice, Kazimierza Wielka, Kazimierz Dolny, Klimontów, Koronowo, Kraków-Podgórze, Kraków-Płaszów, Krychów, Lipusz, łysaków, Miechowice, Mikuszowice, Mircze, Mysłowice, Ornontowice, Nowe, Nowy Sącz, Potulice, Rachanie, Słupia, Sokółka, Starachowice, Swiętochłowice, Tarnogród, Wiśnicz Nowy, Wierzchowiska, Włoszczowa, Wola Gozdowska, Żarki, and Zarudzie.

=== Concentration camps ===
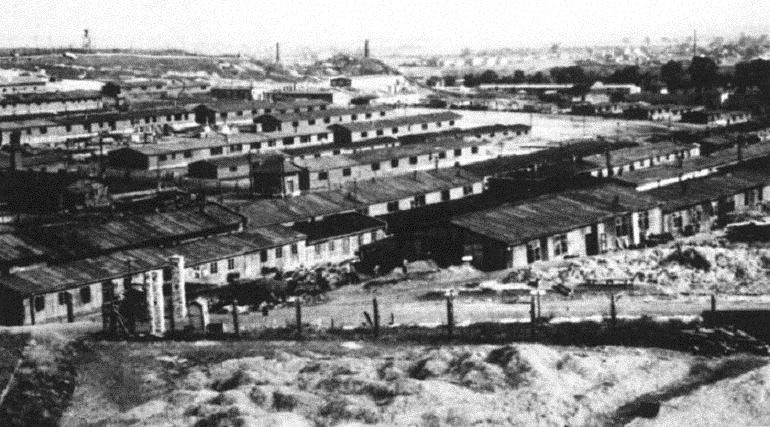
Płaszów concentration camp outside Kraków, 1942

Citizens of Poland, but especially ethnic Poles and Polish Jews, were imprisoned in nearly every camp of the extensive concentration camp system in German-occupied Poland and in the Reich. A major labour camp complex at Stutthof, east of Gdańsk/Danzig was begun as an internment camp in September 1939. An estimated 20,000 Poles died there as a result of hard labour, executions, disease and starvation. Some 100,000 Poles were deported to Majdanek concentration camp with subcamps in Budzyn, Trawniki, Poniatowa, Kraśnik, Puławy, as well as the "Airstrip", and Lipowa added in 1943. Tens of thousands of prisoners died there. An estimated 20,000 Poles died at Sachsenhausen outside Poland, 20,000 at Gross-Rosen, 30,000 at Mauthausen, 17,000 at Neuengamme, 10,000 at Dachau, and 17,000 at Ravensbrück. In addition, tens of thousands of Polish people were executed or died in their thousands at other camps, including special children's camps such as in Łódź and its subcamp at Dzierżązna, in prisons and other places of detention inside and outside Poland.

The Auschwitz I concentration camp went into operation on 14 June 1940. The first transport of 728 Polish prisoners consisted mostly of schoolchildren, students and soldiers from the overcrowded prison at Tarnów. Within a week another 313 arrived. There were 1666 major transports in August and 1705 in September. This Polish phase of Auschwitz lasted until the middle of 1942. By March 1941, 10,900 prisoners were registered at the camp, most of them Poles.

The most notorious concentration camps in occupied Poland as well as along Nazi German borders included: Gross-Rosen in Silesia, now part of Poland, Janowska, Kraków-Płaszów, Poniatowa (reassigned from forced labour camp), Skarżysko-Kamienna, Soldau, Stutthof, and Trawniki.

=== Massacres and death marches during German retreat ===
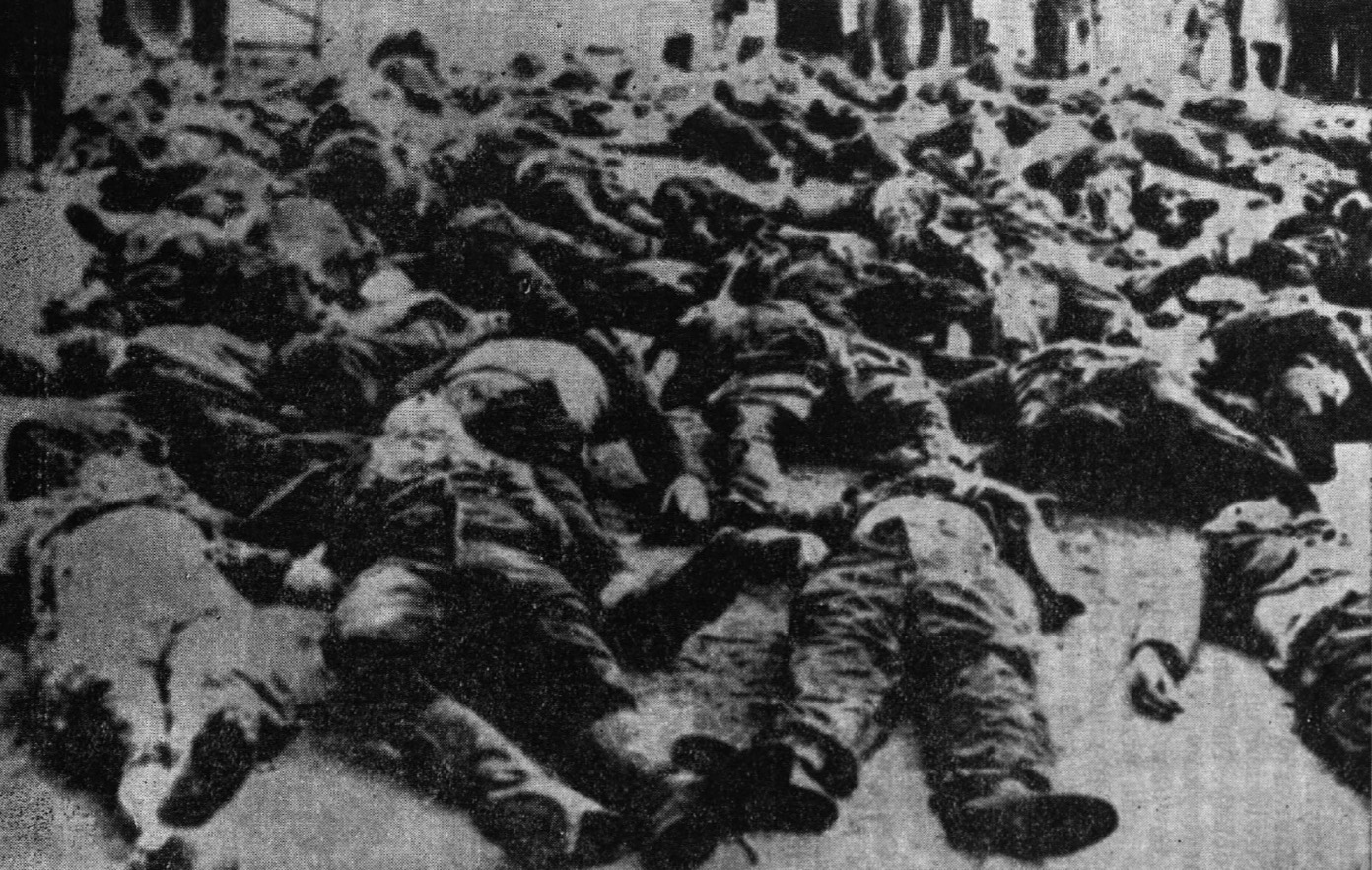
Victims of a massacre perpetrated by the Germans shortly before their withdrawal from Lublin, 1944

During the cold winter of 1944–1945 and temperatures dropping below −20 °C (−4 °F), the Germans perpetrated death marches of prisoners of various nationalities from concentration camps, forced labour camps and prisoner-of-war camps.

In 1945, during the German retreat, the Gestapo, Wehrmacht and Waffen-SS carried out further massacres and executions of Polish civilians, such as in Chojnice (18 January 1945; 800 victims), Wieniec-Zdrój (18 January; nine victims), Płock (19 January 1945; 79 victims), Ostrzeszów (20 January 1945; 14 victims), Pleszew (21 January 1945), Marchwacz (22 January 1945; 63 victims).

== The Final Solution and the Holocaust in German-occupied Poland ==
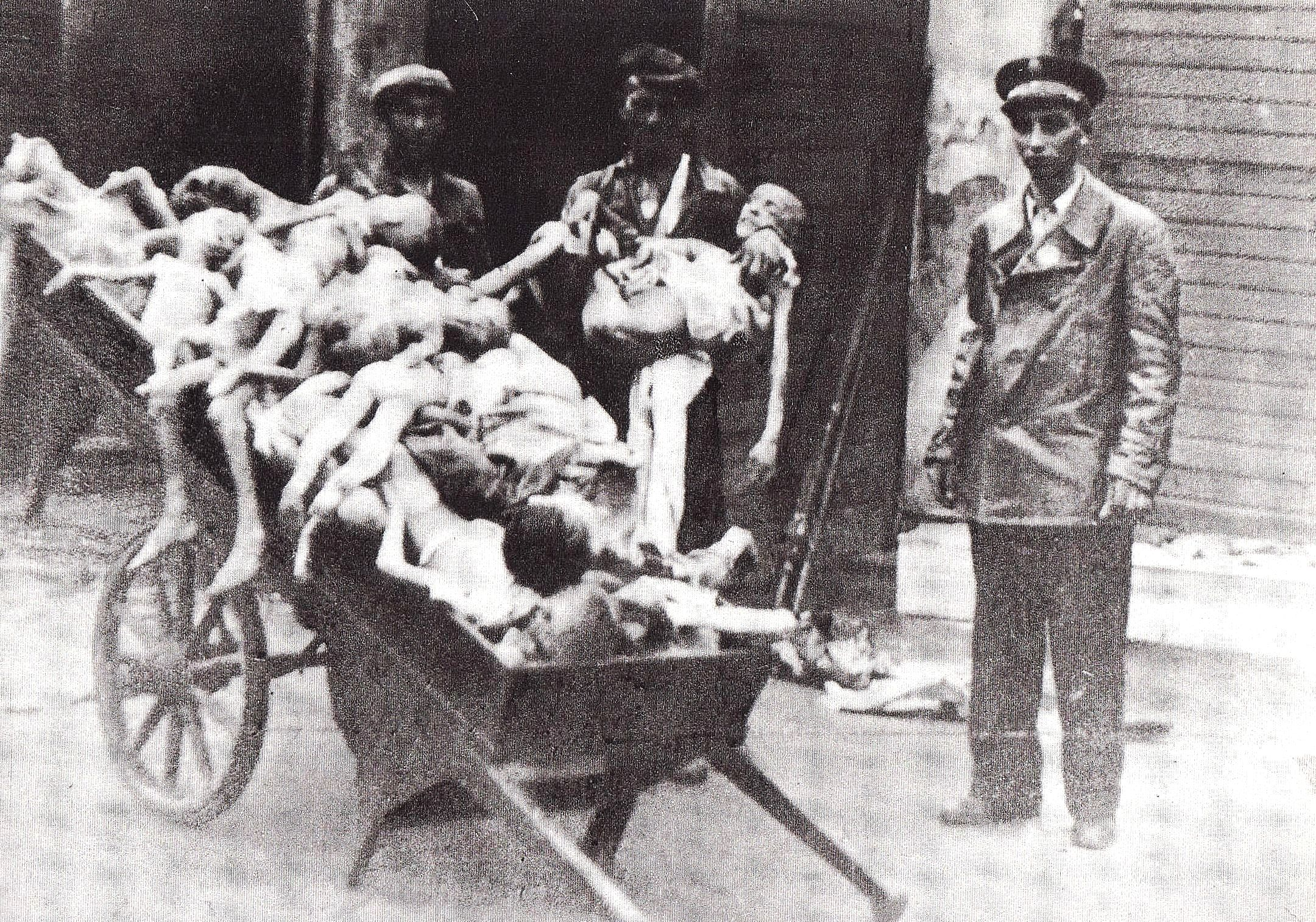
Emaciated corpses of children in Warsaw Ghetto

=== Treatment of Polish Jews under German occupation prior to the Holocaust ===
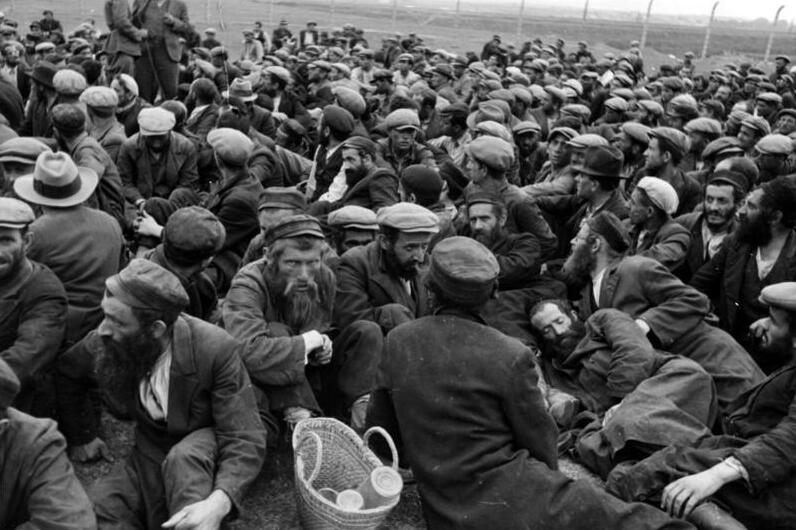
Captive Jews from Kraków Ghetto await slave labour on an open field behind barbed wire, 1939

While ethnic Poles were usually subject to selective persecution in an effort to discourage them from resisting the Germans, all ethnic Jews were targeted from the outset. During the first 55 days of the occupation approximately 5,000 Polish Jews were murdered. As of 12 November 1939, all Jews over the age of 12, or 14, were forced to wear the Star of David. They were legally banned from working in key industries and in government institutions; to bake bread, or to earn more than 500 zlotys a month. Initially, the Jews were murdered at a lower rate than ethnic Poles.

==== Jewish ghettos ====
At the beginning of the occupation, Jews were treated differently as they were gathered together into ghettos in the cities. Himmler ordered all Jews in the annexed lands to be deported to central Poland. In winter 1939–40, about 100,000 Jews were deported. Inside occupied Poland, the Germans created hundreds of ghettos in which they forced Jews to live. These World War II ghettos were part of the German official policy of removing Jews from public life. The combination of excess numbers of inmates, unsanitary conditions and lack of food resulted in a high death rate among them. The first ghetto was established in October 1939 at Piotrków. Initially the ghettos were open but on 1 May the Łódź ghetto was closed by Germans sealing the Jews inside. The Warsaw Ghetto was closed in November 1940. The Germans started a reservation for Jews near Lublin.

The Germans tried to divide the Poles from the Jews using several laws. One law was that Poles were forbidden from buying from Jewish shops; if they did so, they were subject to execution. Maria Brodacka was the first Pole to be murdered by the Germans for helping a Jew. The Germans used the incident to murder 100 Jews being held as hostages. At the start of the war 1335 Poles were murdered for sheltering Jews.

From 1940 to 1944, it is estimated that starvation and disease caused the death of 43,000 Jews imprisoned in the Holocaust ghettos. In the Józefów Massacre, 1500 Jewish men, women, children and elderly, were killed. Most Polish Jews subsequently perished in the German death camps. Towards the end of 1942, the mass extermination of Polish Jews had started with deportations from urban centres to death camps including Jews from outside Poland.

=== Warsaw Ghetto Uprising ===
The Warsaw Ghetto was the largest of the Jewish ghettos located in the territory of General Government during World War II, established by Nazi Germany in Warsaw, the pre-war capital of Poland. Between 1941 and 1943, starvation, disease and mass deportations to concentration camps and extermination camps (mainly the Treblinka extermination camp) during the Gross-aktion Warschau, reduced the population of the ghetto from an estimated 445,000 to approximately 71,000. In 1943 the Warsaw Ghetto was the scene of the Warsaw Ghetto Uprising. The ghetto was reduced to rubble.

=== Extermination camps ===
==== Chełmno, Bełżec, Sobibor, and Treblinka ====
The first German murder camp in occupied Poland was established in late 1941 at Chełmno (renamed Kulmhof) in annexed lands. The new killing method originated from the earlier practise of gassing thousands of unsuspecting hospital patients at Hadamar, Sonnenstein and other euthanasia centres in the Third Reich, known as Action T4. In Chełmno extermination camp, the SS Totenkopfverbände used mobile gas vans to murder mostly Polish Jews imprisoned at the Łódź Ghetto (Litzmannstadt in German). At least 152,000 people were gassed at Chełmno according to postwar verdict by West Germany, although up to 340,000 victims were estimated by the Polish Main Commission for Investigation of German Crimes in Poland (GKBZNwP), a predecessor of the Institute of National Remembrance.

Following the Wannsee Conference of 1942, as part of highly secretive Operation Reinhard in occupied Poland, the German government built three regular killing centres with stationary gas chambers in the General Government. It was the most deadly phase of the Final Solution, based on implementing semi-industrial means of murdering and incinerating people. The new facilities included Treblinka extermination camp (set up in July 1942), Bełżec (March 1942), and Sobibor extermination camp (ready in May 1942). Parallel killing facilities were built at Auschwitz-Birkenau along the already existing Auschwitz I in March 1942, at Majdanek later that year.

==== Auschwitz-Birkenau and Majdanek ====
The first Polish political prisoners began to arrive at Auschwitz I in May 1940. By March 1941, 10,900 were imprisoned there. In September 1941, some 200 ill prisoners, most of them Poles, along with 600 Soviet POWs, were murdered in the first gassing experiments at Auschwitz. Beginning in 1942, Auschwitz's prisoner population became much more diverse, as Jews and other "undesirables" from all over German-occupied Europe were deported to the camp.

About 960,000 Jews were murdered at Auschwitz amongst its 1.1 million victims, including 438,000 Jews from Hungary and 300,000 Polish Jews, 69,000 French Jews, 60,000 Dutch Jews, and 55,000 Greek Jews. The Polish scholar Franciszek Piper, the chief historian of Auschwitz, estimates that 140,000 to 150,000 Poles were brought to that camp between 1940 and 1945, and that 70,000 to 75,000 died there as victims of executions, of medical experiments, and of starvation and disease. There were also hundreds of thousands of victims murdered at concentration camps in Majdanek, Treblinka, and Warsaw.

== Ukrainian nationalist massacres in occupied Poland ==
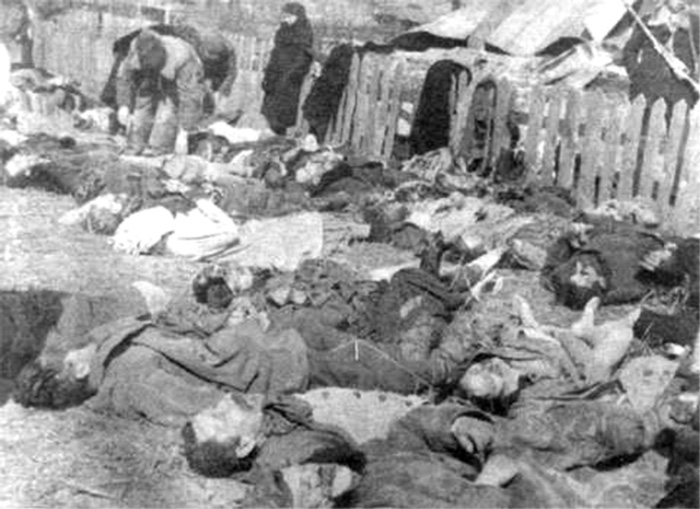
Victims of a massacre committed by the Ukrainian OUN-UPA in Lipniki, Poland, 1943

For many years during the Soviet domination over Communist Poland, the knowledge of Ukrainian massacres of Poles in Volhynia and Eastern Galicia perpetrated against ethnic Poles and Jews, by Ukrainian nationalists and peasants was suppressed for political propaganda reasons. Among the first to suffer mass killings were the units of Polish Army fleeing the German advance in 1939. On top of uniformed men being ambushed, there are records of civilians being murdered along with them, and women raped.

Following the German attack against the USSR, many ethnic Ukrainians viewed Nazi Germany as their liberator, in the hopes of establishing an independent Ukraine. The ethnically motivated killings intensified after the Soviet occupation zone was overrun across the regions of Kresy. Some 200 Polish refugees were murdered at Nawóz. Ethnic Ukrainians were also among the supporters of the rounding up and murdering of Jews.

Numerous sources state that as soon as the Germans advanced toward Lviv, Ukrainian countrymen began to murder Jews in territories with predominantly Ukrainian populations. It is estimated that, in this wave of pogroms across 54 cities, some 24,000 Jews were killed. With many Jews already executed or fleeing, the organized groups of Ukrainian nationalists under Mykola Lebed began to target ethnic Poles, including pregnant women and children.

During the subsequent campaign of ethnic cleansing by Ukrainian nationalists gathered into paramilitary groups under the command of the Ukrainian Insurgent Army (OUN-UPA) and the Organization of Ukrainian Nationalists (OUN-B) partisan groups, some 80,000–100,000 Polish citizens were murdered. Locations, dates and numbers of victims include (in chronological order): Koszyszcze (15 March 1942), 145 Poles plus 19 Ukrainian collaborators, seven Jews and nine Russians, massacred in the presence of the German police; Antonówska (April), nine Poles; Aleksandrówka (September), six Poles; Rozyszcze (November), four Poles; Zalesie (December), nine Poles; Jezierce (16 December), 280 Poles; Borszczówka (3 March 1943), 130 Poles including 42 children killed by Ukrainians with the Germans; Pienki, Pendyki Duze & Pendyki Male, three locations (18 March), 180 Poles; Melnytsa (18 March), about 80 Poles, murdered by Ukrainian police with the Germans; Lipniki (25 March), 170 Poles; Huta Majdanska (13 April), 175 Poles; Zabara (22–23 April), 750 Poles; Huta Antonowiecka (24 April), around 600 Poles; Klepachiv (5 May), 42 Poles; Katerburg (7–8 May), 28 Poles, ten Polish Jews and two mixed Polish-Ukrainian "collaborator" families; Stsryki (29 May), at least 90 Poles; Hurby (2 June), about 250 Poles; Górna Kolonia (22 June), 76 Poles; Rudnia (11 July), about 100 Poles; Gucin (11 July), around 140, or 146 Poles; Kalusiv (11 July), 107 Poles; Wolczak (11 July), around 490 Poles; Orzesyn (11 July), 306 Poles; Khryniv (11 July), around 200 Poles; Zablocce (11 July), 76 Poles; Mikolajpol (11 July), more than 50 Poles; Jeziorany Szlachecki (11 July), 43 Poles; Krymno (11 July), Poles gathered for church mass murdered; Dymitrivka (22 July), 43 Poles; Ternopil (August), 43 Poles; Andrzejówka (1 August), 'scores' of Poles murdered; Kisielówka (14 August), 87 Poles; Budy Ossowski (30 August), 205 Poles including 80 children; Czmykos (30 August), 240 Poles; Ternopol (September), 61 Poles; Beheta (13 September), 20 Poles; Ternopil (October), 93 Poles; Lusze (16 October), two Polish families; Ternopil (November), 127 Poles, a large number of nearby settlements destroyed; Stezarzyce (6 December), 23 Poles; Ternopil (December), 409 Poles; Ternopil (January 1944), 446 Poles.

It is estimated that anywhere between 200,000 and 500,000 civilians of all ethnic backgrounds died during the OUN-UPA ethnic cleansing operations in eastern Poland. Some Ukrainians also collaborated as Trawniki guards at the concentration and extermination camps, most notably at Treblinka.

Some Poles also murdered ethnic Ukrainians in retaliation, as in the case of Pawłokoma.

== Lithuanian collaboration and atrocities during World War II ==
Lithuanian authorities had been aiding Germans in their actions against Poles since the very beginning of German occupation in 1941, which resulted in the deaths of thousands of Poles. Thousands of Poles were killed by Lithuanian collaborators working with Nazis (like the German subordinated Lithuanian Security Police or the Lithuanian Territorial Defense Force under the command of general Povilas Plechavičius, many more were deported into Germany as slave labour.) Tadeusz Piotrowski notes that thousands of Poles died at the hand of Lithuanian collaborators, and tens of thousands were deported.

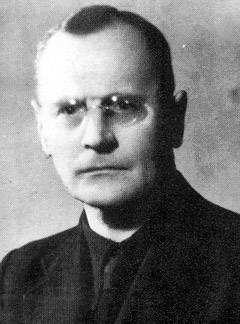
Aleksander Krzyżanowski

In autumn 1943 Armia Krajowa started operations against the Lithuanian collaborative organization, the Lithuanian Security Police, which had been aiding Germans in their operation since its very creation. Polish political and military underground cells were created all over Lithuania, Polish partisan attacks were usually not only in Vilnius Region but across the former demarcation line as well. Soon a significant proportion of AK operations became directed against Nazi Germany allied Lithuanian Police and local Lithuanian administration. During the first half of 1944 AK killed hundreds of Lithuanians serving in Nazi auxiliary units or organizations: policemen, members of village self-defence units, servants of local administration, soldiers of the Lithuanian Territorial Defense Force and other Nazi collaborators. Civilians on both sides increasingly numbered among the casualties.

In response, Lithuanian police, who had murdered hundreds of Polish civilians since 1941, increased its operations against the Poles, executing many Polish civilians; this further increased the vicious circle and the previously simmering Polish–Lithuanian conflict over the Vilnius Region deteriorated into a low-level civil war under German occupation. The scale of disruption grew over time; Lithuanian historian Stanislovas Buchaveckas noted, for example, that AK was able to paralyze the activities of many Lithuanian educational institutions in 1943.

In May 1944, in the battle of Murowana Oszmianka AK dealt a significant blow to the Lithuanian Territorial Defense Force which has been terrorizing local Polish population. At that time, Aleksander Krzyżanowski, AK commander of Vilnius region, commanded over 9000 armed Armia Krajowa partisans.

There are also claims of smaller scale killings of ethnic Lithuanians. On 23 June 1944, in response to an earlier massacre on 20 June of 37 Polish villagers in Glitiškės (Glinciszki) by Lithuanian Security Police rogue AK troops from the unit of the 5th Vilnian Home Army Brigade (under the command of Zygmunt Szendzielarz "Łupaszko" who was not present at the events) committed a massacre of Lithuanian policemen and civilians, at Dubingiai (Dubinki), where 27 Lithuanians, including women and children, were murdered. These rogue units were acting against specific orders of Krzyżanowski which forbade reprisals against civilians In total, the number of victims of Polish revenge actions at the end of June 1944 in Dubingiai and neighbouring towns of Joniškis, Inturkė, Bijutiškis, and Giedraičiai, was 70–100 Lithuanians, including many civilians. The Massacre at Dubingiai was the only known massacre carried out by units of AK. Further escalation by either side was cut short by the Soviet occupation of Vilnius region two weeks later.

== Nazi German crimes against foreign nationals in occupied Poland ==
Nazi Germany also committed crimes against citizens of other countries deported to occupied Poland, especially Soviet and Italian prisoners of war, who were deliberately neglected and starved, deprived of rudimentary sanitation and medical care, resulting in numerous epidemics, or executed. There were even cases of cannibalism among Soviet POWs due to starvation, as recorded in Stalag 342 in Mołodeczno. Jews and communists among Soviet POWs were mostly executed, with some deported to concentration camps, whereas at Stalag 328 they were imprisoned without any food to starve to death. The largest number of victims, at least tens of thousands each, were in camps Stalag 307, Stalag 319, Stalag 328 and Stalag I-F. Mass executions of Italian POWs were carried out in the Stalag 319 and Stalag 327 camps. There were also cases of killings of French, Belgian and Dutch POWs for escape attempts.

== Soviet war crimes against Poland ==
=== Soviet invasion of Poland ===
Amongst the first to suffer mass repressions at the hands of the Soviets were the Border Defence Corps. Many officers were murdered by the NKVD secret police immediately after capture. Polish General Olszyna-Wilczyński was shot without due process at the moment of his identification. In the Wilno area all higher officers of the Polish Army died in captivity, the same as in Polesie, where 150 officers were already executed even before the remainder were taken prisoner. Uniformed men captured in Rohatyń were murdered along with their wives and children.

On the Ukrainian front 5264 officers (including ten generals), 4096 non-commissioned officers and 181,223 soldiers were taken into captivity. Polish regular troops in Lviv, including police forces, voluntarily laid down their arms after agreeing to the Soviet terms for surrender, which offered them the freedom to travel to neutral Romania and Hungary. The Russian leadership broke the agreement entirely. All the Polish servicemen were arrested and sent to the Soviet POW camps, including 2,000 army officers. In the subsequent wave of repressions which lasted for twenty-one months (see: Operation Barbarossa) some 500,000 Poles dubbed "enemies of the people" were imprisoned without crime.

=== Katyn massacre of Polish military echelon by the NKVD ===
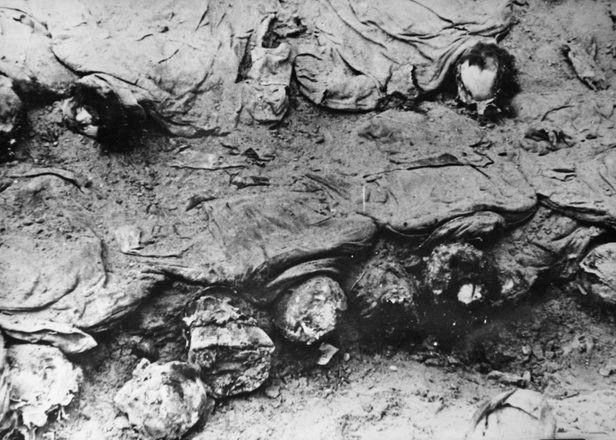
Exhumation of the Katyń forest massacre victims in 1943; murdered by the Soviet NKWD three years earlier in the spring of 1940

Following the invasion, in April and May 1940 the NKVD secret police perpetrated the single most notorious wartime atrocity against any prisoners of war held by the Soviet Union. In the Katyn massacre nearly twenty-two thousand Polish nationals were murdered in mass executions simultaneously. They included army officers, political leaders, civil servants, government officials, intellectuals, policemen, landowners, and scores of ordinary soldiers. The Katyn Forest near Smolensk, Russia, was the primary execution site where 4,443 officers (the entire Polish military echelon in the custody of the Soviets), were murdered by the Soviet secret police. The name Katyn is now associated with the systematic execution of up to 21,768 Polish citizens in several locations ordered through a single document, including at the Kozelsk prisoner-of-war camp as well as the Starobelsk and Ostashkov camps.

Among the victims of the massacre were 14 Polish generals, including Leon Billewicz, Bronisław Bohaterewicz, Xawery Czernicki (admiral), Stanisław Haller, Aleksander Kowalewski, Henryk Minkiewicz, Kazimierz Orlik-Łukoski, Konstanty Plisowski, Rudolf Prich (murdered in Lviv), Franciszek Sikorski, Leonard Skierski, Piotr Skuratowicz, Mieczysław Smorawiński and Alojzy Wir-Konas (promoted posthumously).

=== Soviet deportations as a means of ethnic cleansing ===
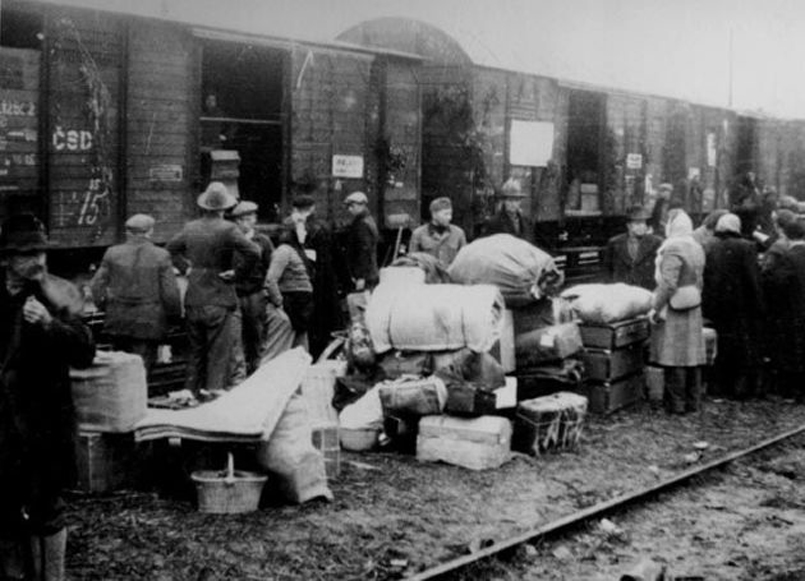
Polish families deported during the Soviet occupation of Kresy. The number of Poles extracted from their homes and sent into barren land in Siberia exceeded 1.6 million

An estimated 1.2 to 1.7 million Polish nationals (entire families with children, women, men, and elderly) were loaded onto freight trains and deported to the eastern parts of the USSR, the Urals, and Siberia. The Soviets used against Poles the same process of subjugation used against their own citizens for many years beforehand, especially mass deportations. In 1940 and the first half of 1941, the Soviets removed Poles from their homes in four major waves. The first deportation action took place from 10 February 1940 on, with more than 220,000 victims, sent to northern European Russia; the second, on 13–15 April 1940, affected 300,000 to 330,000 Poles, sent primarily to Kazakhstan. The third wave, in June–July 1940, totalled 240,000–400,000 victims. The fourth wave took place in June 1941, deporting 200,000 Poles including a large number of children.

On top of deporting Polish citizens en masse, the Soviets forcibly drafted Polish men into the Red Army. It is estimated that 210,000 young Polish males were conscripted as newly declared Soviet subjects following the annexation of Kresy.

=== Cultural and economic destruction of Kresy ===
The invading Soviets set out to remove Polish cultural influences from the land under concocted premises of class struggle and dismantle the former Polish system of administration. All Polish nationals in occupied territories were declared to be citizens of the Soviet Union starting on 29 November 1939. Many Polish social activists and community leaders were eliminated through judicial murder, the unjustified use of capital punishment. Captured Poles were transported to Soviet Ukraine where most of them were executed in the dungeons of the NKVD in Kharkiv, the second largest city in Ukraine.

Religious education was forbidden. Schools were forced to serve as tools of communist indoctrination. Monuments were destroyed (for example, in Wołczyn, the remains of King Stanisław August Poniatowski were ditched), street names changed, bookshops closed, libraries burned and publishers shut down. Collections from Tarnopol, Stanisławów and Sokal were transported to Russian archives. Taxes were raised and religious institutions were forced to close. The Soviets replaced the zloty with the rouble, but gave them blatantly absurd equal value. Businesses were mandated to stay open and sell at pre-war prices, hence allowing Soviet soldiers to buy goods with roubles. Entire hospitals, schools and factories were moved to the USSR. Soviet censorship was strictly enforced. Even the ringing of church bells was banned.

=== Ethnic tensions ===
The Polish territories were split between the Ukrainian and Byelorussian SSRs with Ukrainian and Belarusian declared as the official languages in local usage, respectively. Some Polish citizens of various ethnic backgrounds (i.e. Belarusians and some Jews) welcomed the Soviet invasion in the hope of gaining political concessions and actively cooperated with the Soviets. This resulted in retaliatory actions following Operation Barbarossa, including the Jedwabne pogrom (or Jedwabne massacre) of Jewish people living in and near the town of Jedwabne in Bezirk Bialystok, that took place in July 1941. The official investigation of the Polish Institute of National Remembrance confirmed that the crime was "committed directly by Poles, but inspired by the Germans".

=== Soviet NKVD prisoner massacres, June–July 1941 ===
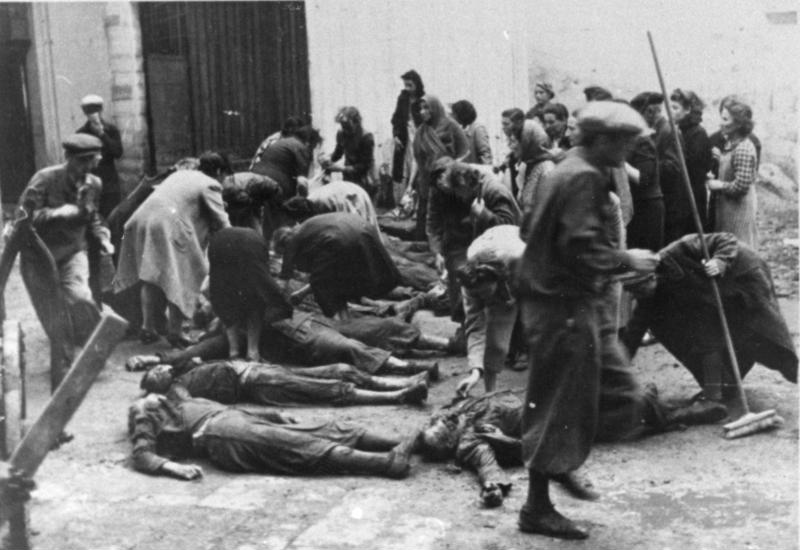
Victims of the Soviet NKVD in Tarnopol, July 1941

Following the German attack on the Soviet Union on 22 June 1941, Operation Barbarossa, the Soviet NKVD (Secret Police) panicked and executed their prisoners en masse before retreating in what became known as the NKVD prisoner massacres. The most conservative estimate puts death toll in the prisons at up to 30,000, although there may have been as many as 100,000 victims of the Soviets as they retreated. The British intelligence officer and postwar historian George Malcher puts the total at 120,000 for those killed in NKVD prisons and during the Soviet flight. Stalin ordered the execution of those believed to have spied on the Soviet Union, which meant practically everyone for the secret police operatives.

According to the NKVD records, nearly 9,000 prisoners were murdered in the Ukrainian SSR in these massacres. Due to the confusion during the rapid Soviet retreat and incomplete records, the NKVD number is most likely an undercounting. According to estimates by contemporary historians, the number of victims in the territories previously annexed to Soviet Ukraine (eastern Galicia, western Polesia, and western Volhynia) was probably between 10,000 and 40,000. By ethnicity, Ukrainians comprised roughly 70 per cent of victims, with Poles at 20 per cent and the rest being Jews and other nationalities.

The Soviets left thousands of corpses piled up in prison yards, corridors, cells, basements, and NKVD torture chambers, as discovered by the advancing Germans in June–July 1941. The following is a partial list of prisons and other secret execution places, where mass murder took place; compiled by historian Tadeusz Piotrowski, and others.

In eight pre-war Polish voivodeships, the number of dead was between 32,000 and 34,000. The locations in alphabetical order included: Augustów prison: (with 30 bodies); Berezwecz: (with 2000, up to 3000 dead); Białystok: (with hundreds of victims); Boryslaw, (dozens); Bóbrka: (9–16); Brzeżany: (over 220); Busk: (about 40); Bystrzyca Nadwornianska, Cherven, Ciechanowiec: (around 10); Czerlany: (180 POWs); Czortków, Dobromil: (400 murdered); Drohobycz: (up to 1000); Dubno: (around 525); Grodno: (under 100); Gródek Jagiellonski: (3); Horodenka, Jaworów: (32); Kałusz, Kamionka Strumilowa: (about 20); Kołomyja, Komarno, Krzemieniec: (up to 1500); Lida, Lwów (over 12,000 murdered in 3 separate prisons); Łopatyn: (12); Łuck: (up to 4000 bodies); Mikolajów, Minsk: (over 700); Nadworna: (about 80); Oleszyce, Oszmiana: (at least 60); Otynia: (300); Pasieczna, Pińsk: ("dozens to hundreds"); Przemyślany: (up to 1000); Równe: (up to 500); Rudki: (200); Sambor: (at least 200, up to 720); Sarny: (around 90); Sądowa Wisznia: (about 70); Sieniatycze: (15); Skniłów: (200 POWs); Słonim, Stanisławów: (about 2800); Stryj: (at least 100); Szczerzec: (about 30); Tarasowski Las: (about 100); Tarnopol: (up to 1000); Wilejka: (over 700); Wilno: (hundreds); Włodzimierz Wołynski, Wołkowysk: (seven); Wołożyn: (about 100); Wolozynek, Zalesiany, Zaleszczyki, Zborów: (around 8); Złoczów: (up to 750); Zółkiew: (up to 60) and Zydaczów.

It was not only prisoners who were murdered by the NKVD as the Soviets retreated. Other Soviet crimes include Brzeżany, where Soviet soldiers threw hand grenades into homes, and Czortków, where four priests, three brothers and a tertiary were murdered.

=== Deliberate halting of offensive against Germany during the Warsaw Uprising ===
The role of Soviets is debated by historians. Questions are asked about the Soviet political motives in halting their advance on the city during the uprising, thus allowing for the destruction to continue, and denying the use of their airfields to the Royal Air Force and United States Army Air Forces.

=== The end of German rule and the return of the Soviets (January 1945) ===
With the return of the Soviets, the killings and deportations started again. Stalin turned his attention to the Armia Krajowa (Home Army) which was seen as an obstacle in Soviet goals of controlling Poland hence the NKVD set out to destroy them. The Poles were accused of having Germans spies in their ranks, trying to take control of the Polish units fighting along with the Red Army, and causing desertions. Home Army units which fought against the Germans in support of the Soviet advance had their officers and men arrested. At Wilno and Nowogrodek, the Soviets shipped to concentration camps 1500 officers and 5000 troops.

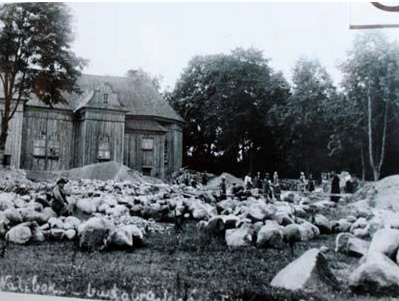
Naliboki before the Soviet invasion of Poland at the onset of World War II

The Home Army was made illegal. As a result, it is estimated up to 40,000 Home Army partisans were persecuted and many others deported. In the Lublin area more than 50,000 Poles were arrested between July 1944 and June 1945. It is suspected that the NKVD carried out killings in the Turza Wood where 17 bodies have been found, although witnesses put the total at 600. At Baran Wood, 13 bodies have been found but witnesses again claimed hundreds. Records show that 61 death sentences were carried out plus 37 in October 1944 alone.

==== Internment of Polish nationals ====
Upon the conclusion of World War II, Poland remained under Soviet military control. Approximately 60,000 soldiers of the Home Army had been arrested by the NKVD. Some 50,000 of them were deported to the gulags and prisons deep in the Soviet Union. After several months of brutal interrogation and torture, 16 leaders of the Polish Underground State were sent to jails in the USSR after a staged trial on trumped-up charges in Moscow. The Soviet Army Northern Group of Forces was stationed in the country until 1956. The persecution of the anti-Nazi resistance members was only a part of the reign of Stalinist terror in Poland. In the period of 1944–56, approximately 300,000 Polish people had been arrested, or up to two million, according to differing accounts. There were 6,000 political death sentences issued, the majority of them carried out. It is estimated that over 20,000 people died in communist prisons including those executed "in the majesty of the law" such as Witold Pilecki or Emil August Fieldorf.

== Estimated casualties of World War II and its aftermath ==
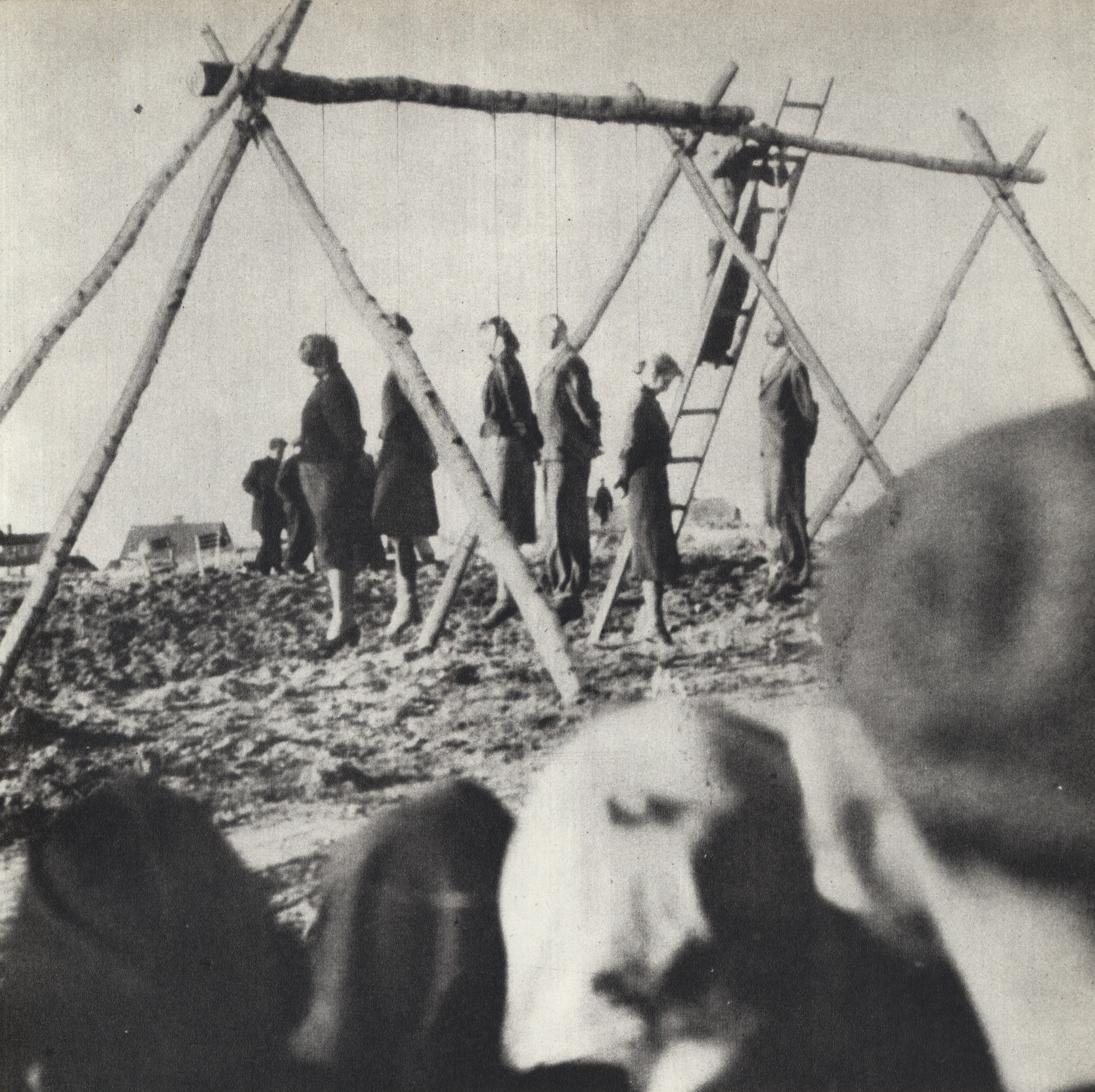
Public execution of Polish civilians in German-occupied territory, 1942

Around six million Polish citizens died between 1939 and 1945; an estimated 4,900,000 to 5,700,000 were murdered by German forces and 150,000 to one million by Soviet forces.

In August 2009 the Polish Institute of National Remembrance (IPN) researchers estimated Poland's dead (including Polish Jews) at between 5.47 and 5.67 million (due to German actions) and 150,000 (due to Soviet), or around 5.62 and 5.82 million total.

During World War II, Jews in Poland suffered the worst percentage loss of life compared to all other national and ethnic groups. The vast majority were civilians. On average, 2800 Polish citizens died per day during its occupation. Poland's professional classes suffered higher than average casualties with doctors (45%), lawyers (57%), university professors (40%), technicians (30%), clergy (18%) and many journalists.

It was not only Polish citizens who died at the hands of the occupying powers but many others. Tadeusz Piotrowski estimates that two million people belonging to fifty different nationalities from 29 countries were exterminated by the Germans in occupied Poland. This includes one million foreign Jews transported from across Europe to die in the Nazi extermination camps on Polish soil, along with 784,000 Soviet POWs and 22,000 Italian POWs.

== See also ==
- Anti-Polish sentiment
- Chronicles of Terror
- Communist crimes (Polish legal concept)
- Consequences of Nazism
- Eastern Catholic victims of Soviet persecutions
- Generalplan Ost
- Historiography of the Volyn tragedy
- Hunger Plan
- List of Polish war cemeteries
- List of war crimes
- Military occupations by the Soviet Union
- Nazi crimes against the Polish nation
- Nuremberg trials
- Occupation of Poland (1939–1945)
- The Black Book of Communism
- World War II evacuation and expulsion

== Notes ==
The German Army opening of the September Campaign against unarmed civilians in Poland:
a. Datner, Gumkowski & Leszczyński (1962, p. 127)
b. Datner, Gumkowski & Leszczyński (1962, p. 138)
c. Gilbert (1990, p. 85)
d. Gilbert (1990, p. 87)

Virtual Shtetl, Plaque at Olsztynska Street commemorating Bloody Monday in Częstochowa [Tablica przy ul. Olsztyńskiej upamiętniająca ofiary 'krwawego poniedziałku'], Museum of the History of Polish Jews, pp. 1–2 of 5, "Executions took place in front of, and in the courtyard of the townhall; behind the offices of the Wydział Techniczny Zarządu Miejskiego; at the New Market Square (currently Daszyński Square); inside the Church of św. Zygmunta; at Strażacka street in front of the Brass' Works; and at the Cathedral Square as well as inside the Cathedral."

e. Datner (1967, p. 187)
f. Böhler (2009, pp. 106–116)
g. Datner (1967, p. 239)
h. Gilbert (1990, p. 86)
i. Gilbert (1990, p. 87)
j. Datner (1967, p. 315)
k. Datner (1967, p. 333)
l. Datner (1967, p. 355)
m. Datner (1967, p. 352)
n. Gilbert (1990, p. 88)

THHP (2014). "Crimes Against Unarmed Civilians". Crimes Committed by the Wehrmacht. The Holocaust History Project. Archived from the original on 4 February 2019. & Virtual Shtetl (2014). "15 September 1939: Przemyśl, Medyka". Museum of the History of Polish Jews.

o. Markiewicz (2003–2004, pp. 65–68)
p. Gilbert (1990, p. 87)
r. Datner (1967, p. 388)
s. Datner, Gumkowski & Leszczyński (1962, p. 131)
t. Datner (1967, p. 313)
u. Datner (1967, p. 330)
w. Datner (1967, p. 392)
