= Malcher =

Malcher is a surname. Notable people with the surname include:

- Adam Malcher (born 1986), Polish handball player
- George Malcher (1914–2001), Polish historian, writer, and political analyst
- Günter Malcher (born 1934), German athlete

== See also ==
- Walcher (disambiguation)
