= Ślepowron =

Ślepowron ("night heron") may refer to:

- Ślepowron coat of arms
- Ślepowron, Masovian Voivodeship (east-central Poland)
