= Wawrzyszów =

Wawrzyszów may refer to the following places in Poland:

- Wawrzyszów, Lower Silesian Voivodeship (south-west Poland)
- Wawrzyszów, Masovian Voivodeship (east-central Poland)
