= Jarosławice, Masovian Voivodeship =

Jarosławice
- Village
- Location within Poland
- Coordinates: 51°26′N 20°56′E
- Country: Poland
- Voivodeship: Masovian
- County: Radom
- Gmina: Wolanów

Jarosławice [jarɔswaˈvit͡sɛ] is a village in the administrative district of Gmina Wolanów, within Radom County, Masovian Voivodeship, in east-central Poland.
