= Kowalanka =

- Village
- Location within Poland
- Coordinates: 51°23′6″N 20°59′16″E
- Country: Poland
- Voivodeship: Masovian
- County: Radom
- Gmina: Wolanów

Kowalanka [kɔvaˈlanka] is a village in the administrative district of Gmina Wolanów, within Radom County, Masovian Voivodeship, in east-central Poland.
