= Podlesie, Radom County =

Podlesie
- Village
- Location within Poland
- Coordinates: 51°22′10″N 21°01′47″E
- Country: Poland
- Voivodeship: Masovian
- County: Radom
- Gmina: Wolanów

Podlesie [pɔdˈlɛɕɛ] is a village in the administrative district of Gmina Wolanów, within Radom County, Masovian Voivodeship, in east-central Poland.
