= Sławno, Masovian Voivodeship =

Sławno
- Village
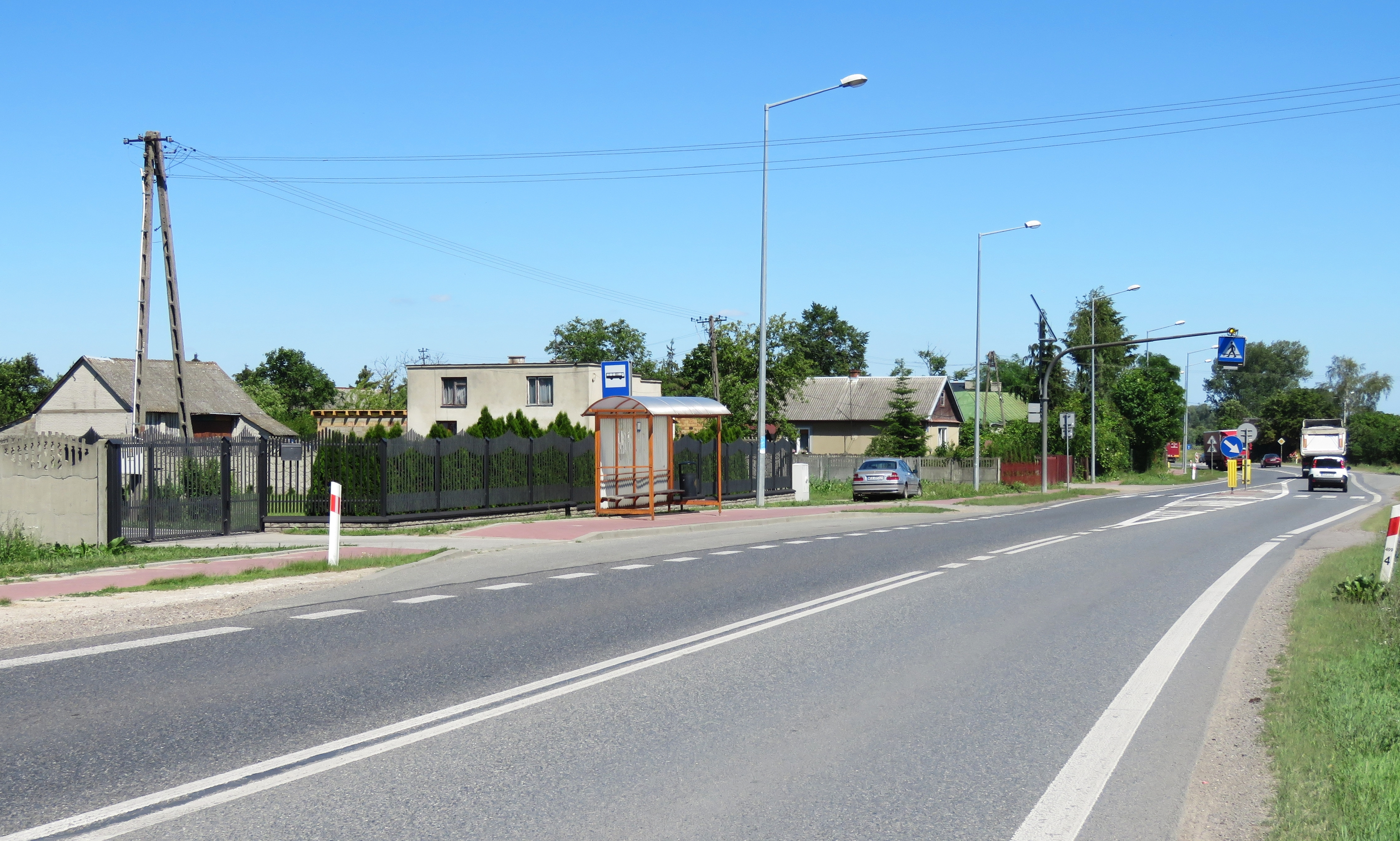

- Location within Poland
- Coordinates: 51°23′21″N 21°01′14″E
- Country: Poland
- Voivodeship: Masovian
- County: Radom
- Gmina: Wolanów

Sławno [ˈswavnɔ] is a village in the administrative district of Gmina Wolanów, within Radom County, Masovian Voivodeship, in east-central Poland.
