= Wymysłów, Gmina Wolanów =

Wymysłów
- Village
- Location within Poland
- Coordinates: 51°21′12″N 20°52′45″E
- Country: Poland
- Voivodeship: Masovian
- County: Radom
- Gmina: Wolanów

Wymysłów [vɨˈmɨswuf] is a village in the administrative district of Gmina Wolanów, within Radom County, Masovian Voivodeship, in east-central Poland.
