= Kolonia Wolanów =

- Village
- Location within Poland
- Coordinates: 51°23′11″N 20°57′43″E
- Country: Poland
- Voivodeship: Masovian
- County: Radom
- Gmina: Wolanów
- Population: 129

Kolonia Wolanów [kɔˈlɔɲa vɔˈlanuf] is a village in the administrative district of Gmina Wolanów, within Radom County, Masovian Voivodeship, in east-central Poland.
