= Strzałków, Masovian Voivodeship =

Strzałków
- Village
- Location within Poland
- Coordinates: 51°23′N 20°57′E
- Country: Poland
- Voivodeship: Masovian
- County: Radom
- Gmina: Wolanów

Strzałków [ˈstʂau̯kuf] is a village in the administrative district of Gmina Wolanów, within Radom County, Masovian Voivodeship, in east-central Poland.
