= Mniszek, Masovian Voivodeship =

Mniszek
- Village
- Location within Poland
- Coordinates: 51°22′N 20°52′E
- Country: Poland
- Voivodeship: Masovian
- County: Radom
- Gmina: Wolanów
- Population: 500

Mniszek [ˈmniʂɛk] is a village in the administrative district of Gmina Wolanów, within Radom County, Masovian Voivodeship, in east-central Poland.
