= Wolanów, Masovian Voivodeship =

Wolanów
- Village
- Location within Poland
- Coordinates: 51°22′47″N 20°58′39″E
- Country: Poland
- Voivodeship: Masovian
- County: Radom
- Gmina: Wolanów

Wolanów [vɔˈlanuf] is a village in Radom County, Masovian Voivodeship, in east-central Poland. It is the seat of the gmina (administrative district) called Gmina Wolanów.
