= Wacławów, Radom County =

Wacławów
- Village
- Location within Poland
- Coordinates: 51°25′N 21°0′E
- Country: Poland
- Voivodeship: Masovian
- County: Radom
- Gmina: Wolanów

Wacławów [vat͡sˈwavuf] is a village in the administrative district of Gmina Wolanów, within Radom County, Masovian Voivodeship, in east-central Poland.
