= Franciszków, Radom County =

Franciszków
- Village
- Location within Poland
- Coordinates: 51°22′19″N 21°0′38″E
- Country: Poland
- Voivodeship: Masovian
- County: Radom
- Gmina: Wolanów

Franciszków (Polish pronunciation: [fraɲˈt͡ɕiʂkuf]) is a village in the administrative district of Gmina Wolanów, within Radom County, Masovian Voivodeship, in east-central Poland.
