= Bieniędzice =

- Village
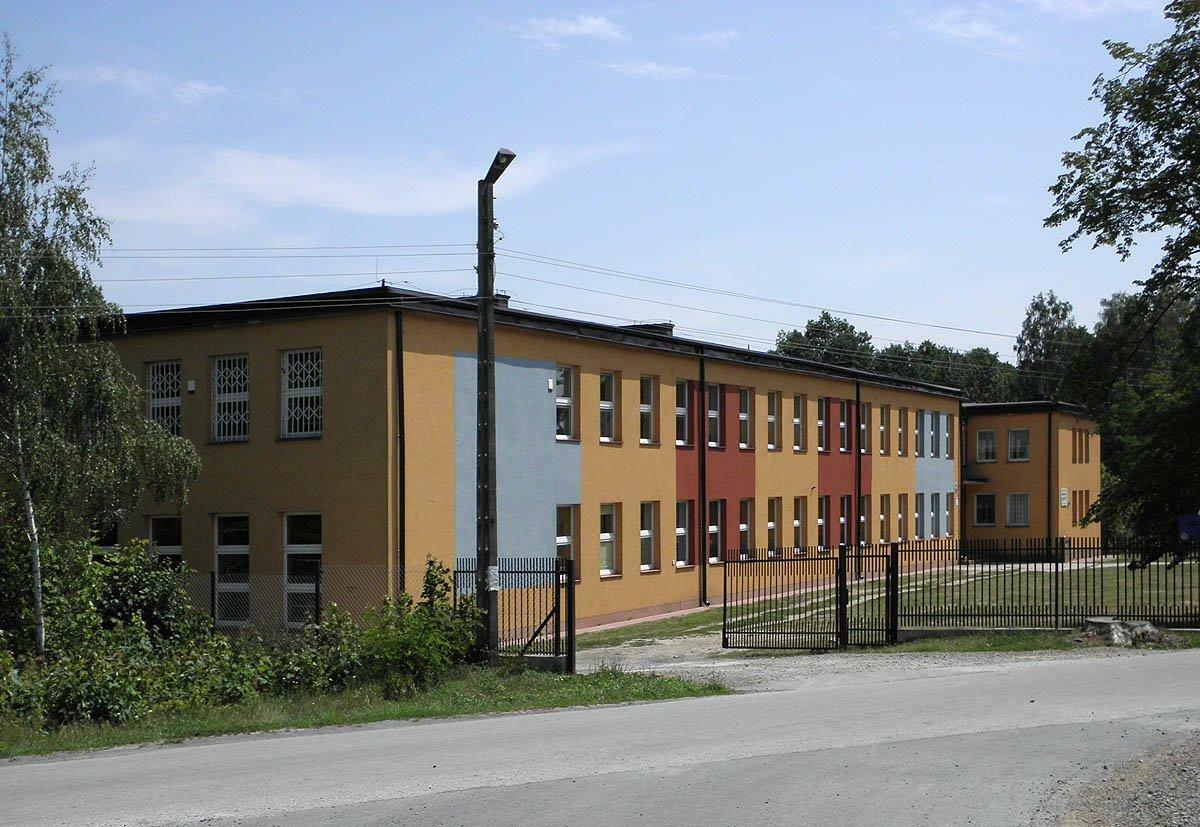

- Location within Poland
- Coordinates: 51°24′31″N 20°55′41″E
- Country: Poland
- Voivodeship: Masovian
- County: Radom
- Gmina: Wolanów

Bieniędzice [bjɛɲɛnˈd͡ʑit͡sɛ] is a village in the administrative district of Gmina Wolanów, within Radom County, Masovian Voivodeship, in east-central Poland.
