= Kowala-Duszocina =

- Village
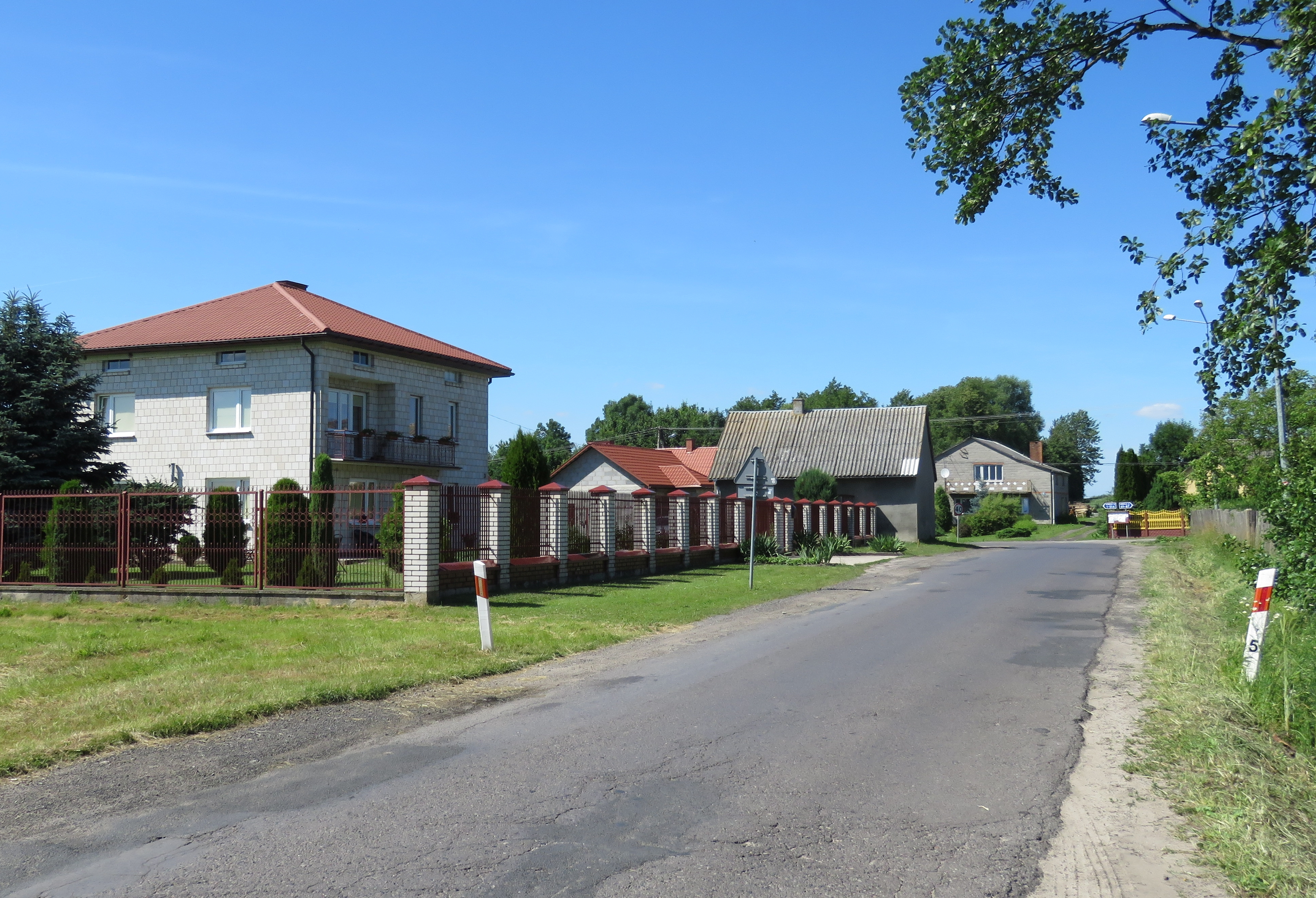
- Wayside houses in Kowala-Duszocina

- Location within Poland
- Coordinates: 51°23′39″N 20°58′16″E
- Country: Poland
- Voivodeship: Masovian
- County: Radom
- Gmina: Wolanów

Kowala-Duszocina [kɔˈvala duʂɔˈt͡ɕina] is a village in the administrative district of Gmina Wolanów, within Radom County, Masovian Voivodeship, in east-central Poland.
