= Młodocin Większy =

- Village
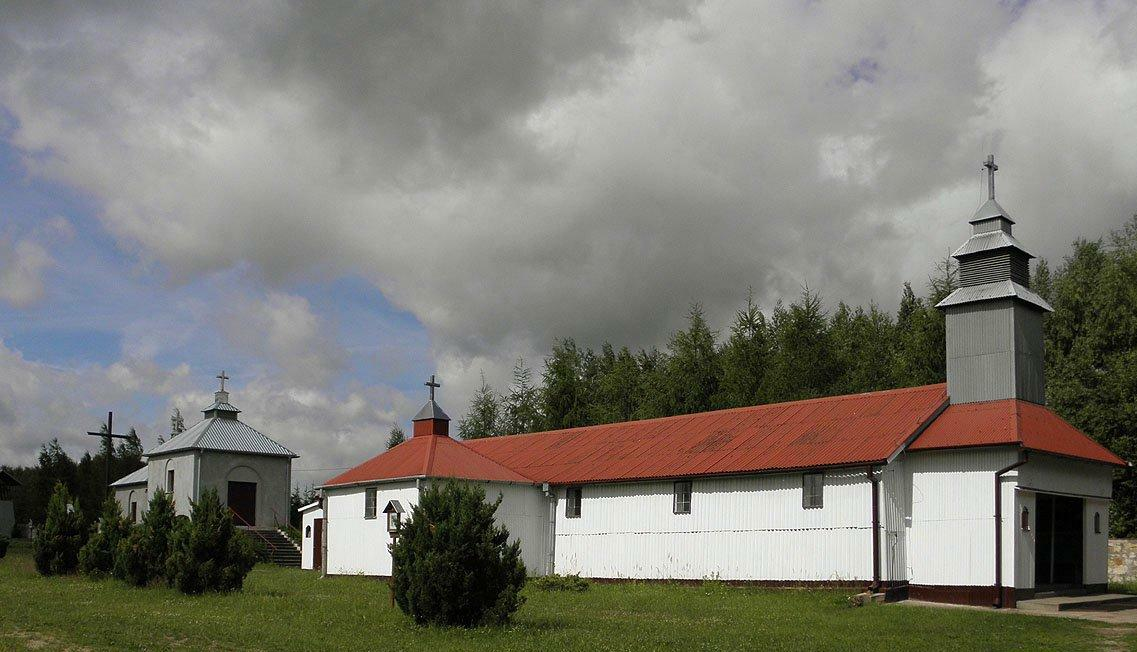

- Location within Poland
- Coordinates: 51°21′16″N 21°01′11″E
- Country: Poland
- Voivodeship: Masovian
- County: Radom
- Gmina: Wolanów

Młodocin Większy [mwɔˈdɔt͡ɕin ˈvjɛŋkʂɨ] is a village in the administrative district of Gmina Wolanów, within Radom County, Masovian Voivodeship, in east-central Poland.
