= Gmina Wolanów =

Gmina Wolanów Wolanów Commune
- Gmina
- Coat of arms
- Interactive map of Gmina Wolanów
- Coordinates (Wolanów): 51°22′47″N 20°58′39″E
- Country: Poland
- Voivodeship: Masovian
- County: Radom County
- Seat: Wolanów

Area
  - Total: 82.85 km^{2} (31.99 sq mi)

Population (2006)
  - Total: 8,291
  - Density: 100.1/km^{2} (259.2/sq mi)
- Website: http://www.wolanow.pl/

Gmina Wolanów is a rural gmina (administrative district) in Radom County, Masovian Voivodeship, in east-central Poland. Its seat is the village of Wolanów, which lies approximately 12 kilometres (7 mi) south-west of Radom and 95 km (59 mi) south of Warsaw.

The gmina covers an area of 82.85 square kilometres (32.0 sq mi), and as of 2006 its total population is 8,291.

== Villages ==
Gmina Wolanów contains the villages and settlements of Bieniędzice, Chruślice, Franciszków, Garno, Jarosławice, Kacprowice, Kolonia Wolanów, Kowala-Duszocina, Kowalanka, Młodocin Większy, Mniszek, Podlesie, Rogowa, Sławno, Ślepowron, Strzałków, Wacławów, Waliny, Wawrzyszów, Wolanów, Wymysłów and Zabłocie.

== Neighbouring gminas ==
Gmina Wolanów is bordered by the city of Radom and by the gminas of Jastrząb, Kowala, Orońsko, Przytyk, Wieniawa and Zakrzew.
