= Chruślice, Masovian Voivodeship =

Chruślice
- Village
- Location within Poland
- Coordinates: 51°25′N 20°59′E
- Country: Poland
- Voivodeship: Masovian
- County: Radom
- Gmina: Wolanów

Chruślice [xruˈɕlit͡sɛ] is a village in the administrative district of Gmina Wolanów, within Radom County, Masovian Voivodeship, in east-central Poland.
