= Zabłocie, Radom County =

Zabłocie
- Village
- Location within Poland
- Coordinates: 51°24′N 20°57′E
- Country: Poland
- Voivodeship: Masovian
- County: Radom
- Gmina: Wolanów

Zabłocie [zaˈbwɔt͡ɕɛ] is a village in the administrative district of Gmina Wolanów, within Radom County, Masovian Voivodeship, in east-central Poland.
