= Walcher (disambiguation) =

Walcher (died 1080) was bishop of Durham and earl of Northumbria.

Walcher may also refer to:

== Surname ==
- Achim Walcher (born 1967), Austrian cross-country skier
- Jacob Walcher (1887–1970), German politician
- Josef Walcher (1954–1984), Austrian alpine ski racer
- Joseph Walcher (1719–1803), Austrian Jesuit professor of mechanics
- Kathleen Walcher (fl. 2003–2006), American politician
- Rocky Walcher (born 1961), American golfer

== Given name ==
- Walcher of Malvern (died 1135), prior of Great Malvern

== See also ==
- Walcheren
