= Kacprowice =

- Village
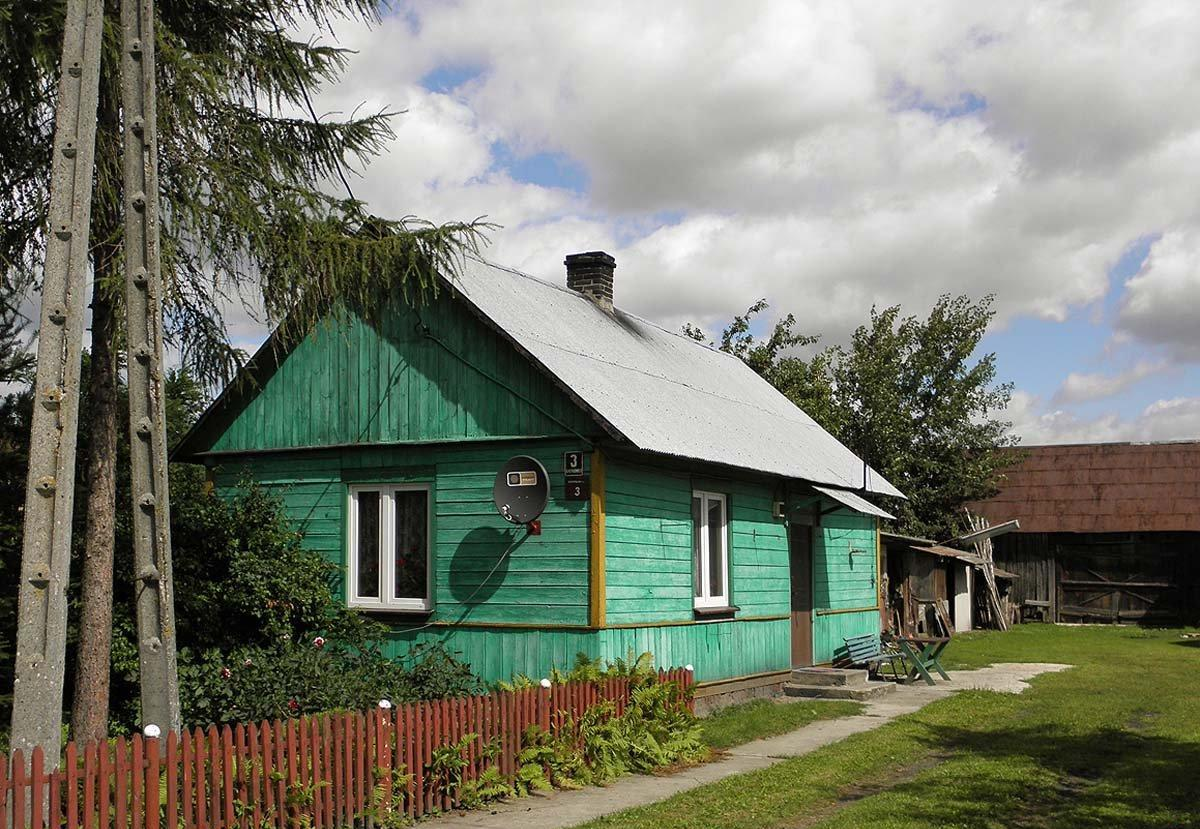
- House in Kacprowice

- Location within Poland
- Coordinates: 51°23′06″N 20°59′39″E
- Country: Poland
- Voivodeship: Masovian
- County: Radom
- Gmina: Wolanów

Kacprowice [kat͡sprɔˈvit͡sɛ] is a village in the administrative district of Gmina Wolanów, within Radom County, Masovian Voivodeship, in located in east-central Poland.
