= Wawrzyszów, Masovian Voivodeship =

Wawrzyszów
- Village
- Location within Poland
- Coordinates: 51°23′N 20°55′E
- Country: Poland
- Voivodeship: Masovian
- County: Radom
- Gmina: Wolanów
- Population (approx.): 300

Wawrzyszów [vaˈvʐɨʂuf] is a village in the administrative district of Gmina Wolanów, within Radom County, Masovian Voivodeship, in east-central Poland.
