= George Malcher =

Blank Pages by George C. Malcher
- Born: 11 July 1914; Rybnik, Poland
- Died: 21 May 2001 (aged 86); Hampshire, United Kingdom
- Education: Jagiellonian University
- Occupations: Political analyst, linguist, historian
- Known for: World War II historiography Genocide research

George Charles Malcher MBE also known as G.C. Malcher or Jerzy Karol Malcher (11 July 1914 – 21 May 2001) was a writer, historian, and political analyst educated in the field of law at the Jagiellonian University of Kraków in the Interwar Poland. He is the author of two nominal books about the history of Poland and Polish-Soviet relations under Communist dictatorship: Poland's Politicized Army (1984), and Blank Pages, Soviet Genocide Against the Polish People (1993).

During the Nazi German September campaign of 1939, Malcher escaped from a POW field hospital and in 1940 joined the Polish Armed Forces in the West led by General Sikorski. He served under British Command in Great Britain, North Africa and Italy mainly in intelligence services. Following World War II he did not return to new Soviet-controlled Poland and subsequently worked for over 30 years as a high-grade linguist in the British Civil Service in Hampshire where he lived. In 1958 George Malcher was awarded Membership of the Order of the British Empire in recognition of his service with the U.K. Ministry of Defence.

== Life and work ==
Malcher was born at the onset of World War I in Upper Silesia. He studied law and administration in the already sovereign Poland at the Jagiellonian University, and political systems at the School of Political Sciences in Kraków. He arrived in Great Britain after the Dunkirk evacuation of British and French forces during that battle. Decades after World War II, during the birth of Solidarity in Poland which coincided with his retirement, Malcher was again involved in the political struggle for Poland's return to freedom. He died in Hampshire, United Kingdom, aged 86 years, survived by Jadwiga, his wife of 54 years and their three children.

George Malcher is the author of two books related to history of wartorn Poland; his Poland's Politicized Army subtitled Communists in uniform was published in 1984 by Praeger, New York, U.S.A. and Blank Pages, Soviet Genocide Against the Polish People was published in the UK in 1993 by Pyrford Press.
