= Katyn list =

Katyn list may refer to:

- Lists of Polish citizens killed at particular locations of the Katyn massacre
- Ukrainian Katyn List, the list of people killed during the Katyn massacre in the territory of Ukraine
- Belarusian Katyn List, the list of people killed during the Katyn massacre in the territory of Belarus
- Lista Katyńska. Jeńcy obozów Kozielsk, Ostaszków, Starobielsk. Zaginieni w Rosji Sowieckiej, a 1949 book by Adam Moszyński
