= Katyn Polish War Cemetery =

Polish military cemetery in Smolensk Oblast, Russia

Coordinates: 54°46′24″N 31°47′19″E

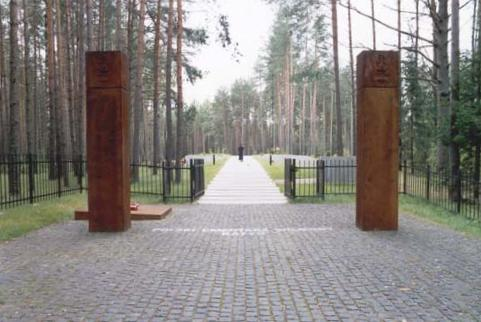
- Central entrance
- Interactive map of Katyn Polish War Cemetery

Details
- Established: 1998
- Location: Katyn, Russia
- Country: Russia

Katyn war cemetery (Russian: Мемориальный комплекс «Катынь», Polish: Polski Cmentarz Wojenny w Katyniu) is a Polish military cemetery located in Katyn, a small village 22 kilometres away from Smolensk, Russia, on the road to Vitebsk. It contains the remnants of 4,412 Polish officers of the Kozelsk prisoner of war camp, who were murdered in 1940 in what is called the Katyn massacre. Except for bodies of two Polish generals exhumed by German authorities in 1943 and then buried separately, all Polish officers murdered in Katyn were buried in eight large mass graves. There is also a Russian part of the cemetery, where some 6,500 victims of the Soviet Great Purges of the 1930s were buried by the NKVD. The cemetery was officially opened in 2000.

The cemetery is a large, irregular area covering roughly 22 hectares of forest. All mass graves are located on both sides of the main alley. There is also a circular alley with thousands of names of the officers who perished in the massacre. At the end of the main alley there is a war memorial and an altar with a memorial bell located underground.

== History ==
Initially, after the exhumation of 1943, the Germans had permitted the Polish Red Cross to build a cemetery on the spot. However, following the Soviet re-taking of the area it was destroyed and most evidence removed. The area was again forested and civilians were banned from entering the area. As the knowledge of the massacre was suppressed in Communist countries, in 1976 the Polish Government in Exile awarded the Katyn Memorial in London with the cross of Virtuti Militari, the highest Polish military award.

Following Soviet admittance of the crime in 1990, the exhumation and archaeological works were resumed. In 1994 a bi-lateral treaty on war cemeteries and war memorials was concluded between Poland and Russia. This paved the way for a construction of a proper war cemetery in Katyn. After several years of construction it was opened to the public on July 28, 2000. That year also similar cemeteries were opened at other mass murder sites of Piatikhatki (near Kharkiv), Smolensk, and Mednoye. The Virtuti Militari awarded to the monument in London was then transferred to Katyn, which became one of the very few places in the world among its recipients.

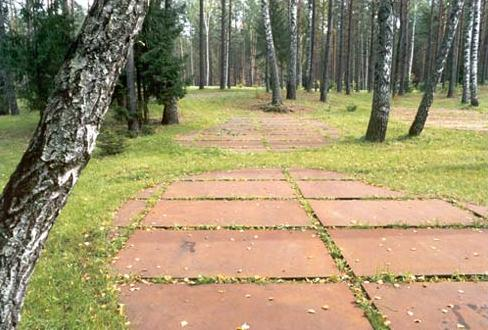
Mass burial sites are now marked with iron slabs

During the opening ceremony the spot was visited by the highest Polish and Russian authorities. Among them were the Prime Ministers Jerzy Buzek and Viktor Khristenko, as well as Marshals of Sejm (Maciej Płażyński) and Senate (Alicja Grześkowiak). The ceremony was opened by the Polish Chief of General Staff, General Henryk Szumski, and concluded with a Catholic mass celebrated by the primate of Poland Józef Glemp, while the Orthodox ceremony was conducted by Metropolitan bishop of Smolensk Cyril Gundyaev. There were also prayers of other denominations held, as there were also Protestant, Muslim and Jewish victims of the NKVD buried there.

On April 10, 2010, the Polish President Lech Kaczyński, his wife and another 94 people including many of his top staff members, more than a dozen members of the Parliament and leaders of the military died when the presidential plane went down about a half mile from the runway in the Russian city of Smolensk. The Polish delegation was on its way to take part in a ceremony there to commemorate the Soviet massacre of more than 20,000 members of Poland's elite 70 years before.

== Gallery ==
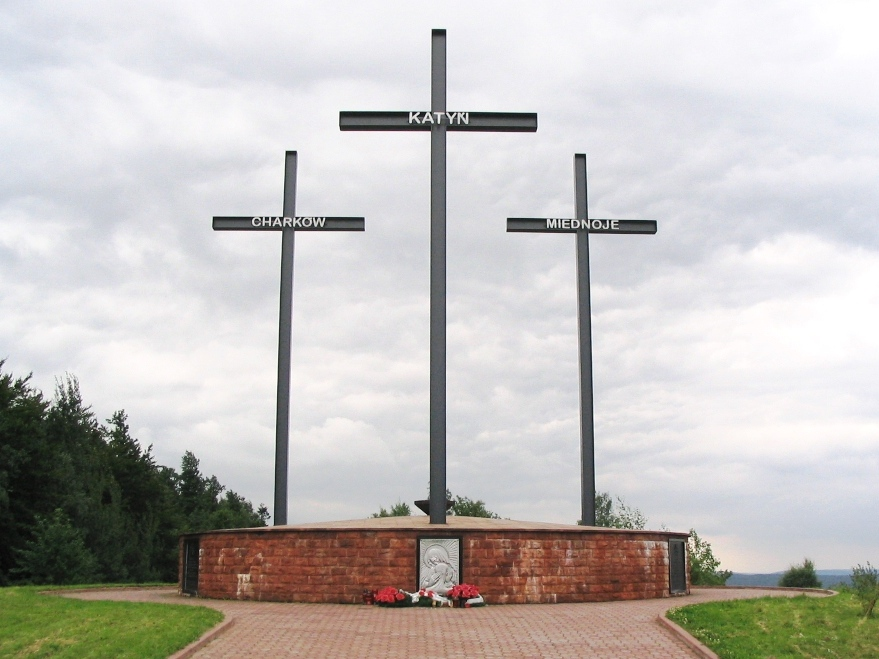
Memorial "Three Crosses (Kharkov, Katyn, Mednoye)", Kielce, Poland

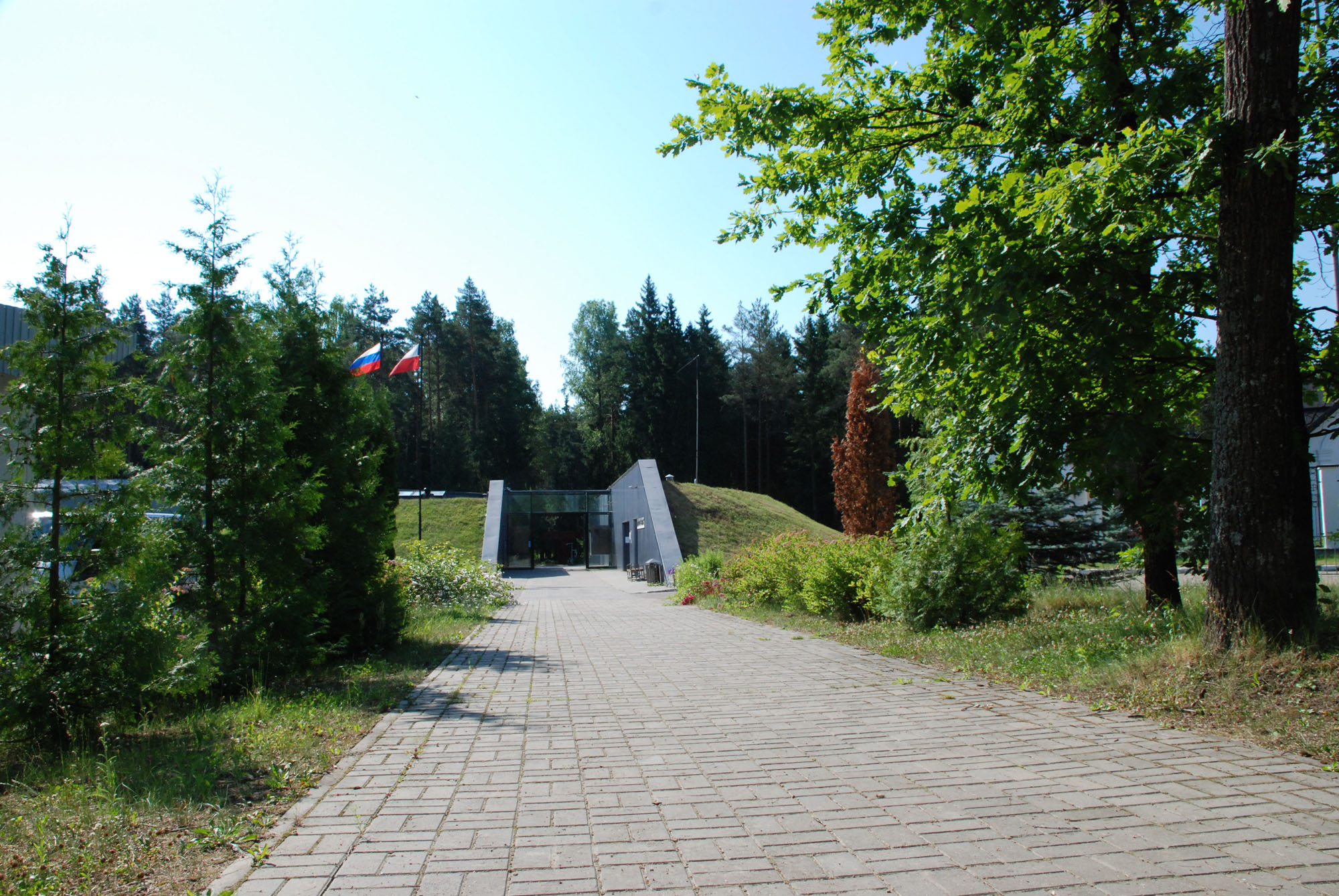
The alley leading from the Smolensk–Vitebsk highway to the main entrance to the Memorial Complex

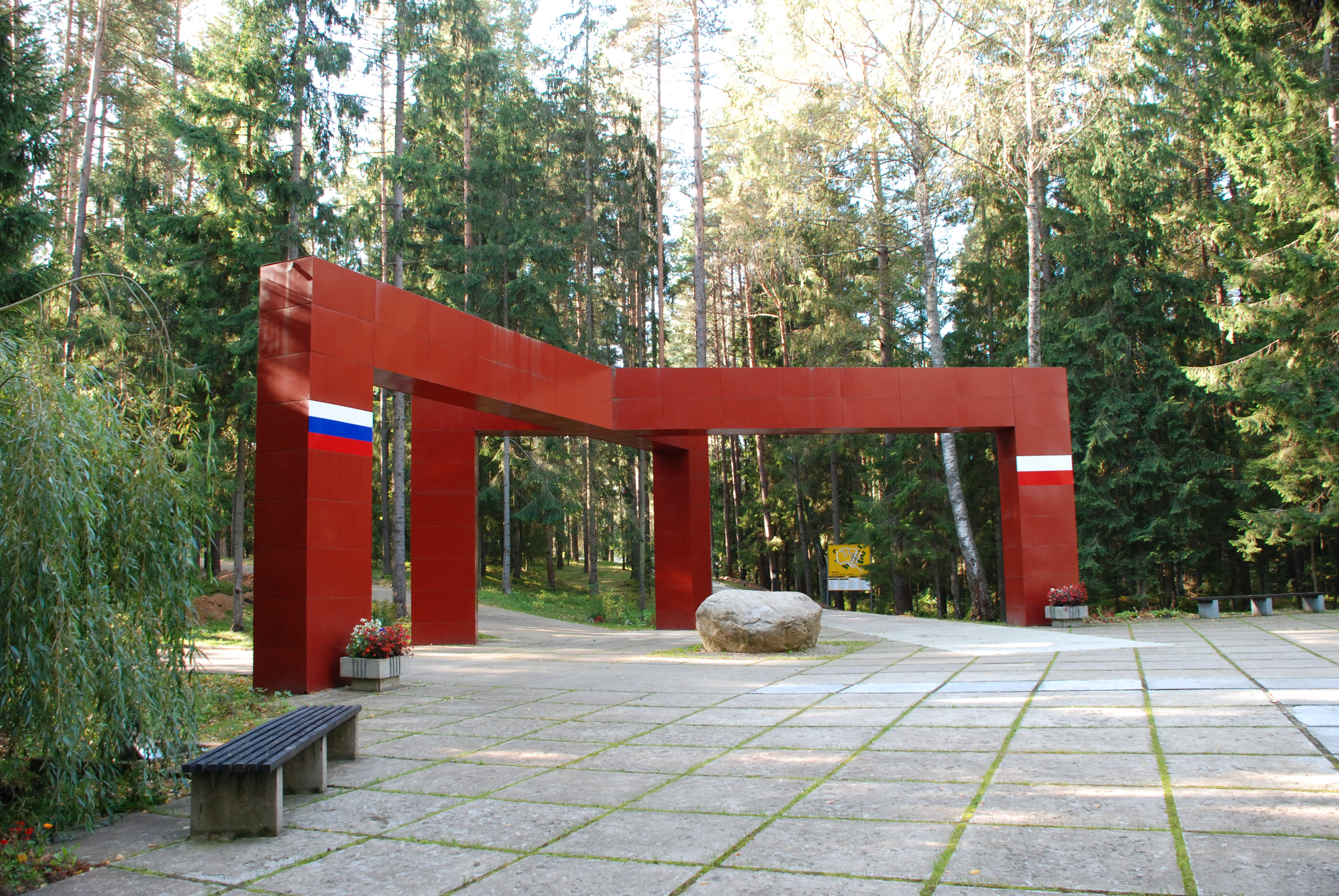
The ritual site of the Katyn Memorial and the portals of the entrance to the alleys of the Polish and Russian cemeteries

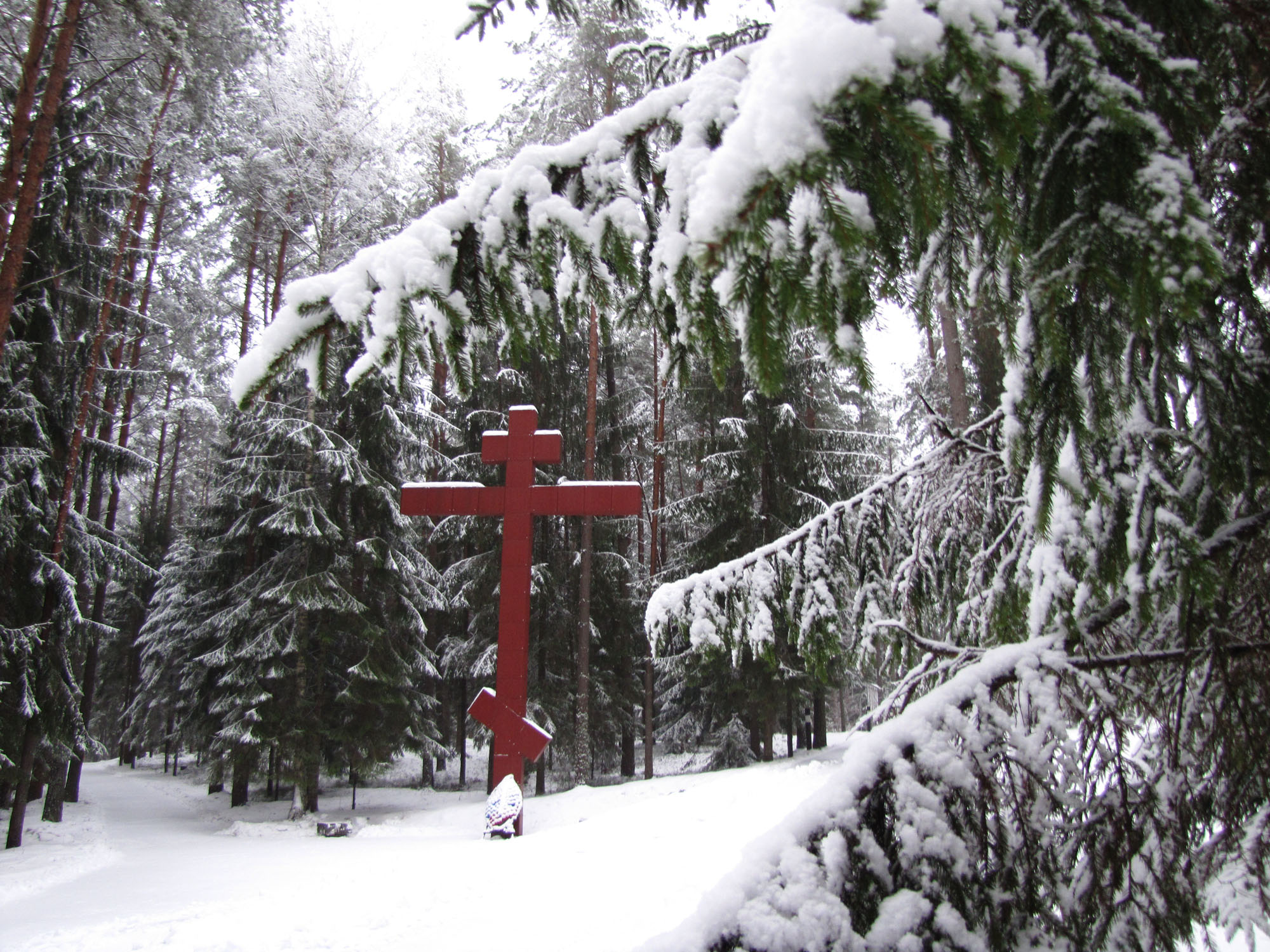
The Orthodox cross on the Russian part of the Memorial

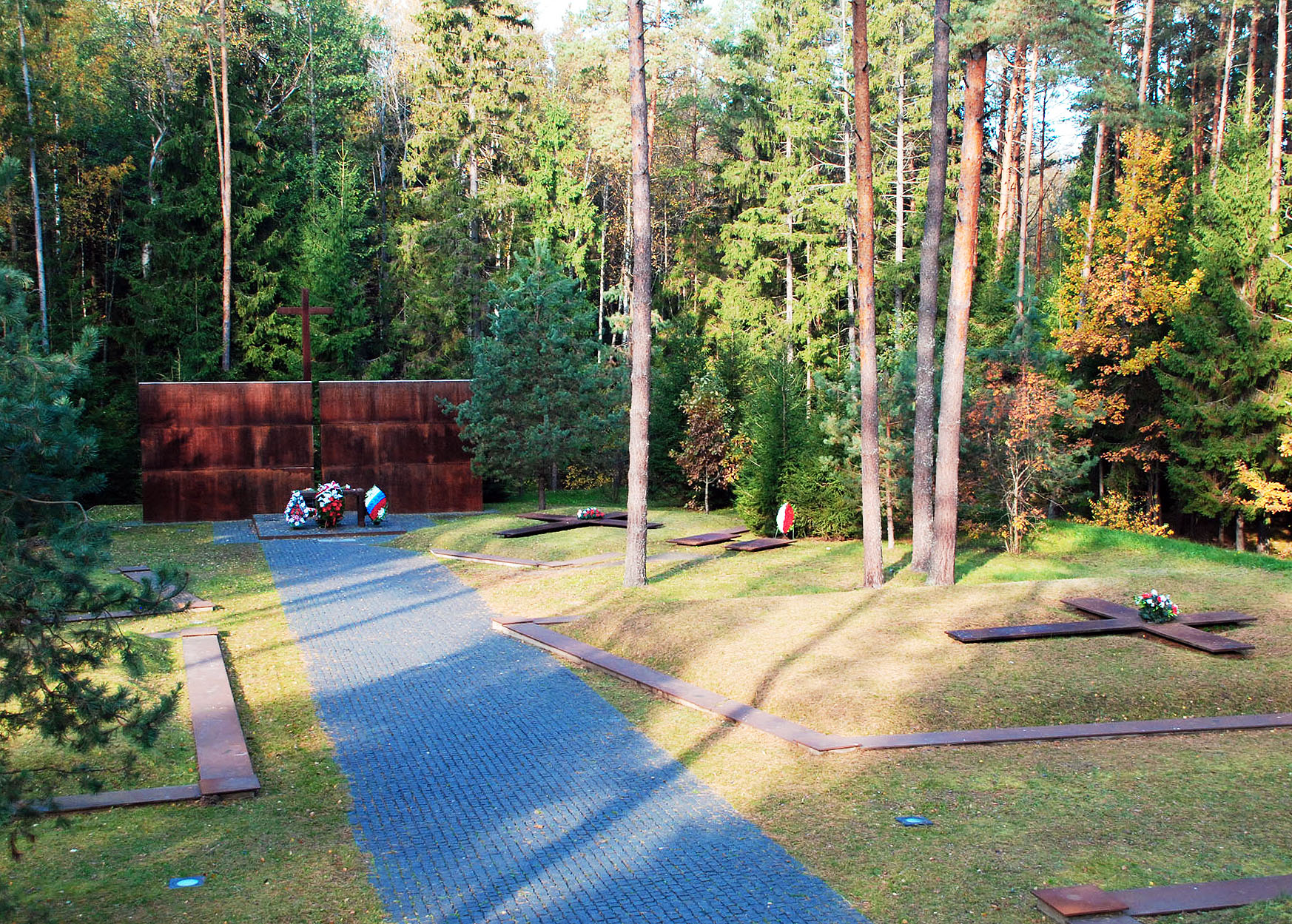
Polish Military cemetery (general view)

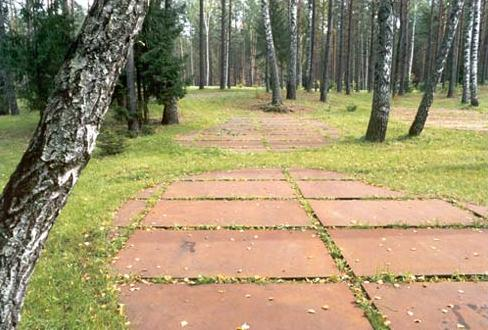
Symbolic contours of the mass graves of Polish officers

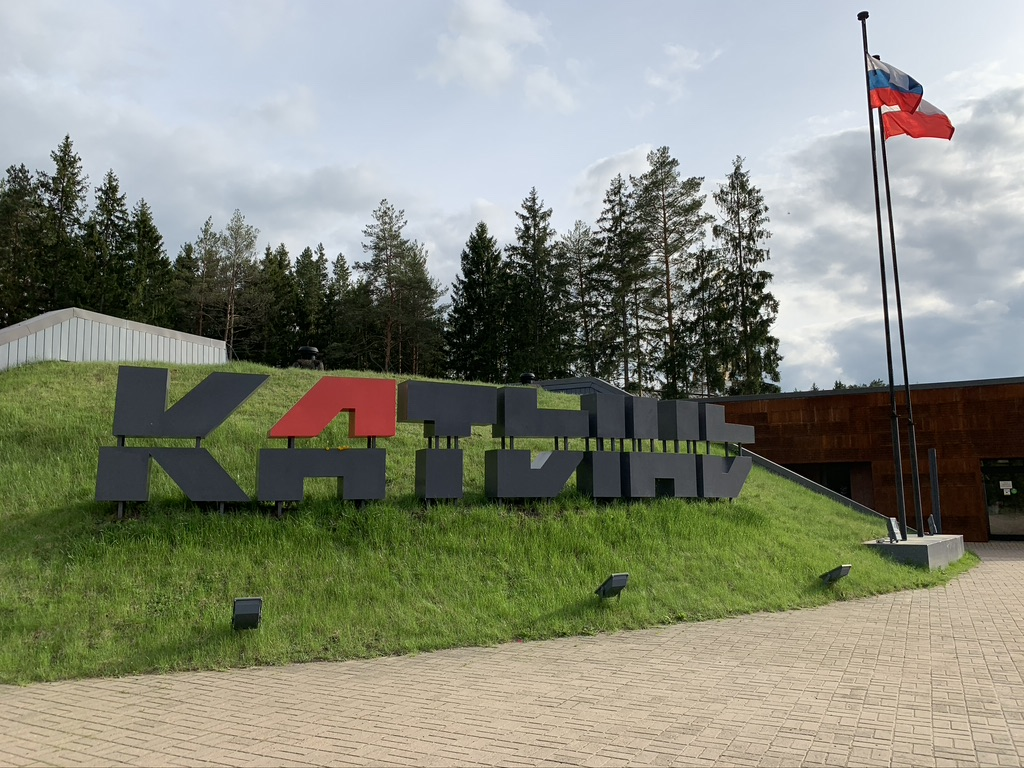
Entrance to the Katyn Memorial complex in the Smolensk Oblast

== Other cemeteries ==
- Mednoye, Tver Oblast (Russia)
- Piatykhatky, Kharkiv Oblast (Ukraine)
- Bykivnia (Ukraine)
- No data about Belarus cemeteries, possibly Kurapaty
