= Piotr Soprunenko =

Soviet Major-General

- Born: 17 March 1908; Kyiv, Russian Empire
- Died: 23 June 1992 (aged 84) Moscow, Russia
- Branch: Red Army
- Rank: Major-General
- Known for: Perpetrator of Katyn Massacre

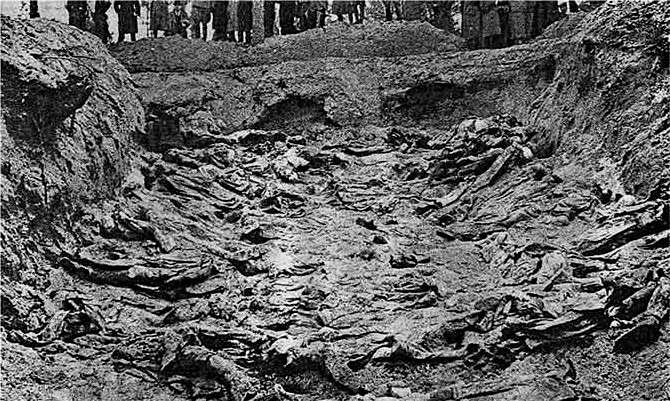
A mass grave at Katyn, 1943

Piotr Karpovich Soprunenko (Петро Карпович Сопруненко)(17 March 1908 – 23 June 1992) was a Soviet Major-General in the Red Army who carried out the Katyn Massacre in World War II. Soprunenko had 22,000 prisoners of war under his jurisdiction as head of a branch of the Soviet NKVD called the "Department for POW Affairs" that was created by Lavrenty Beria. He was of Ukrainian ancestry.

== Biography ==
Sporunenko was born near Kyiv in Ukraine, under the Russian Empire.

Soprunenko achieved the rank of captain of State Security in March 1940, major in 1942, colonel and then commissar in 1943, and Major General in 1945.

== War crimes ==
Soprunenko was reportedly responsible for the executions of nearly 22,000 Polish intelligentsia, military officers, and other prisoners of war during the Katyn Massacre in April and May 1940. This is considered by many to be a genocide.

In 1990, Nicholas Bethell, 4th Baron Bethell raised a question with the UK Government regarding Soprunenko's role in Katyn with a view to his possible prosecution as a war criminal.

In 1991, the Soviet Union declined to prosecute Soprunenko due to infirmity and old age, and he never faced justice.
