= Ukrainian Katyn List =

List of Poles murdered by the NKVD in Ukraine

The Ukrainian Katyn List (Ukraińska Lista Katyńska) also known as the Tsvetukhin List (Lista Cwietuchina) is the list of Polish citizens murdered by the NKVD in Ukraine on the basis of the decision of the Politburo of the All-Union Communist Party (Bolsheviks) and the USSR state authorities of March 5, 1940, the victims of the Katyn massacre.

On May 5, 1994, the list with personal data of 3,435 Polish citizens together with their prison personal files was passed by Ukraine to Poland.

== See also ==
- Belarusian Katyn List
