= Piatykhatky, Kharkiv Oblast =

Neighborhood of Kharkiv, Ukraine

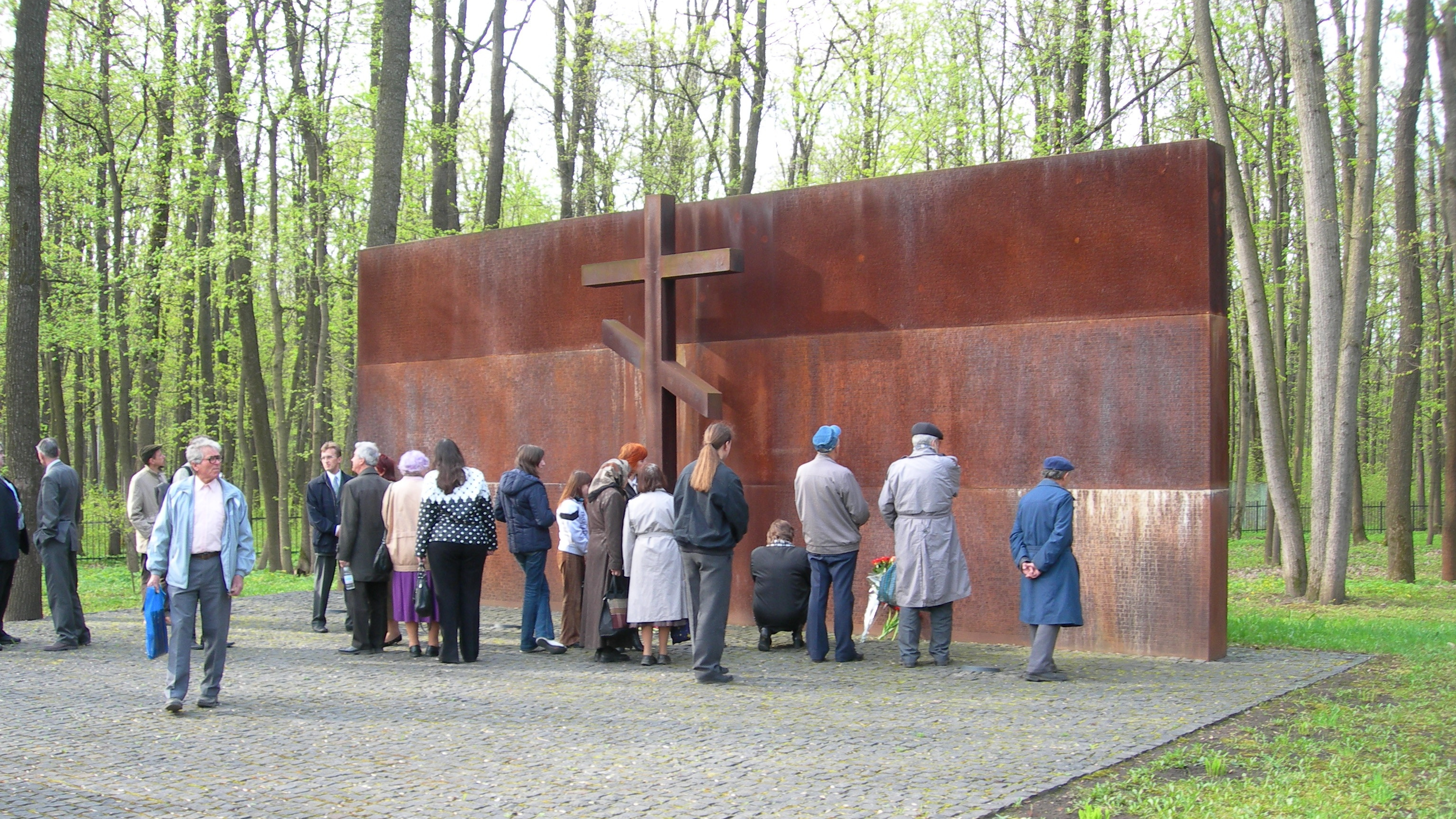
Monument to the thousands of Ukrainian Intelligents were executed by the National Committee of Internal Affairs ( Abbreviation in Russian: NKVD) in 1937-38

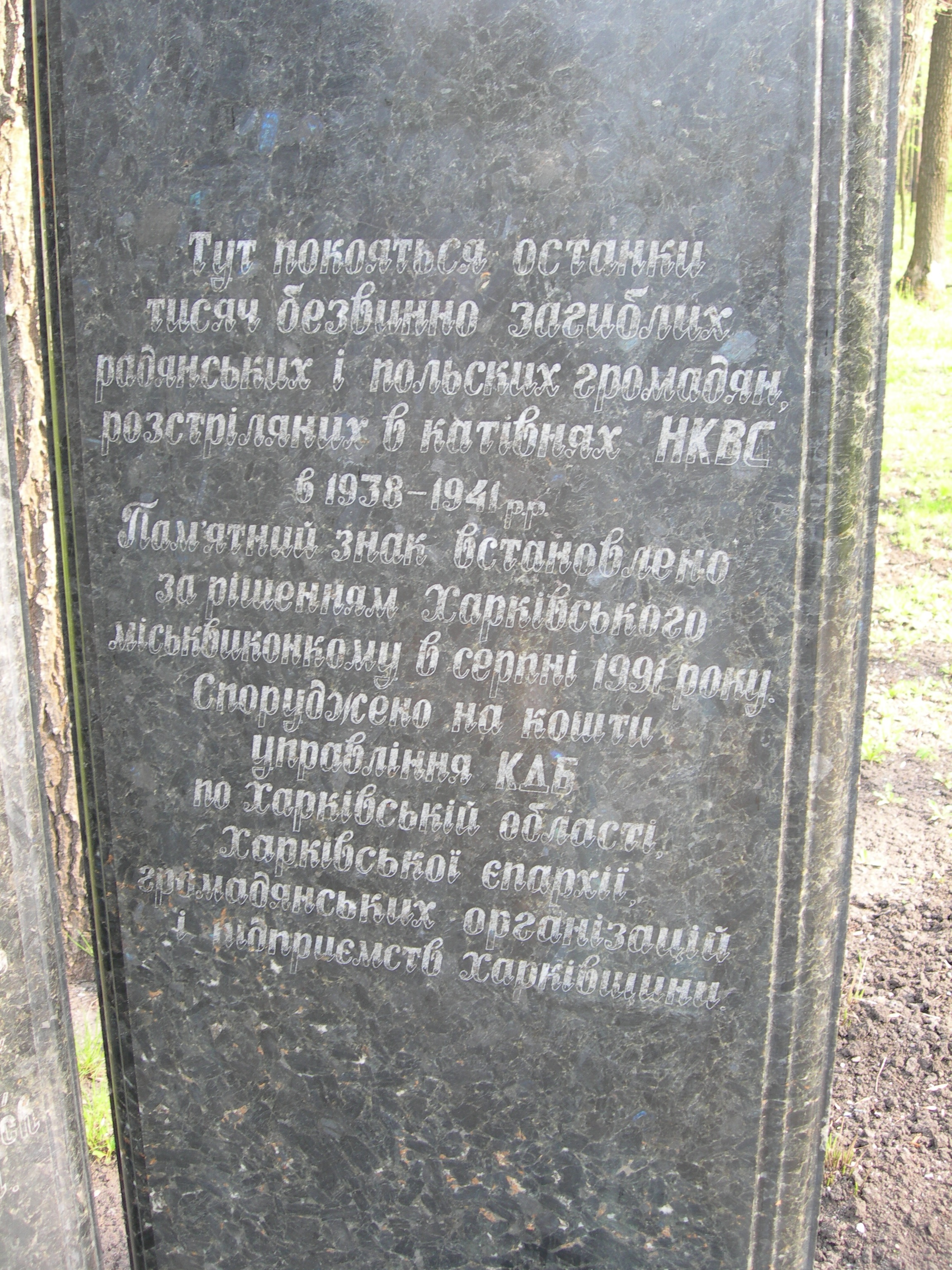
Entrance to memorial

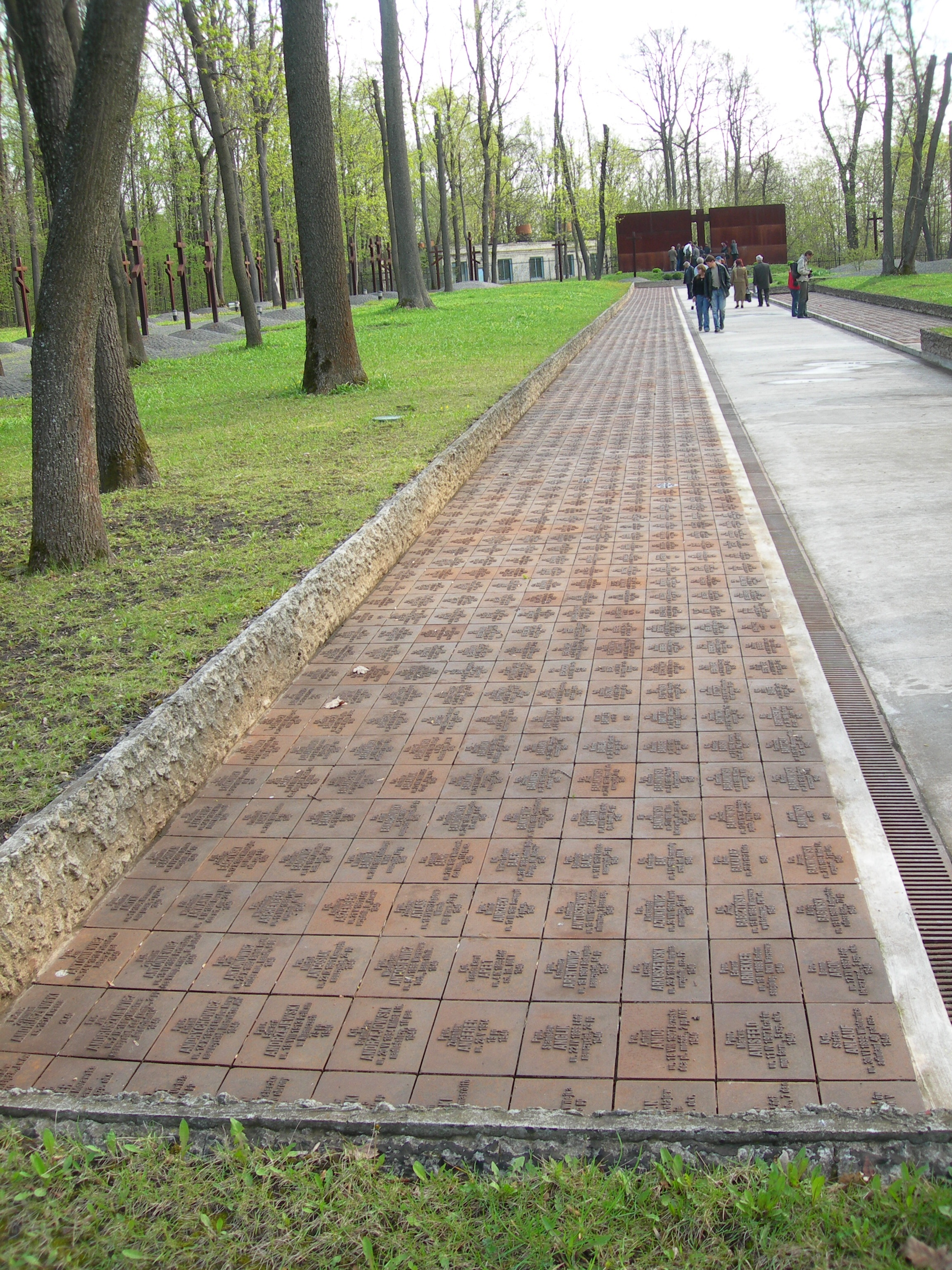
Katyn-Kharkiv memorial

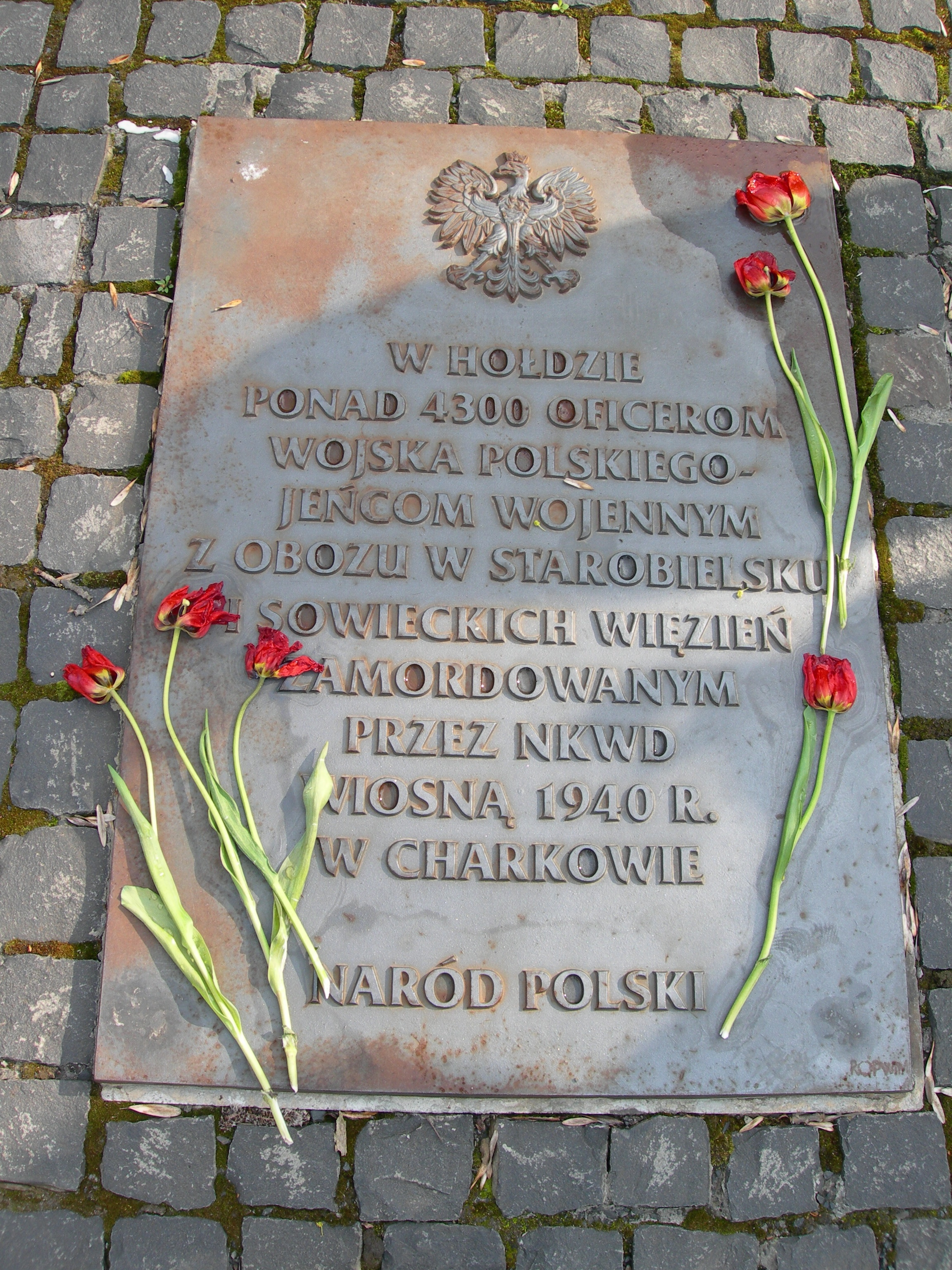
Katyn-Kharkiv memorial

Piatykhatky (Ukrainian: П'ятихатки; Russian: Пятихатки) is a former khutir, now a neighborhood within the city of Kharkiv, Ukraine. The neighborhood is part of the city Kyivskyi District of Kharkiv.

Located near the mass burial site of KGB massacres of then Soviet citizens in the late 1930s, and Polish military officers who were Soviet prisoners of war in 1940.

In the 1950s, it became part of the city of Kharkiv, when construction of the Kharkiv Institute of Physics and Technology, "New Matter", and Piatyhatky became incorporated into the city.

== Burials and memorial complex in Lisopark ==
The Burial site was located in a forest reserve about 5 km from the outskirts of Kharkiv (currently within the city limits and known as Lisopark neighborhood).

In the late 1930s it was a remote and sparsely populated area. According to local residents, the site was secured and surrounded by a fence at that time. After World War II the site was abandoned. In the late 1950s – early 1960s, a nuclear research facility of Kharkiv Institute of Physics and Technology (Харківський фізико-технічний інститут) and а residential area were built about 1 km from burial site. As a result of the influx of new residents into this previously sparsely populated area, the burial site was discovered by children playing in the woods exploring the surrounding area. Children would find on the surface and in shallow graves bones, skulls, pieces of uniform (buttons, insignias, etc.) of Polish and Soviet Armies and bring them home and to school. It was common knowledge among local residents that it was burial site of Polish officers executed in 1940, although authorities denied any knowledge of this. Later a recreational area for KGB employees was built on the site. Authorities continued to deny any knowledge of this burial site until the early 1990s, when the government of the newly independent Ukraine admitted it was the burial site of Polish officers as well as Soviet citizens executed by Stalin's regime in the 1930s.

=== Memorial complex ===
A memorial complex (50°04′50″N 36°15′45″E) named "Memorial to the Victims of Totalitarianism" (Ukrainian: Меморіал жертв тоталітаризму) was built between 1991 and 2000 in memory of the Ukrainian intellectuals murdered by the Soviet secret police (the NKVD) in 1937–38, and also several thousand Polish officers in 1940, murdered as part of the Katyn massacre.

The site was funded by the Polish government and erected by the local population. It contains a bell set into the ground that chimes on the hour. Individual plaques for each of the Polish officers murdered at the site, including their name, rank and city of birth are laid out row after row after row.

The names of Ukrainian intellectuals, primarily Ukrainian writers, dramatists, musicians, professors, lecturers are carved into a memorial wall made of steel that is constantly rusting, giving the impression of constantly bleeding.

The Memorial was damaged during the 2022 Russian invasion of Ukraine. On 8 May 2022, fragments of a Russian missile that struck the memorial were cleaned up.

== See also ==
- Bykivnia
