= Belarusian Katyn List =

Hypothetical list of Poles murdered in Belarus by the NKVD

The Belarusian Katyn List (Polish: Białoruska Lista Katyńska) is the (hypothetical) list of Polish citizens murdered by the NKVD in Belarus on the basis of the decision of the Politburo of the All-Union Communist Party (Bolsheviks) and the USSR state authorities of 5 March 1940, the victims of the Katyn massacre.

Indirectly it was established how many persons must be on the list. A 1969 note of the chief of KGB Aleksandr Shelepin to Nikita Khrushchev says that 7,305 Polish citizens were killed in Ukraine and Belarus. Since the number from the Ukrainian Katyn List is already known to be 3,435, the number of 3,870 was deduced. However unlike the Ukrainian list, the actual Belarusian list is not found yet, the Belarusian authorities being uncooperative.
