= Katyn massacre =

Soviet massacre of Polish military officers and intelligentsia in 1940

Coordinates: 54°46′20″N 31°47′24″E

- Part of the aftermath of the Soviet invasion of Poland during World War II and Soviet repressions of Poles
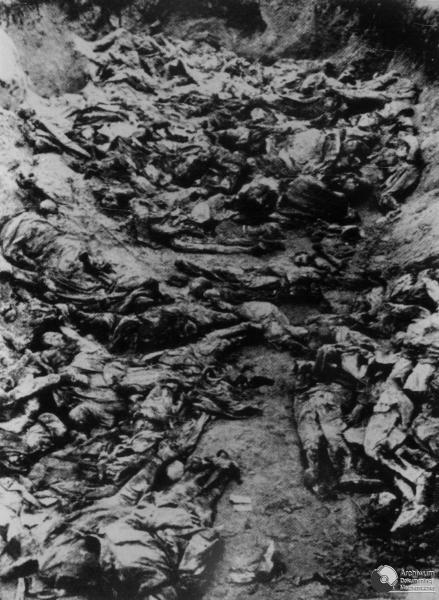
- Mass grave of Polish officers in Katyn Forest, exhumed by Germany in 1943

- Location: Katyn Forest, Kalinin and Kharkiv prisons in Soviet Union
- Date: April–May 1940
- Target: Polish prisoners-of-war and internees (military and police officers, border guards, and intelligentsia)
- Attack type: War crime, decapitation, massacre, mass killing, Crimes against humanity
- Deaths: 21,857
- Perpetrator: NKVD
- Motive: Anti-Polish sentiment; destruction of Polish leadership and Intelligentsia; Sovietisation

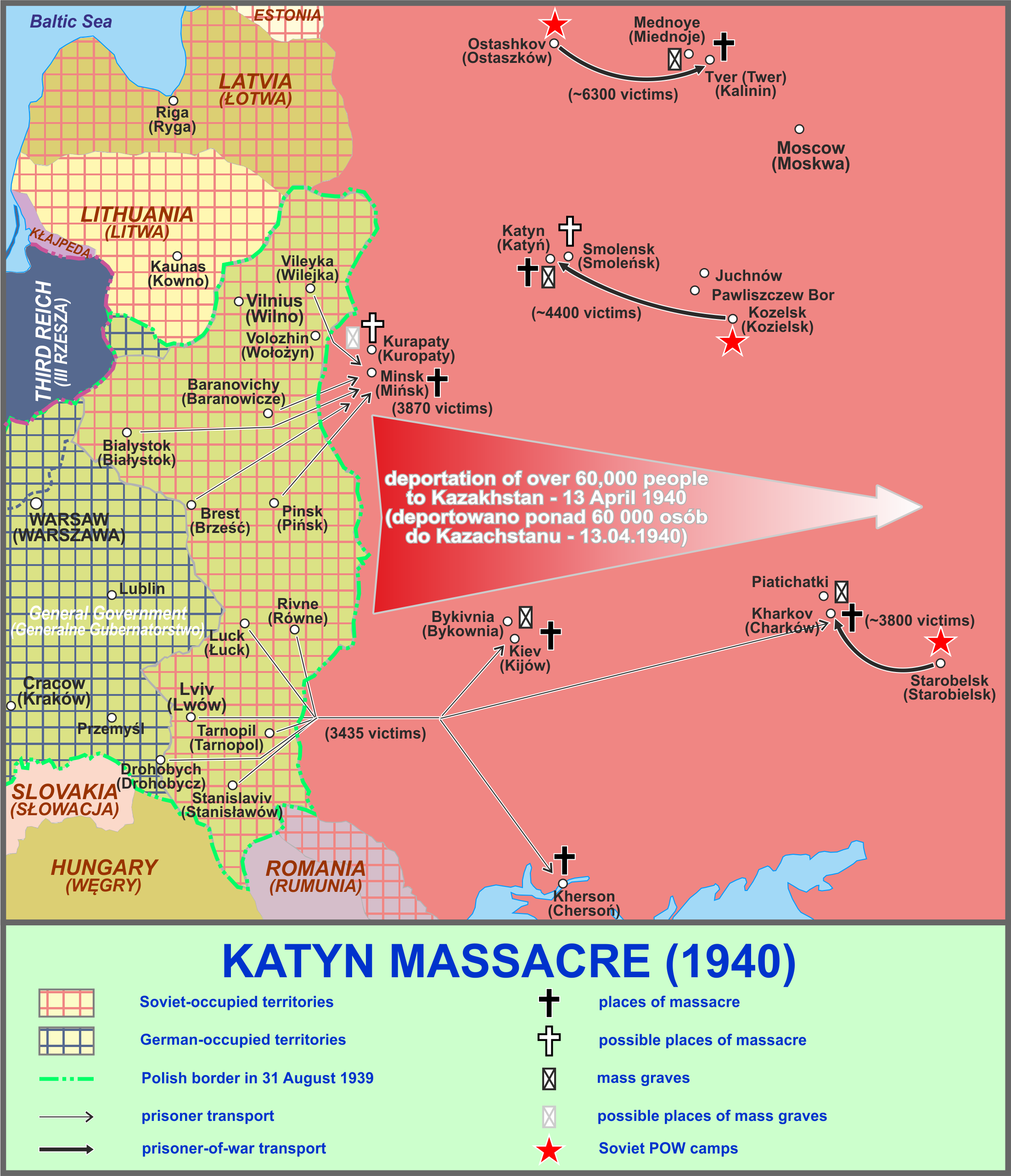
The sites related to the Katyn massacre

The Katyn massacre (Note: Polish: zbrodnia katyńska, "Katyń crime"; Russian: Катынская резня Katynskaya reznya, "Katyn massacre", or Russian: Катынский расстрел, Katynsky rasstrel, "Katyn execution") was a series of mass executions of Poles carried out by the Soviet Union between April and May 1940. Though the killings also occurred in the NKVD prisons in Kalinin, Kharkiv and elsewhere, the massacre is named after the Katyn forest, where some of the mass graves were first discovered by Nazi German forces in 1943. Nearly 22,000 Polish military and police officers, border guards, and intelligentsia were executed by the NKVD (Soviet secret police), on Joseph Stalin's orders.

The massacre is qualified as a crime against humanity, a crime against peace, a war crime and (within the Polish Penal Code) a Communist crime. According to a 2009 resolution of the Polish parliament's Sejm, it bears the hallmarks of a genocide.

The order to execute captive members of the Polish officer corps was secretly issued by the Soviet Politburo led by Stalin. Of the total killed, about 8,000 were officers imprisoned during the 1939 Soviet invasion of Poland, another 6,000 were police officers, and the remaining 8,000 were Polish intelligentsia, the Soviets deemed to be "intelligence agents and gendarmes, spies and saboteurs, former landowners, factory owners and officials". The Polish Army officer class was representative of the multi-ethnic Polish state; the murdered included ethnic Poles, Ukrainians, Belarusians, and 700–900 Polish Jews.

The government of Nazi Germany announced the discovery of mass graves in the Katyn Forest in April 1943. Stalin severed diplomatic relations with the London-based Polish government-in-exile when it asked for an investigation by the International Committee of the Red Cross. After the Vistula–Oder offensive, where the mass graves fell into Soviet control, the Soviet Union claimed the Nazis had killed the victims, and it continued to deny responsibility for the massacres until December 1989, when it officially acknowledged and condemned the killings by the NKVD, as well as the subsequent cover-up by the Soviet government.

An investigation conducted by the office of the prosecutors general of the Soviet Union (1990–1991) and the Russian Federation (1991–2004) confirmed Soviet responsibility for the massacres, but refused to classify this action as a war crime or as an act of mass murder. The investigation was closed on the grounds that the perpetrators were dead, and since the Russian government would not classify the dead as victims of the Great Purge, formal posthumous rehabilitation was deemed inapplicable. In November 2010, hoping to improve relations with Poland, the Russian State Duma approved a declaration condemning Stalin and other Soviet officials for ordering the massacre. In 2021, the Russian Ministry of Culture downgraded the memorial complex at Katyn on its Register of Sites of Cultural Heritage from a place of federal to one of regional importance.

== Background ==
=== Invasion of Poland ===
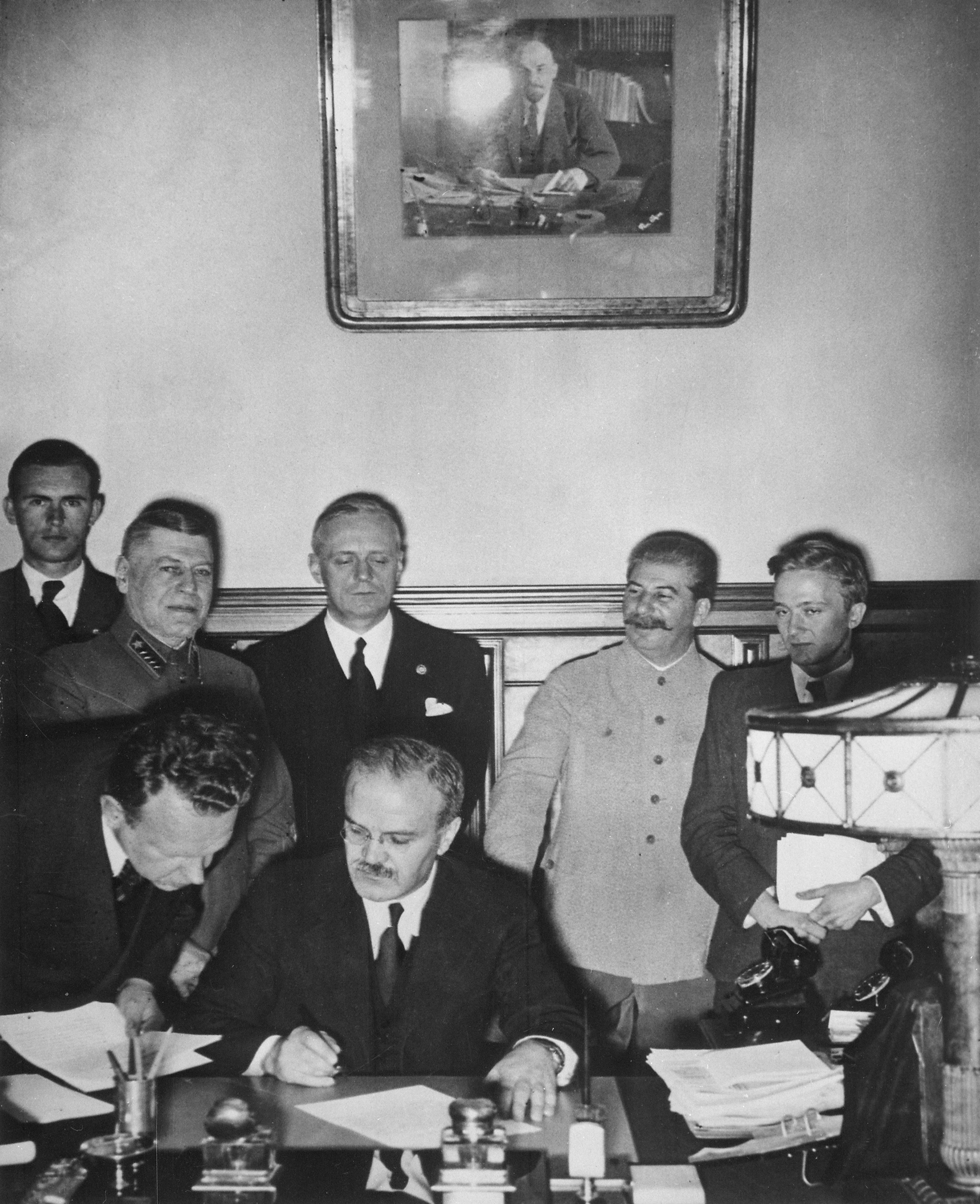
Soviet Foreign Minister Vyacheslav Molotov signs the Molotov–Ribbentrop Pact. Behind him: Ribbentrop and Stalin.

On 1 September 1939, the invasion of Poland by Nazi Germany began. Consequently, Britain and France, fulfilling the Anglo-Polish and Franco-Polish treaties of alliance, declared war on Germany. Despite these declarations of war, the two nations undertook minimal military activity during what became known as the Phoney War.

The Soviet invasion of Poland began on 17 September, in accordance with the Molotov–Ribbentrop Pact. The Red Army advanced quickly and met little resistance, as Polish forces facing them were under orders not to engage the Soviets. About 250,000 to 454,700 Polish soldiers and policemen were captured and interned by the Soviet authorities. Most were freed or escaped quickly, but 125,000 were imprisoned in camps run by the NKVD. Of these, 42,400 soldiers, mostly of Ukrainian and Belarusian ethnicity serving in the Polish Army, who lived in the territories of Poland annexed by the Soviet Union, were released in October. The 43,000 soldiers born in western Poland, then under Nazi control, were transferred to the Germans; in turn, the Soviets received 13,575 Polish prisoners from the Germans.

=== Polish prisoners of war ===
Soviet repressions of Polish citizens occurred as well over this period. Since Poland's conscription system required every nonexempt university graduate to become a military reserve officer, the NKVD was able to round up a significant portion of the Polish educated class as prisoners of war. According to estimates by the Institute of National Remembrance (IPN), roughly 320,000 Polish citizens were deported to the Soviet Union (this figure is questioned by other historians, who hold to older estimates of about 700,000–1,000,000). IPN estimates the number of Polish citizens who died under Soviet rule during World War II at 150,000 (a revision of older estimates of up to 500,000). Of the group of 12,000 Poles sent to Dalstroy camp (near Kolyma) in 1940–1941, mostly POWs, only 583 men survived; they were released in 1942 to join the Polish Armed Forces in the East. According to Tadeusz Piotrowski, "during the war and after 1944, 570,387 Polish citizens had been subjected to some form of Soviet political repression". As early as 19 September 1939, the head of the NKVD, Lavrentiy Beria, ordered the secret police to create the Main Administration for Affairs of Prisoners of War and Internees to manage Polish prisoners. The NKVD took custody of Polish prisoners from the Red Army, and proceeded to organise a network of reception centres and transit camps, and to arrange rail transport to prisoner-of-war camps in the western USSR. The largest camps were at Kozelsk (Optina Monastery), Ostashkov (Stolobny Island on Lake Seliger near Ostashkov), and Starobilsk. Other camps were at Jukhnovo (rail station Babynino), Yuzhe (Talitsy), rail station Tyotkino (90 kilometres (56 mi) from Putyvl), Kozelshchyna, Oranki, Vologda (rail station Zaonikeevo), and Gryazovets.

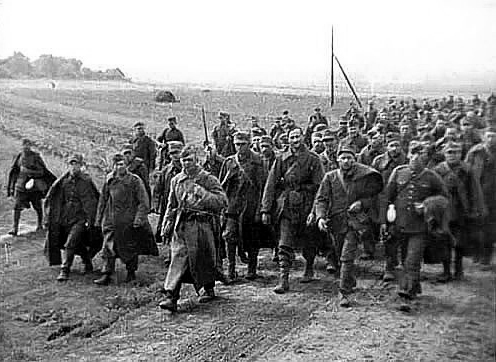
Polish POWs captured by the Red Army during the Soviet invasion of Poland

Kozelsk and Starobelsk were used mainly for military officers, while Ostashkov was used mainly for Polish Scouting, gendarmes, police officers, and prison officers. Some prisoners were members of other groups of Polish intelligentsia, such as priests, landowners, and law personnel. The approximate distribution of men throughout the camps was as follows: Kozelsk, 5,000; Ostashkov, 6,570; and Starobelsk, 4,000. They totalled 15,570 men.

According to a report from 19 November 1939, the NKVD had about 40,000 Polish POWs: 8,000–8,500 officers and warrant officers, 6,000–6,500 officers of police, and 25,000 soldiers and non-commissioned officers who were still being held as POWs. In December, a wave of arrests resulted in the imprisonment of additional Polish officers. Ivan Serov reported to Lavrentiy Beria on 3 December that "in all, 1,057 former officers of the Polish Army had been arrested". The 25,000 soldiers and non-commissioned officers were assigned to forced labor (road construction, heavy metallurgy).

=== Preparations ===
Once at the camps, from October 1939 to February 1940, the Poles were subjected to lengthy interrogations and constant political pressure by NKVD officers, such as Vasily Zarubin. The prisoners assumed they would be released soon, but the interviews were in effect a selection process to determine who would live and who would die. According to NKVD reports, if a prisoner could not be induced to adopt a pro-Soviet attitude, he was declared a "hardened and uncompromising enemy of Soviet authority".

On 5 March 1940, pursuant to a note to Stalin from Beria, six members of the Soviet Politburo— Stalin, Vyacheslav Molotov, Lazar Kaganovich, Kliment Voroshilov, Anastas Mikoyan, and Mikhail Kalinin— signed an order to execute 25,700 Polish "nationalists and counterrevolutionaries" kept at camps and prisons in occupied western Ukraine and Belarus. The reason for the massacre, according to the historian Gerhard Weinberg, was that Stalin wanted to deprive a potential future Polish military of a large portion of its talent. The Soviet leadership, and Stalin in particular, viewed the Polish prisoners as a "problem" as they might resist being under Soviet rule. Therefore, they decided the prisoners inside the "special camps" were to be shot as "avowed enemies of Soviet authority".

== Executions ==
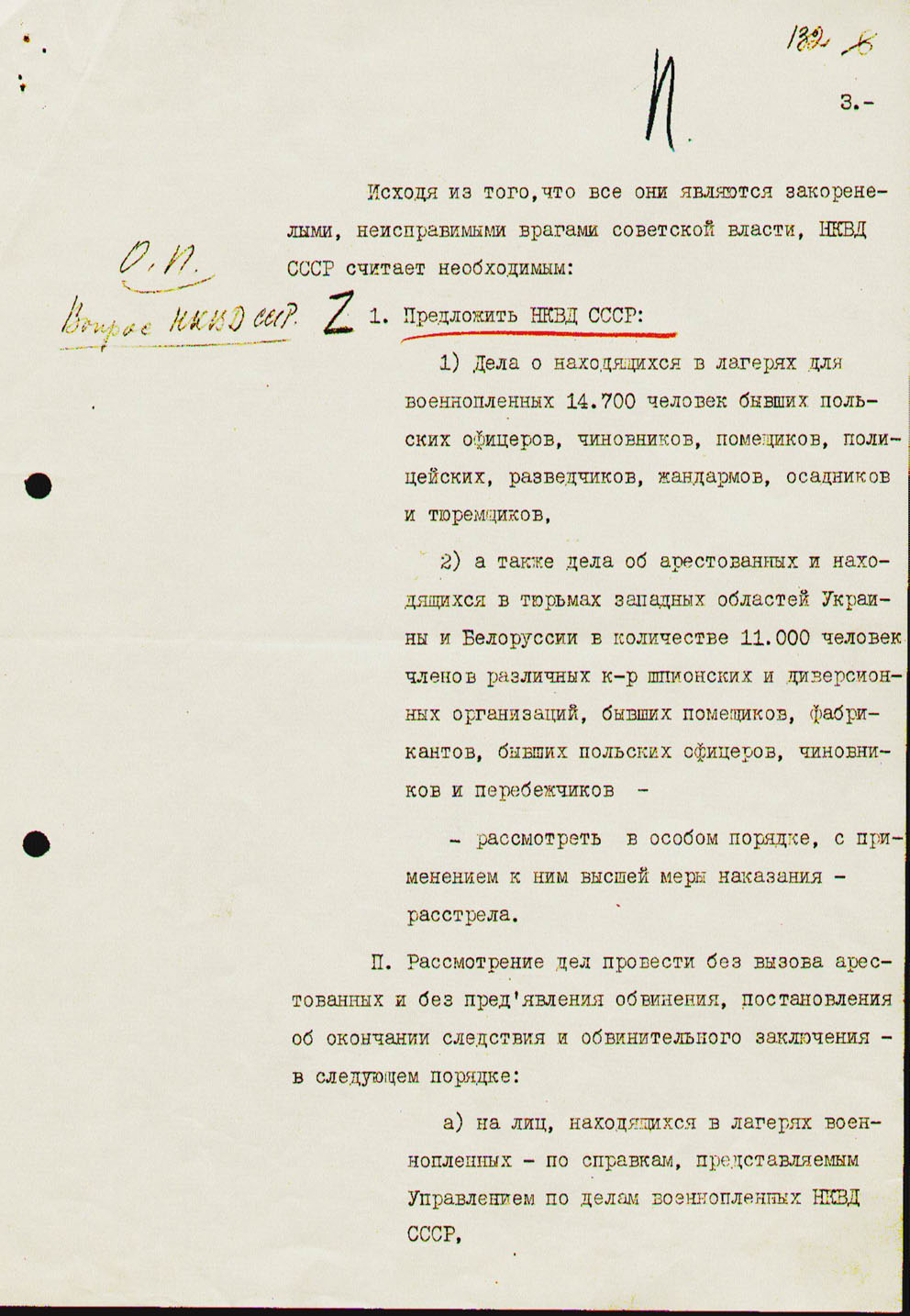
Memo from Beria to Stalin which proposed the execution of Polish officers, policemen, etc.

The number of victims is estimated at 22,000, with a lower limit of confirmed dead of 21,768. According to Soviet documents declassified in 1990, 21,857 Polish internees and prisoners were executed after 3 April 1940: 14,552 prisoners of war (most or all of them from the three camps) and 7,305 prisoners in western parts of the Byelorussian and Ukrainian SSRs. Of them 4,421 were from Kozelsk, 3,820 from Starobelsk, 6,311 from Ostashkov, and 7,305 from Byelorussian and Ukrainian prisons.

The head of the NKVD Administration for Affairs of Prisoners of War and Internees, Pyotr Soprunenko, a Major-General born near Kiev in the Ukrainian SSR was involved in "selections" of Polish officers to be executed at Katyn and elsewhere. Soprunenko was an NKVD captain in early 1940 and headed the organization, also called the Directorate for Prisoners of War Affairs and Internees, from September 1939 to February 1943. In this capacity, he was reportedly involved in the planning and operational control of the executions, in following with Beria's and Merkulov's orders.

Those who died at Katyn included soldiers (an admiral, two generals, 24 colonels, 79 lieutenant colonels, 258 majors, 654 captains, 17 naval captains, 85 privates, 3,420 non-commissioned officers, and seven chaplains), 200 pilots, government representatives and royalty (a prince, 43 officials), and civilians (three landowners, 131 refugees, 20 university professors, 300 physicians; several hundred lawyers, engineers, and teachers; and more than 100 writers and journalists). In all, the NKVD executed almost half the Polish officer corps. Altogether, during the massacre, the NKVD executed 14 Polish generals: Leon Billewicz (ret.), Bronisław Bohaterewicz (ret.), Xawery Czernicki (admiral), Stanisław Haller (ret.), Aleksander Kowalewski, Henryk Minkiewicz (ret.), Kazimierz Orlik-Łukoski, Konstanty Plisowski (ret.), Rudolf Prich (killed in Lviv), Franciszek Sikorski (ret.), Leonard Skierski (ret.), Piotr Skuratowicz, Mieczysław Smorawiński, and Alojzy Wir-Konas (promoted posthumously). Not all of the executed were ethnic Poles, because the Second Polish Republic was a multiethnic state, and its officer corps included Belarusians, Ukrainians, and Jews. It is estimated about 8% of the Katyn massacre victims were Polish Jews. 395 prisoners were spared from the slaughter, among them Stanisław Swianiewicz and Józef Czapski. They were taken to the Yukhnov camp or Pavlishtchev Bor and then to Gryazovets. Up to 99% of the remaining prisoners were killed. People from the Kozelsk camp were executed in Katyn Forest; people from the Starobelsk camp were killed in the inner NKVD prison of Kharkiv (among the victims was Józef Marcinkiewicz) and the bodies were buried near the village of Piatykhatky; and police officers from the Ostashkov camp were killed in the internal NKVD prison in Kalinin (Tver) and buried in Mednoye. All three burial sites had already been secret cemeteries of the victims of the Great Purge of 1937–1938. Later, recreational areas of NKVD/KGB were established there.

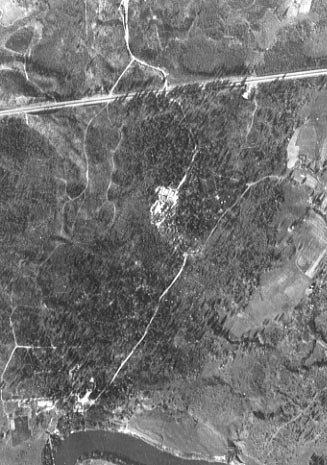
Aerial view of the Katyn massacre grave

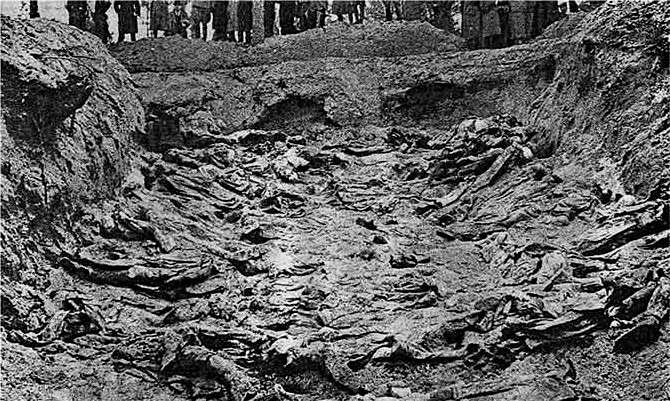
A mass grave at Katyn, 1943

Detailed information on the executions in the Kalinin NKVD prison was provided during a hearing by Dmitry Tokarev, former head of the Board of the District NKVD in Kalinin. According to Tokarev, the shooting started in the evening and ended at dawn. The first transport, on 4 April 1940, carried 390 people, and the executioners had difficulty killing so many people in one night. The following transports held no more than 250 people. The executions were usually performed with German-made .25 ACP Walther Model 2 pistols supplied by Moscow, but Soviet-made 7.62×38mmR Nagant M1895 revolvers were also used. The executioners used German weapons rather than the standard Soviet revolvers, as the latter were said to offer too much recoil, which made shooting painful after the first dozen executions. Vasily Mikhailovich Blokhin, chief executioner for the NKVD, is reported to have personally shot and killed 7,000 of the condemned, some as young as 18, from the Ostashkov camp at Kalinin prison, over 28 days in April 1940.

After the condemned individual's personal information was checked and approved, he was handcuffed and led to a cell insulated with stacks of sandbags along the walls, and a heavy, felt-lined door. The victim was told to kneel in the middle of the cell and was then approached from behind by the executioner and immediately shot in the back of the head or neck. The body was carried out through the opposite door and laid in one of the five or six waiting trucks, whereupon the next condemned was taken inside and subjected to the same treatment. In addition to muffling by the rough insulation in the execution cell, the pistol gunshots were masked by the operation of loud machines (perhaps fans) throughout the night. Some post-1991 revelations suggest prisoners were also executed in the same manner at the NKVD headquarters in Smolensk, though judging by the way the corpses were stacked, some captives may have been shot while standing on the edge of the mass graves. This procedure went on every night, except for the public May Day holiday.

Some 3,000 to 4,000 Polish inmates of Ukrainian prisons and those from Belarus prisons were probably buried in Bykivnia and in Kurapaty respectively, about 50 women including two sisters, Klara Auerbach-Margules and Stella Menkes, among them. Lieutenant Janina Lewandowska, daughter of Gen. Józef Dowbor-Muśnicki, was the only woman POW executed during the massacre at Katyn.

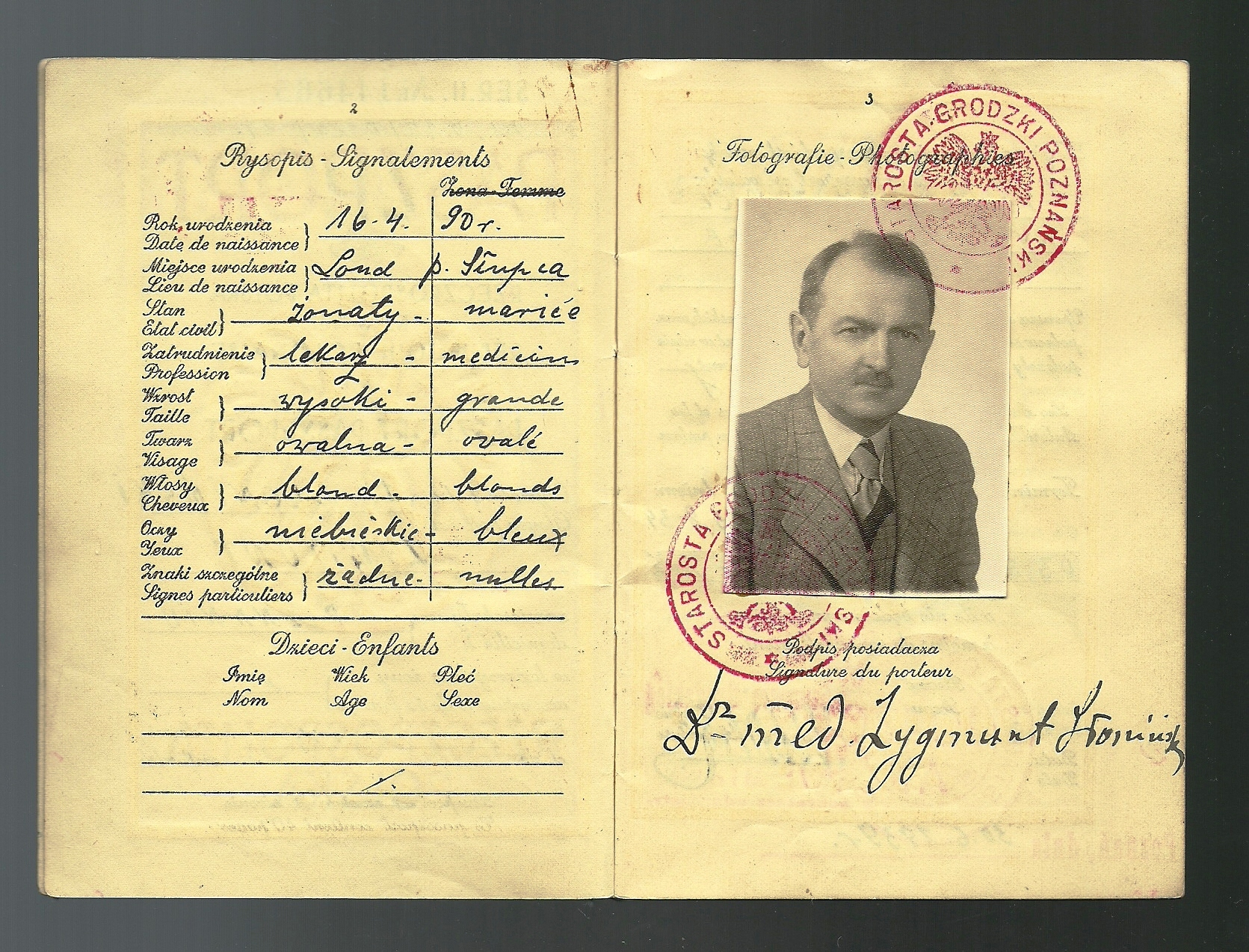
1939 Polish passport issued to Medical Service Reserve Major Dr. Zygmunt Słoniński who was murdered at Katyn

== Discovery ==
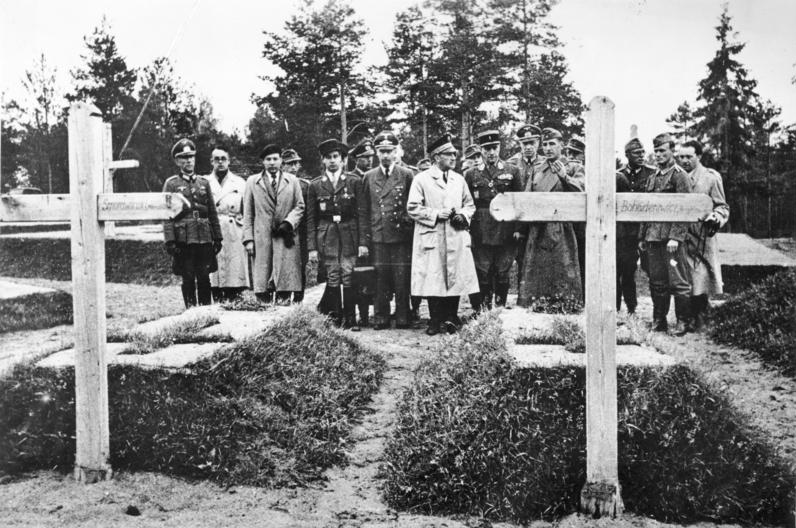
Secretary of State of the Vichy regime Fernand de Brinon and others in Katyn at the graves of Mieczysław Smorawiński and Bronisław Bohaterewicz, April 1943

The question about the fate of the Polish prisoners was raised soon after Operation Barbarossa began in June 1941. The Polish government-in-exile and the Soviet government signed the Sikorski–Mayski agreement, which announced the willingness of both to fight together against Nazi Germany and for a Polish army to be formed on Soviet territory. The Polish general Władysław Anders began organizing this army, and soon he requested information about the missing Polish officers. During a personal meeting, Stalin assured him and Władysław Sikorski, the Polish Prime Minister, all the Poles were freed, and not all could be accounted because the Soviets "lost track" of them in Manchuria. Józef Czapski investigated the fate of Polish officers between 1941 and 1942. In 1942, with the territory around Smolensk under German occupation, captive Polish railroad workers heard from the locals about a mass grave of Polish soldiers at Kozelsk near Katyn; finding one of the graves, they reported it to the Polish Underground State. The discovery was not seen as important, as nobody thought the discovered grave could contain so many victims.

=== German announcement ===
In early 1943, Rudolf Christoph Freiherr von Gersdorff, a German officer serving as the intelligence liaison between the Wehrmacht's Army Group Centre and Abwehr, received reports about mass graves of Polish military officers. These reports stated the graves were in the forest of Goat Hill near Katyn. He passed the reports to his superiors (sources vary on when exactly the Germans became aware of the graves – from "late 1942" to January–February 1943, and when the German top decision makers in Berlin received those reports [as early as 1 March or as late as 4 April]).

Joseph Goebbels saw this discovery as an excellent tool to drive a wedge between Poland, the Western Allies, and the Soviet Union, and reinforcement for the Nazi propaganda line about the horrors of Bolshevism, and American and British subservience to it. After extensive preparation, on 13 April, Reichssender Berlin broadcast to the world that German military forces in the Katyn forest near Smolensk had uncovered

"a ditch…28 metres long and 16 metres wide [92 ft by 52 ft], in which the bodies of 3,000 Polish officers were piled up in 12 layers".

The broadcast went on to charge the Soviets with carrying out the massacre in 1940.

==== Initial investigation ====
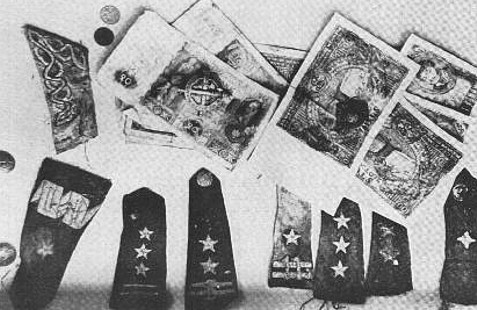
Polish banknotes, collar insignia and epaulets recovered from mass graves

The Germans brought in a European Red Cross committee called the Katyn Commission, comprising 12 forensic experts and their staff, from occupied Belgium, Bulgaria, Croatia, Denmark, Finland, Vichy France, Hungary, Italy, the occupied Netherlands, Romania, Switzerland, (Note: François Naville, Swiss physician and director of the medico-legal Institute of the University of Geneva, was the only truly neutral expert participating in the international commission.) and occupied Bohemia and Moravia. The Germans were so intent on proving the Soviets were behind the massacre they even included some Allied prisoners of war, among them writer Ferdynand Goetel, a Polish Home Army prisoner from Pawiak. After the war, Goetel escaped with a fake passport due to an arrest warrant issued against him. Jan Emil Skiwski was a collaborator. Józef Mackiewicz has published several texts about the crime. Two of the 12, the Bulgarian Marko Markov and the Czech František Hájek, with their countries becoming satellite states of the Soviet Union, were forced to recant their evidence, defending the Soviets and blaming the Germans. The Croatian pathologist Eduard Miloslavić managed to escape to the US. The only civilian invited as a witness was Frank Stroobant, a British citizen deported from Guernsey and camp senior of Ilag VII.

The Katyn massacre was beneficial to Nazi Germany, which used it to discredit the Soviet Union. On 14 April 1943, Goebbels wrote in his diary:

"We are now using the discovery of 12,000 Polish officers, killed by the GPU, for anti-Bolshevik propaganda on a grand style. We sent neutral journalists and Polish intellectuals to the spot where they were found. Their reports now reaching us from ahead are gruesome. The Führer has also given permission for us to hand out a drastic news item to the German press. I gave instructions to make the widest possible use of the propaganda material. We shall be able to live on it for a couple of weeks."

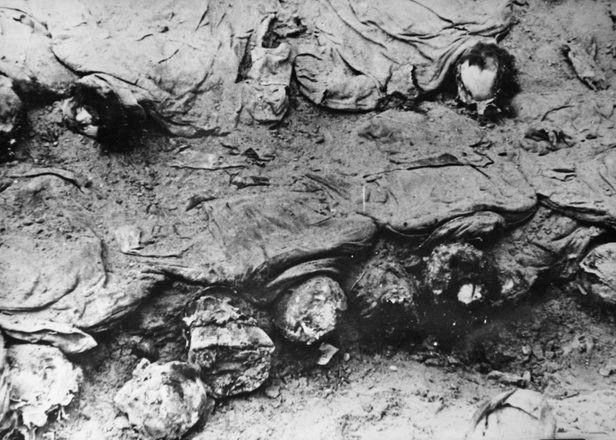
Katyn exhumation, 1943

When Goebbels was informed in September 1943 that the German Army had to withdraw from the Katyn area, he wrote a prediction in his diary. His entry for 29 September 1943 reads:

"Unfortunately, we have had to give up Katyn. The Bolsheviks undoubtedly will soon 'find' that we shot 12,000 Polish officers. That episode is one that is going to cause us quite a little trouble in the future. The Soviets are undoubtedly going to make it their business to discover as many mass-graves as possible and then blame it on us."

=== Polish reaction ===
The Polish government-in-exile led by Sikorski insisted on bringing the matter to the negotiation table with the Soviets and on opening an investigation by the International Red Cross. On 17 April 1943 the Polish government issued a statement on this issue, asking for a Red Cross investigation, which was rejected by Stalin, who used the fact that Germans also requested such an investigation as a "proof" of Polish-German conspiracy, and which led to a deterioration of Polish-Soviet relations.

According to the Polish diplomat Edward Bernard Raczyński, Raczyński and General Sikorski met privately with Churchill and Alexander Cadogan on 15 April 1943, and told them the Poles had proof the Soviets were responsible for the massacre. Churchill reportedly stated, "The Bolsheviks can be very cruel." According to Raczyński, "Churchill... without committing himself, showed by his manner that he had no doubt of it."

In 1947, the Polish Government in exile 1944–1946 report on Katyn was transmitted to Telford Taylor.

=== Soviet response ===
The Soviet government immediately denied the German charges. They claimed the Polish prisoners of war had been engaged in construction work west of Smolensk, and consequently were captured and executed by invading German units in August 1941. The Soviet response on 15 April to the initial German broadcast of 13 April, prepared by the Soviet Information Bureau, stated, "Polish prisoners-of-war who in 1941 were engaged in construction work west of Smolensk and who...fell into the hands of the German-Fascist hangmen".

In response to Polish demands, Stalin accused the Polish government of collaborating with Nazi Germany and broke off diplomatic relations with it. The Soviet Union also started a campaign to get the Western Allies to recognize the pro-Soviet government-in-exile of the Union of Polish Patriots led by Wanda Wasilewska.

Having retaken the Katyn area almost immediately after the Red Army had recaptured Smolensk, around September–October 1943, NKVD forces began a cover-up operation. They destroyed a cemetery the Germans had permitted the Polish Red Cross to build and removed other evidence. Witnesses were "interviewed" and threatened with arrest for collaborating with the Nazis if their testimonies disagreed with the official line. As none of the documents found on the dead had dates later than April 1940, the Soviet secret police planted false evidence to place the apparent time of the massacre in mid-1941, when the German military had controlled the area. NKVD operatives Vsevolod Merkulov and Sergei Kruglov issued a preliminary report, dated 10–11 January 1944, that concluded the Polish officers were shot by German soldiers.

In January 1944, the Soviet Extraordinary State Commission for ascertaining and investigating crimes perpetrated by the German-Fascist invaders set up another commission, the Special Commission for Determination and Investigation of the Shooting of Polish Prisoners of War by German-Fascist Invaders in Katyn Forest (Специальная комиссия по установлению и расследованию обстоятельств расстрела немецко-фашистскими захватчиками в Катынском лесу (близ Смоленска) военнопленных польских офицеров). The commission's name implied a predestined conclusion. It was headed by Nikolai Burdenko, the president of the USSR Academy of Medical Sciences, hence the commission is often known as the "Burdenko Commission", who was appointed by Moscow to investigate the incident. Its members included prominent Soviet figures such as the writer Aleksey Nikolayevich Tolstoy, but no foreign personnel was allowed to join the commission. The Burdenko Commission exhumed the bodies, rejected the 1943 German findings the Poles were shot by the Soviet army, assigned the guilt to the Nazis, and concluded all the shootings were done by German occupation forces in late 1941. It is uncertain how many members of the commission were misled by the falsified reports and evidence, and how many actually suspected the truth. Cienciala and Materski note the commission had no choice but to issue findings in line with the Merkulov-Kruglov report, and Burdenko was likely aware of the cover-up. He reportedly admitted something like that to friends and family shortly before his death in 1946. The Burdenko Commission's conclusions would be consistently cited by Soviet sources until the official admission of guilt by the Soviet government on 13 April 1990.

In January 1944, the Soviets also invited a group of more than a dozen mostly American and British journalists, accompanied by Kathleen Harriman, the daughter of the new American ambassador W. Averell Harriman, and John F. Melby, third secretary at the American embassy in Moscow, to Katyn. Some regarded the inclusion of Melby and Harriman as a Soviet attempt to lend official weight to their propaganda. Melby's report noted the deficiencies in the Soviet case: problematic witnesses; attempts to discourage questioning of the witnesses; statements of the witnesses obviously being given as a result of rote memorization; and that "the show was put on for the benefit of the correspondents." Nevertheless, Melby, at the time, felt on balance the Soviet case was convincing. Harriman's report reached the same conclusion and after the war both were asked to explain why their conclusions seemed to be at odds with their findings, with the suspicion the conclusions were what the State Department wanted to hear. The journalists were less impressed and not convinced by the staged Soviet demonstration.

An example of Soviet propaganda spread by some Western Communists is Alter Brody's monograph Behind the Polish-Soviet Break (with an introduction by Corliss Lamont).

=== Western reaction ===
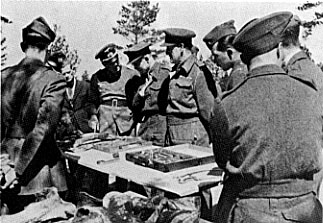
British, Canadian, and American officers (POWs) brought by the Germans to view the exhumations

The growing Polish-Soviet tension was beginning to strain Western-Soviet relations at a time when the Poles' importance to the Allies, significant in the first years of the war, was beginning to fade. In retrospective review of records, both British prime minister Winston Churchill and U.S. president Franklin D. Roosevelt were increasingly torn between their commitments to their Polish ally and the demands by Stalin and his diplomats.

On 24 April 1943, British Foreign Secretary Anthony Eden "prevailed upon Sikorski... to withdraw the request for the Red Cross investigation", and Churchill subsequently assured Stalin, "We shall certainly oppose vigorously any 'investigation' by the International Red Cross or any other body in any territory under German authority. Such an investigation would be a fraud and its conclusions reached by terrorism." Unofficial or classified UK documents concluded Soviet guilt was a "near certainty," but the alliance with the Soviets was deemed to be more important than moral issues; thus the official version supported the Soviets, up to censoring any contradictory accounts. Churchill asked Owen O'Malley to investigate the issue, but in a note to the Foreign Secretary he noted, "All this is merely to ascertain the facts, because we should none of us ever speak a word about it." O'Malley pointed out several inconsistencies and near impossibilities in the Soviet version.

Later, Churchill sent a copy of the report to Roosevelt on 13 August 1943. The report deconstructed the Soviet account of the massacre and alluded to the political consequences within a strongly moral framework but recognized there was no viable alternative to the existing policy. No comment by Roosevelt on the O'Malley report has been found. Churchill's own post-war account of the Katyn affair gives little further insight. In his memoirs, he refers to the 1944 Soviet inquiry into the massacre, which found the Germans responsible, and adds, "belief seems an act of faith."

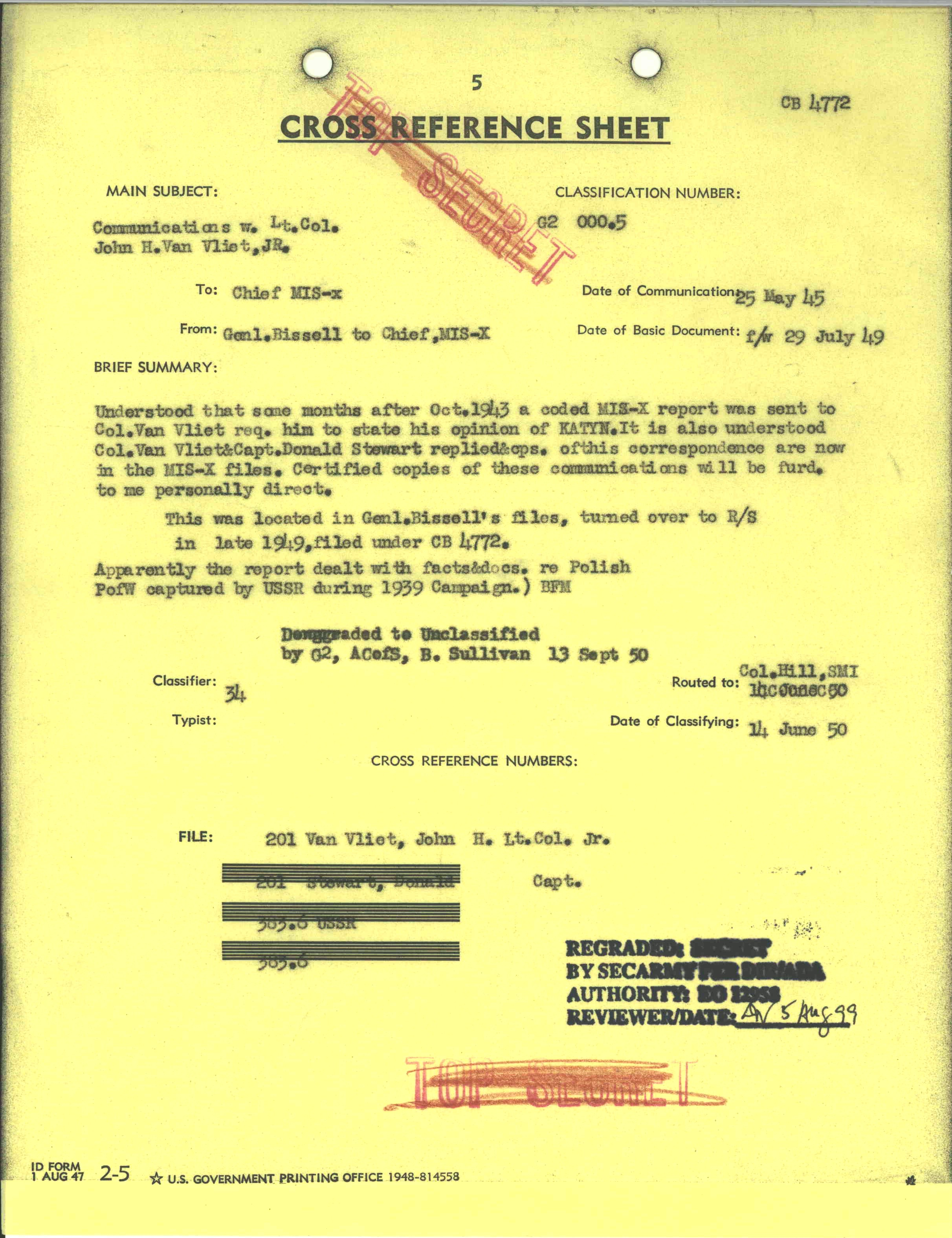
Lt. Col. John H. Van Vliet Jr communication on Katyn

At the beginning of 1944, Ron Jeffery, an agent of British and Polish intelligence in occupied Poland, eluded the Abwehr and travelled to London with a report from Poland to the British government. His efforts were at first highly regarded, but subsequently ignored, which a disillusioned Jeffery later attributed to the actions of Kim Philby and other high-ranking Communist agents entrenched in the British government. Jeffery tried to inform the British government about the Katyn massacre but was as a result released from the Army.

In the United States a similar line was taken, notwithstanding two official intelligence reports into the Katyn massacre that contradicted the official position. In 1944, Roosevelt assigned his special emissary to the Balkans, Navy Lieutenant Commander George Earle, to produce a report on Katyn. Earle concluded the massacre was committed by the Soviet Union. Having consulted with Elmer Davis, director of the United States Office of War Information, Roosevelt rejected the conclusion (officially), declared he was convinced of Nazi Germany's responsibility, and ordered that Earle's report be suppressed. When Earle requested permission to publish his findings, the president issued a written order to desist. Earle was reassigned and spent the rest of the war in American Samoa.

A further report in 1945, supporting the same conclusion, was produced and stifled. In 1943, the Germans took two U.S. POWs – Capt. Donald B. Stewart and Col. John H. Van Vliet Jr – to Katyn for an international news conference. Documents released by the National Archives and Records Administration in September 2012 revealed Stewart and Van Vliet sent coded messages to their American superiors indicating they saw proof that implicated the Soviets. Three lines of evidence were cited. Firstly, the Polish corpses were in such an advanced state of decay that the Nazis could not have killed them, as they had only taken over the area in 1941. Secondly, none of the numerous Polish artifacts, such as letters, diaries, photographs and identification tags pulled from the graves, were dated later than the spring of 1940. Most incriminating was the relatively good state of the men's uniforms and boots, which showed they had not lived long after being captured. Later, in 1945, Van Vliet submitted a report concluding the Soviets were responsible for the massacre. His superior, Major General Clayton Lawrence Bissell, General George Marshall's assistant chief of staff for intelligence, destroyed the report. Washington kept the information secret, presumably to appease Stalin and not distract from the war against the Nazis. During the 1951–52 Congressional investigation into Katyn, Bissell defended his action before the United States Congress, arguing it was not in the U.S. interest to antagonize an ally (the USSR) whose assistance the nation needed against the Empire of Japan. In 1950, Van Vliet recreated his wartime report. In 2014, a copy of a report Van Vliet made in France during 1945 was discovered.

== Post-war trials ==
From 28 December 1945 to 4 January 1946, a Soviet military court in Leningrad tried seven Wehrmacht servicemen. One of them, Arno Dürre, who was charged with murdering numerous civilians using machine-guns in Soviet villages, confessed to having taken part in the burial (though not the execution) of 15,000 to 20,000 Polish POWs in Katyn. For this he was spared execution and was given 15 years of hard labor. His confession was full of absurdities, and thus he was not used as a Soviet prosecution witness during the Nuremberg trials. He later recanted his confession, claiming the investigators forced him to confess through torture.

At the London conference that drew up the indictments of German war crimes before the Nuremberg trials, the Soviet negotiators put forward the allegation, "In September 1941, 925 Polish officers who were prisoners of war were killed in the Katyn Forest near Smolensk". The US negotiators agreed to include it but were "embarrassed" by the inclusion (noting the allegation had been debated extensively in the press) and concluded it would be up to the Soviets to sustain it. At the trials in 1946, Soviet General Roman Rudenko raised the indictment, stating "one of the most important criminal acts for which the major war criminals are responsible was the mass execution of Polish prisoners of war shot in the Katyn forest near Smolensk by the German fascist invaders", but failed to make the case and the US and British judges dismissed the charges. The Soviet inclusion of Katyn massacre in Nuremberg was based on an expectation that, based on Article 21 of the IMT Charter, the Tribunal "should take judicial notice of official government documents" requiring no "proof of facts", including reports produced by various investigative commissions, which in case of Soviets was the Burdenko commission.

Only 70 years later did it become known that former OSS chief William Donovan had succeeded in getting the American delegation in Nuremberg to block the Katyn indictment. A German officer, Fabian von Schlabrendorff, who was stationed in Smolensk during the war, had convinced Donovan that the true perpetrators were the Soviets, not the Germans. It was not the purpose of the court to determine whether Germany or the Soviet Union was responsible for the crime, but rather to attribute the crime to at least one of the defendants, which the court was unable to do. (Note: As described by Iona Nikitchenko, one of the judges and a military magistrate having been involved in Stalin's show trials, "the fact that the Nazi chiefs are criminals was already established [by the declarations and agreements of the Allies]. The role of this court is thus limited to determine the precise culpability of each one [charged]".)

== 1950s ==
In 1951 and 1952, during the Korean War, a US congressional investigation chaired by representative Ray Madden and known as the Madden Committee investigated the Katyn massacre. According to the Committee conclusion: "the Katyn massacre involved some 4,243 of the 15,400 Polish Army officers and intellectual leaders who were captured by the Soviets when Russia invaded Poland in September 1939." The committee concluded that these 4,243 Poles had been killed by the NKVD and that a case should be brought to the International Court of Justice. However, the question of responsibility remained controversial in the West as well as behind the Iron Curtain. In the United Kingdom in the late 1970s, plans for a memorial to the victims bearing the date 1940 (rather than 1941) were condemned as provocative in the political climate of the Cold War. It has also been alleged that the choice made in 1969 for the location of the Byelorussian Soviet Socialist Republic war memorial at the former Belarusian village named Khatyn, the site of the 1943 Khatyn massacre, was made to cause confusion with Katyn. The two names are similar or identical in many languages, and were often confused.

In Poland, the pro-Soviet authorities following the Soviet occupation after the war covered up the matter in accordance with the official Soviet propaganda line, deliberately censoring any sources that might provide information about the crime. Katyn was a forbidden topic in post-war Poland. Censorship in the Polish People's Republic was a massive undertaking and Katyn was specifically mentioned in the "Black Book of Censorship" used by the authorities to control the media and academia. Not only did government censorship suppress all references to it, but even mentioning the atrocity was dangerous. In the late 1970s, democracy groups like the Workers' Defence Committee and the Flying University defied the censorship and discussed the massacre, in the face of arrests, beatings, detentions, and ostracism. In 1981, Polish trade union Solidarity erected a memorial with the simple inscription "Katyn, 1940". It was confiscated by the police and replaced with an official monument with the inscription: "To the Polish soldiers – victims of Hitlerite fascism – reposing in the soil of Katyn". Nevertheless, every year on the day of Zaduszki, similar memorial crosses were erected at Powązki Cemetery and numerous other places in Poland, only to be dismantled by the police. Katyn remained a political taboo in the Polish People's Republic until the fall of the Eastern Bloc in 1989.

In the Soviet Union during the 1950s, the head of KGB, Alexander Shelepin, proposed and carried out the destruction of many documents related to the Katyn massacre to minimize the chance the truth would be revealed. His 3 March 1959 note to Nikita Khrushchev, with information about the execution of 21,857 Poles and with the proposal to destroy their personal files, became one of the documents that was preserved and eventually made public.

== Revelations ==
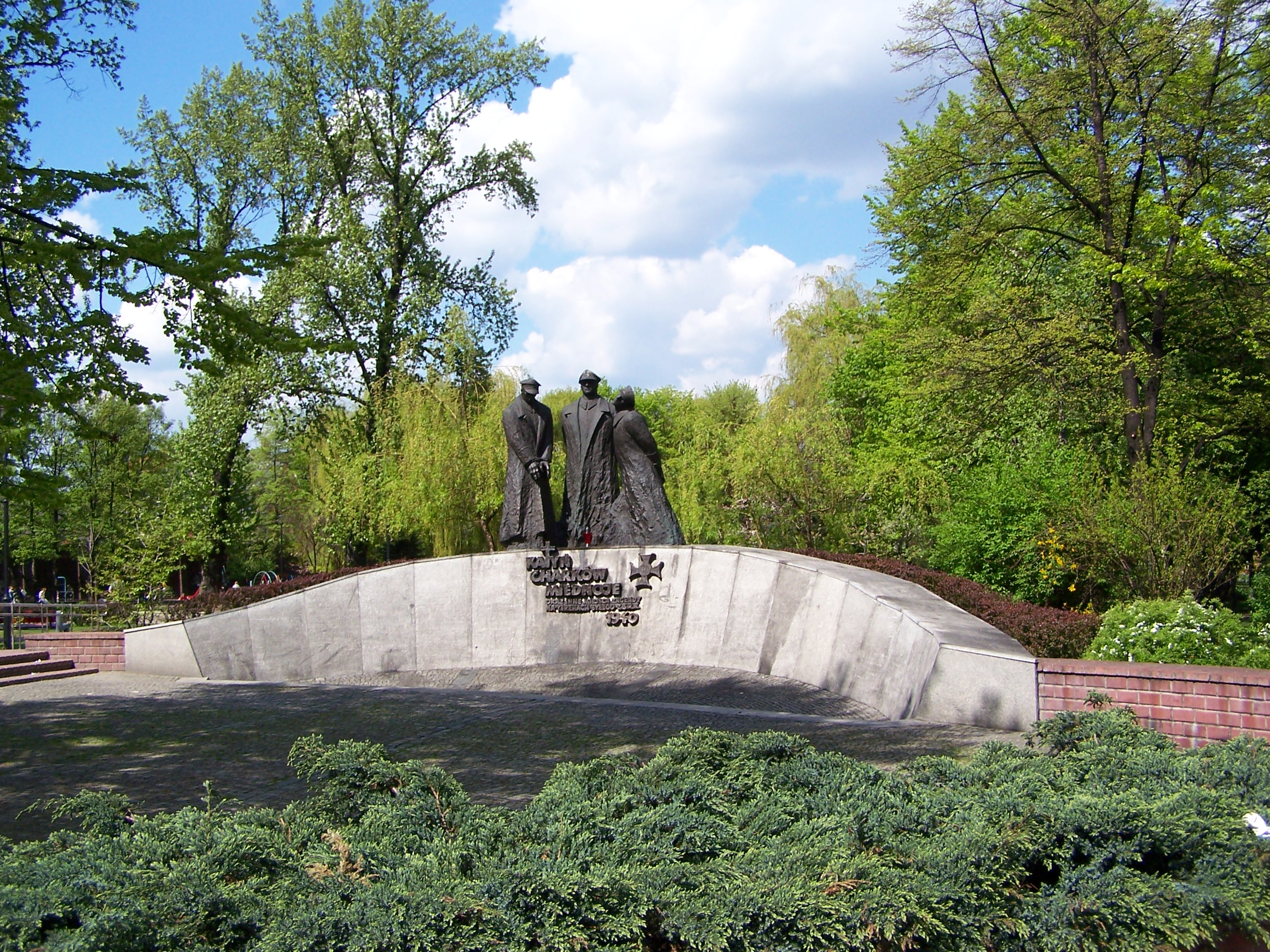
Monument in Katowice, Poland, memorializing "Katyn, Kharkiv, Mednoye and other places of killing in the former USSR in 1940"

During the 1980s, there was increasing pressure on both the Polish and Soviet governments to release documents related to the massacre. Polish academics tried to include Katyn in the agenda of the 1987 joint Polish-Soviet commission to investigate censored episodes of Polish-Russian history. In 1989, Soviet scholars revealed Stalin had indeed ordered the massacre, and in 1990 Mikhail Gorbachev admitted the NKVD had executed the Poles and confirmed two other burial sites similar to the site at Katyn: Mednoye and Piatykhatky.

On 30 October 1989, Gorbachev allowed a delegation of several hundred Poles, organized by the Polish association Families of Katyń Victims, to visit the Katyn memorial. This group included former US national security advisor Zbigniew Brzezinski. A mass was held and banners hailing the Solidarity movement were laid. One mourner affixed a sign reading "NKVD" on the memorial, covering the word "Nazis" in the inscription such that it read "In memory of Polish officers killed by the NKVD in 1941." Several visitors scaled the fence of a nearby KGB compound and left burning candles on the grounds. Brzezinski commented:

It isn't a personal pain which has brought me here, as is the case in the majority of these people, but rather recognition of the symbolic nature of Katyń. Russians and Poles, tortured to death, lie here together. It seems very important to me that the truth should be spoken about what took place, for only with the truth can the new Soviet leadership distance itself from the crimes of Stalin and the NKVD. Only the truth can serve as the basis of true friendship between the Soviet and the Polish peoples. The truth will make a path for itself. I am convinced of this by the very fact that I was able to travel here.

His remarks were given extensive coverage on Soviet television. On 13 April 1990, the forty-seventh anniversary of the discovery of the mass graves, the USSR formally expressed "profound regret" and admitted Soviet secret police responsibility. The day was declared a worldwide Katyn Memorial Day (Polish: Światowy Dzień Pamięci Ofiar Katynia).

== Post-communist investigations ==
In 1990, future Russian president Boris Yeltsin released the top-secret documents from the sealed "Package №1." and transferred them to the new Polish president Lech Wałęsa. Among the documents was a proposal by Beria, dated 5 March 1940, to execute 25,700 Poles from Kozelsk, Ostashkov and Starobelsk camps, and from certain prisons of Western Ukraine and Belarus, signed by Stalin (among others). Another document transferred to the Poles was Shelepin's 3 March 1959 note to Khrushchev, with information about the execution of 21,857 Poles, as well as a proposal to destroy their personal files to reduce the possibility documents related to the massacre would be uncovered later. The revelations were also publicized in the Russian press, where they were interpreted as being one outcome of an ongoing power struggle between Yeltsin and Gorbachev.

=== Criminal prosecution attempts and further testimonies ===
In 1991, the Chief Military Prosecutor for the Soviet Union began proceedings against Pyotr Soprunenko (1908–1992), the above-mentioned former head of the NKVD's Prisoners of War and Internees affairs department, for his role in the Katyn killings. However, he eventually declined to prosecute because Soprunenko, who died a year later, was 83, almost blind, and recovering from a cancer operation.

During his 29 April 1991 interrogation, Soprunenko defended himself by denying his own signature. He further claimed to prosecutors that from late March to late May 1940 he had been in Vyborg and that when he returned to Moscow the prisoners were gone and the NKVD management would not tell him where the Poles had gone, adding that 'in those times it was impossible to ask...'

Further testimonies were publicized in October 1991 via a report made by Nicholas Bethell, a British historian and Conservative member of the European Parliament, who obtained videotaped copies of the interrogations to surviving participants, statements, and met with military prosecutors in Moscow. His report mentioned Soprunenko and Tokarev (1902–1993), named "Vladimir Tokaryev" in Bethell's and other sources. Tokarev, the head of the Kalinin NKVD branch, was 89 but still recalled how 250 Poles were murdered every night in Kalinin.

Earlier in August 1991, Tokarev, who still lived in Miednoje, had reportedly told Colonel Aleksander Tretetsky of the Soviet Prosecutor's Office, the exact location where the Polish remains were. However, Tokarev claimed that he had been "obliged to help them by putting my men at their disposal" and that he had not been in the "execution room."

Moreover, Tokarev, who had given a long deposition to prosecutors on 20 March 1991, emphasized that the Ostashkov camp was centrally controlled by the Moscow NKVD, enjoying a sort of "extra-territoriality" within the oblast. He also claimed that he was not involved in any intervention or activity in said camp or that he even dealt with POWs, despite documents from Soprunenko showing otherwise.

Bethell's report, which was published in The Observer, also quoted Tokarev as saying that he learned of the massacre's plan in March 1940; he was called to a meeting in Moscow with Bogdan Kobulov, Beria's deputy, and claimed that Soprunenko was present in said meeting, in which the latter explained details of the operation. Moreover, Bethell's spoke of Soprunenko telling that he received an order from the Politburo to carry out the executions, signed by Stalin. Bethell also characterized Soprunenko as ″evasive and shifty″ in his deposition, showing little regret for his role.

Bethell also claimed that the investigation had been hampered by the suspension of Maj. Gen. Alexander Katyusev because of his ″inactivity″ during the August coup attempt by hardline elements of the Soviet military and political establishment against Gorbachev. According to Bethell, around 19 August, KGB officers in Tver (formerly Kalinin) attempted to stop the exhumation of Polish graves. Major General Vladimir Kupiets, the leader of the four-man military prosecution team that investigated the massacre, said that ″They told us that our work was unnecessary and that they would not guarantee our safety. Still, we carried on.″

Kupiets further declared that ″The system of NKVD special commissions was completely outside the Soviet constitution. They had no basis in law, even in those days. An execution carried out under their authority was, quite simply, a murder. ″ And while Bethell said that Soviet prosecutors expected to recommend pressing charges against Tokaryev and Soprunenko, Russian law further prevented this due to Soviet doctrine considering that crimes against humanity, which were not universally subject to statute of limitations, were only committed in the name of Nazi Germany. In this line, Bethell suggested back then that "retroactive legislation could be passed, making mass murder of this sort a limitless crime."

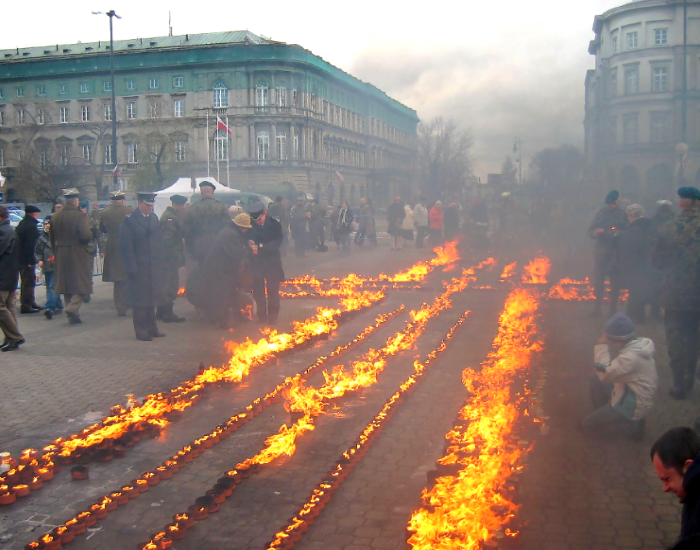
Ceremony commemorating the posthumous promotion of Katyn massacre victims, Piłsudski Square, Warsaw, 10 November 2007

=== Later events ===
During Kwaśniewski's visit to Russia in September 2004, Russian officials announced they were willing to transfer all the information on the Katyn massacre to the Polish authorities as soon as it became declassified. In March 2005 the Prosecutor-General's Office of the Russian Federation concluded a decade-long investigation of the massacre and announced that the investigation was able to confirm the deaths of 1,803 out of 14,542 Polish citizens who had been sentenced to death while in three Soviet camps. He did not address the fate of about 7,000 victims who had not been in POW camps, but in prisons. Savenkov declared the massacre was not a genocide, that Soviet officials who had been found guilty of the crime were dead and that, consequently, "there is absolutely no basis to talk about this in judicial terms". Of the 183 volumes of files gathered during the Russian investigation, 116 were declared to contain state secrets and were classified.

On 22 March 2005, the Polish Sejm unanimously passed an act requesting the Russian archives to be declassified. The Sejm also requested Russia to classify the Katyn massacre as a crime of genocide. The resolution stressed that the authorities of Russia "seek to diminish the burden of this crime by refusing to acknowledge it was genocide and refuse to give access to the records of the investigation into the issue, making it difficult to determine the whole truth about the killing and its perpetrators."

In 2007, a case (Janowiec and Others v. Russia) was brought in front of the European Court of Human Rights, with the families of several victims claiming that Russia violated the European Convention on Human Rights by withholding documents from the public. The court declared admissible two complaints from relatives of the massacre victims against Russia regarding adequacy of the official investigation. In a ruling on 16 April 2012, the court found Russia had violated the rights of victims' relatives by not providing them with sufficient information about the investigation and described the massacre as a "war crime". But it also refused to judge the effectiveness of the Soviet Russian investigation because the related events took place before Russia ratified the Human Rights Convention in 1998. The plaintiffs filed an appeal but a 21 October 2013 ruling essentially reaffirmed the prior one, claiming that the matter is outside the court's competence, and only rebuking the Russian side for its failure to substantiate adequately why some critical information remained classified. In late 2007 and early 2008, several Russian newspapers, including Rossiyskaya Gazeta, Komsomolskaya Pravda, and Nezavisimaya Gazeta, printed stories that implicated the Nazis in the crime, spurring concern, this was done with the tacit approval of the Kremlin. As a result, the Polish Institute of National Remembrance decided to open its own investigation.

In 2008, the Polish Foreign Ministry asked the government of Russia about alleged footage of the massacre filmed by the NKVD during the killings, something the Russians have denied exists. Polish officials believe this footage, as well as further documents showing cooperation of Soviets with the Gestapo during the operations, are the reason for Russia's decision to classify most of the documents about the massacre.

In the following years, many volumes of the case were declassified and transferred to the Polish government, but others remained classified. In June 2008, Russian courts consented to hear a case about the declassification of documents about Katyn and the judicial rehabilitation of the victims.

On 21 April 2010, the Russian Supreme Court ordered the Moscow City Court to hear an appeal in an ongoing Katyn legal case. A civil rights group, Memorial, said the ruling could lead to a court decision to open up secret documents providing details about the killings of thousands of Polish officers. Russia handed over to Poland copies of 137 of the 183 volumes of unclassified material of Russian investigation of the Katyn criminal case. Russian president Dmitry Medvedev handed one of the volumes to the acting Polish president, Bronislaw Komorowski. Medvedev and Komorowski agreed the two states should continue to try to reveal the truth about the tragedy. The Russian president reiterated Russia would continue to declassify documents on the Katyn massacre and ordered to release the documents proving the guilt of Stalin and Beria. In November 2010, the Russian State Duma issued an official declaration that condemned Stalin for the Katyn massacre. Nevertheless, 35 out of 183 files about the Katyn massacre remain classified in Russia.

According to Belarus state archives known as "Belarusian Katyn List", some courts in the Belarusian SSR also issued death sentences to Poles, and there was a list with names of 3,870 officers whose identities and exact place of execution (presumably Bykivnia and Kuropaty) still remain to be established.

== Legacy ==
=== Polish–Russian relations ===
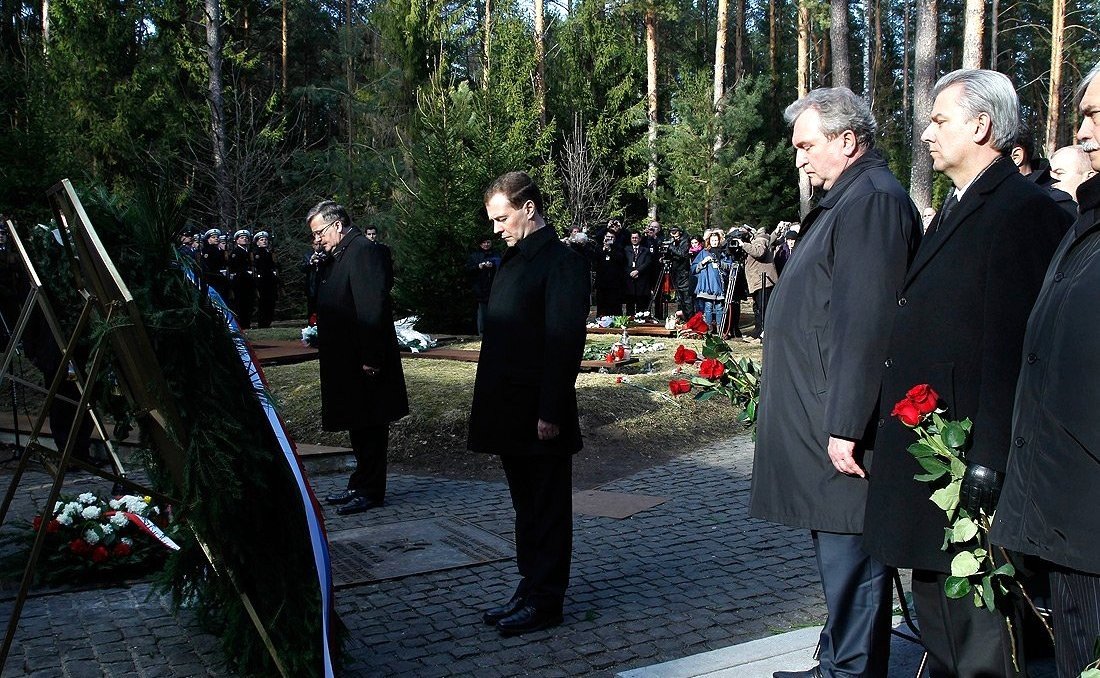
Russian president Dmitry Medvedev and Polish president Bronislaw Komorowski laying wreaths at the Katyn massacre memorial complex, 11 April 2011

Russia and Poland remained divided on the legal description of the Katyn crime. The Poles considered it a case of genocide and demanded further investigations, as well as complete disclosure of Soviet documents.

In June 1998, Boris Yeltsin and Aleksander Kwaśniewski agreed to construct memorial complexes at Katyn and Mednoye, the two NKVD execution sites on Russian soil. In September of that year, the Russians also raised the issue of Soviet prisoner of war deaths in the camps for Russian prisoners and internees in Poland (1919–24). About 16,000 to 20,000 POWs died in those camps due to communicable diseases. Some Russian officials argued it was "a genocide comparable to Katyn". A similar claim was raised in 1994; such attempts are seen by some, particularly in Poland, as a highly provocative Russian attempt to create an "anti-Katyn" and "balance the historical equation". The fate of Polish prisoners and internees in Soviet Russia remains poorly researched.

On 4 February 2010, the prime minister of Russia, Vladimir Putin, invited his Polish counterpart, Donald Tusk, to attend a Katyn memorial service in April. The visit took place on 7 April 2010, when Tusk and Putin together commemorated the 70th anniversary of the massacre. Before the visit, the 2007 film Katyń was shown on Russian state television for the first time. The Moscow Times commented that the film's premiere in Russia was likely a result of Putin's intervention.

On 10 April 2010, an aircraft carrying Polish president Lech Kaczyński with his wife and 87 other politicians and high-ranking army officers crashed in Smolensk, killing all 96 aboard the aircraft. The passengers were to attend a ceremony marking the 70th anniversary of the Katyn massacre. The Polish nation was stunned; Prime Minister Donald Tusk, who was not on the plane, referred to the crash as "the most tragic Polish event since the war." In the aftermath, a number of conspiracy theories began to circulate. The catastrophe has also had major echoes in the international and particularly the Russian press, prompting a rebroadcast of Katyń on Russian television. The Polish president was to deliver a speech at the formal commemorations. The speech was to honour the victims, highlight the significance of the massacres in the context of post-war communist political history, as well as stress the need for Polish–Russian relations to focus on reconciliation. Although the speech was never delivered, it has been published with a narration in the original Polish and a translation has also been made available in English.

In November 2010, the State Duma (lower house of the Russian parliament) passed a resolution declaring long-classified documents "showed that the Katyn crime was carried out on direct orders of Stalin and other Soviet officials". The declaration also called for the massacre to be investigated further to confirm the list of victims. Members of the Duma from the Communist Party denied the Soviet Union had been to blame for the Katyn massacre and voted against the declaration. The release was seen as a significant acknowledgment of Soviet responsibility, although it did not come with a formal state apology. The move followed years of pressure from the Polish government and international human rights organizations. Russia's decision to publish the documents online was widely reported by international media and welcomed in Poland, though some critics noted that parts of the archive remained classified.

=== Those adopting pre-1990 views ===
The Communist Party of the Russian Federation and a number of other pro-Soviet Russian politicians and commentators claim that the story of Soviet guilt is a conspiracy and that the documents released in 1990 were forgeries. They insist that the original version of events, assigning guilt to the Nazis, is the correct version, and they call on the Russian government to start a new investigation that would revise the findings of 2004.

These alternative versions were refuted by a number of Russian historians and organizations such as Memorial. They pointed to inconsistencies in this alternative version, namely the details of another contemporary mass execution site at Mednoye in the Tver Region. That part of Central Russia, they stress, was never under German occupation and yet it contained the remains of victims originating from the same camps as those killed in Katyn; the victims at Mednoye were also killed in April–May 1940. Mednoye was only examined in the 1990s and was found to contain well-preserved Polish uniforms, documents, souvenirs, and Soviet newspapers dating back to 1940.

In September 2009, Yevgeny Dzhugashvili, Stalin's grandson, sued Russian opposition newspaper Novaya Gazeta after it published an article claiming his grandfather personally signed execution orders against civilians. Dzhugashvili centered his case on the veracity of a document showing Stalin ordered the Katyn massacre. On 13 October 2009, the Russian court rejected the suit.

In 2021, the Russian Ministry of Culture downgraded the memorial complex at Katyn on its Register of Sites of Cultural Heritage from a place of federal to one of only regional importance.

==== Post 2022 invasion of Ukraine ====
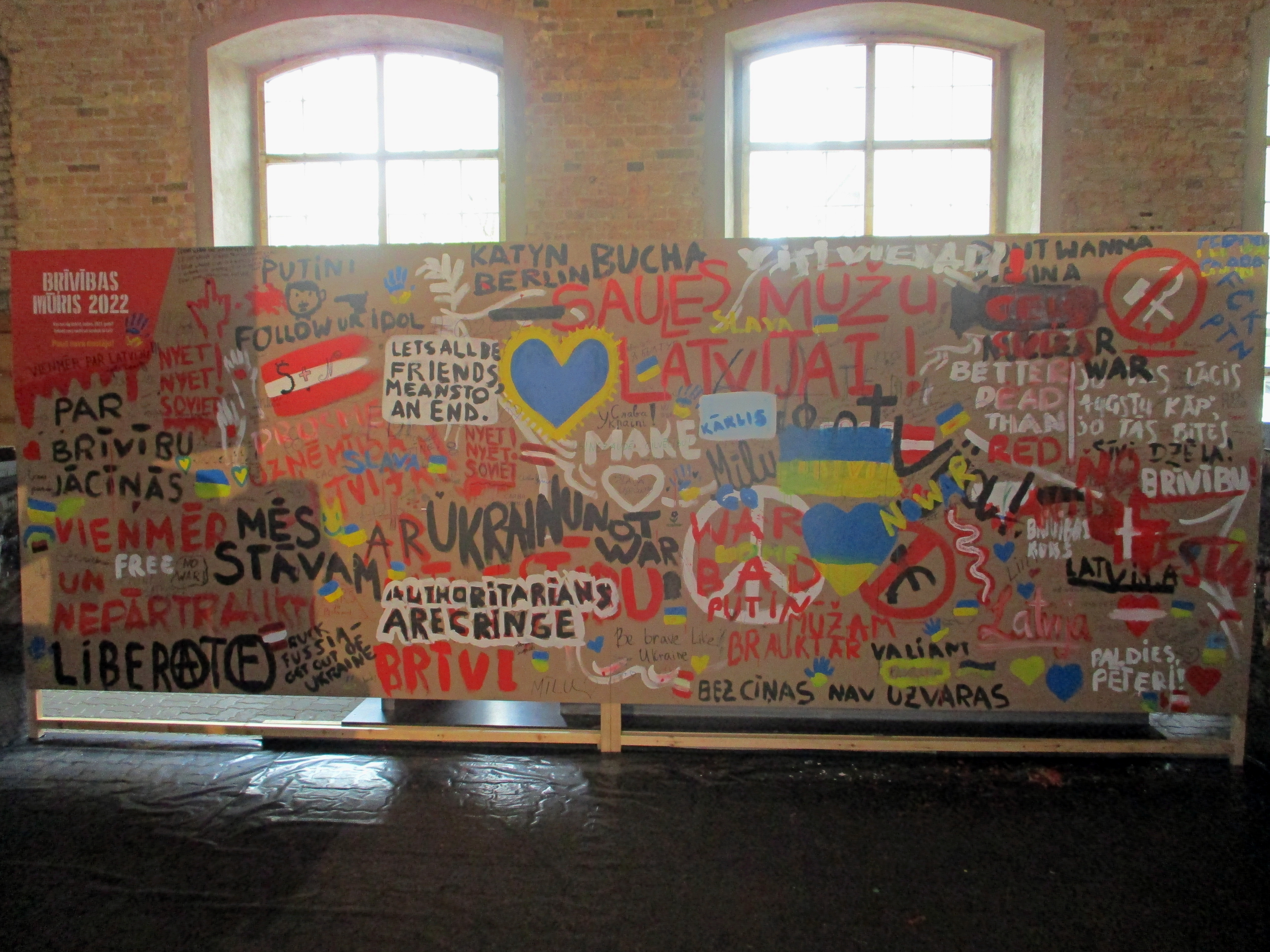
"Nyet, nyet, Soviet" memorial containing words: "Putin = Hitler", "Katyn = Bucha"

On 10 April 2022, in response to Polish authorities demolishing or removing "Soviet occupation monuments", pro-government activists in support of the invasion parked heavy machinery with flags of the Russian Federation and the letter Z outside the Katyn Memorial Cemetery, which was interpreted as an act of intimidation. This was denied by the organizers, who stated they wished to draw attention to the "Russophobic Polish authorities". A number of Russian politicians advocated demolishing the Polish part of the memorial complex. Among them were State Duma deputies Anatoly Wasserman and Alexey Chepa. On 28 June 2022 the Leningradsky Court of Kaliningrad forbade distribution of the book "Katyn. On the trail of a crime". According to the court the book "rehabilitated Nazism" and "violated the law on glorifying Soviet Victory in the Great Patriotic War".

In June 2022, Russia removed the Polish flag from the memorial complex, amidst a rise in Russia–Poland political tension due to the Russian invasion of Ukraine. In April 2023 Russia ordered all Polish flags to be removed from the site before the commemoration on 20 April.

On 11 April 2023, RIA Novosti, Russian state-owned domestic news agency, reported that FSB Department for St. Petersburg and the Leningrad Region handed over "unique archival documents" on Katyn to the Central State Archive of St. Petersburg - including testimony of a German soldier, claiming that he took part in Katyn Massacre burials in early September 1941. RIA article further reported how according to "a number of Russian historians, the executions in Katyn were carried out by the Nazis", that there are "inconsistencies in the evidence base on which Warsaw relies" and that the Russian Federation finds the "current approach to covering the "Katyn case" does not meet the principles of objectivity and historicism" and that it is just a part of "information and propaganda campaign" to blame the "USSR for unleashing World War II."

=== Memorials ===
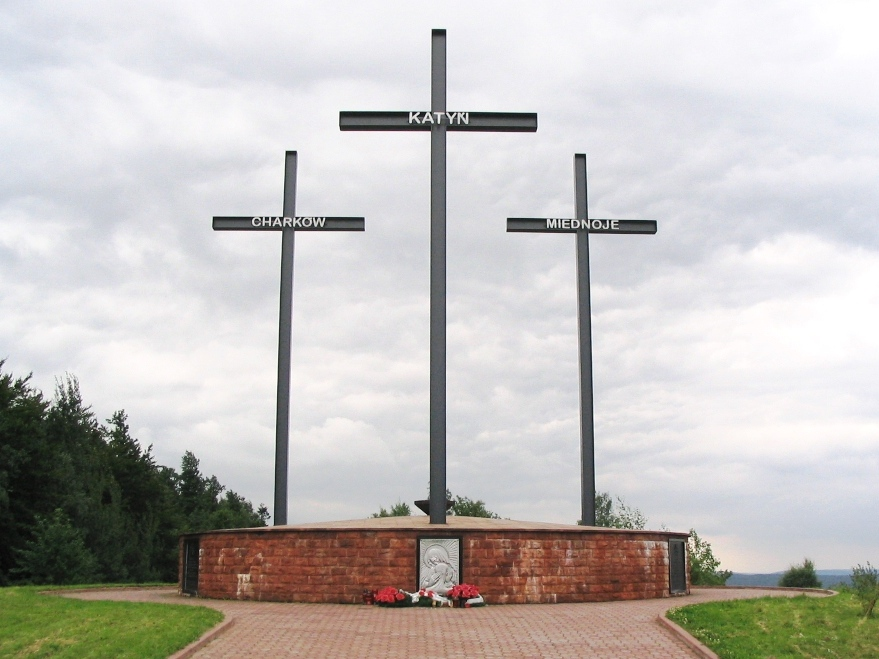
Katyn-Kharkov-Mednoye memorial in the Świętokrzyskie Mountains, Poland

Many monuments and memorials that commemorate the massacre have been erected worldwide, including Katyn war cemetery in Katyn, National Katyń Memorial in Baltimore, Maryland, and several memorials in the UK.

== See also ==
- Fântâna Albă massacre
- The Forgotten Holocaust
- History of Poland (1939–1945)
- The Last Witness
- List of mass graves from Soviet mass executions
- Massacres in Piaśnica
- Occupation of Poland (1939–1945)
- Polish Operation of the NKVD
- Smolensk air disaster
- Soviet atrocities committed against prisoners of war during World War II
- Władysław Langner
