= Donald B. Stewart =

American soldier (1915-1983)

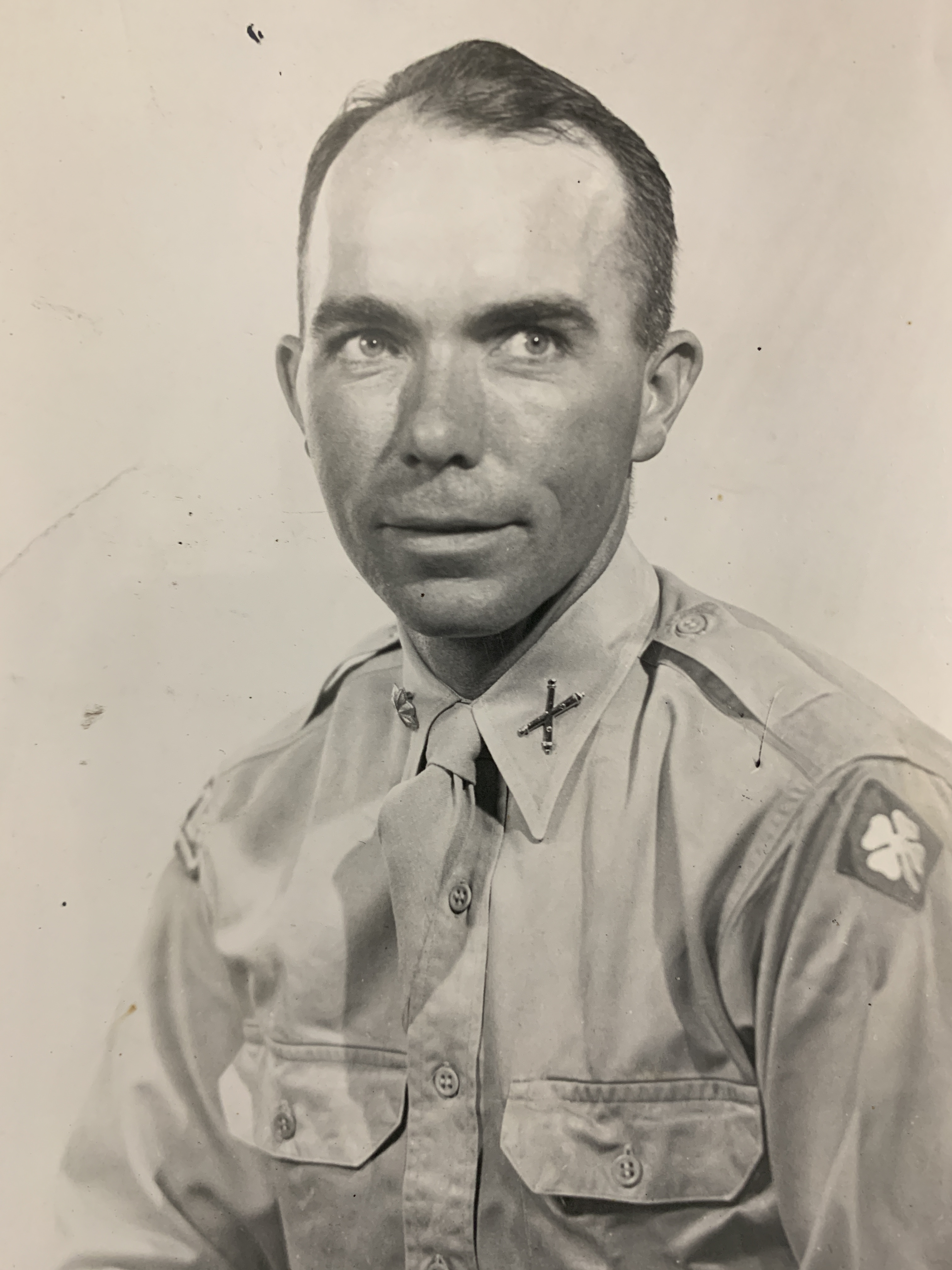
- Stewart circa 1948
- Born: March 17, 1915; Detroit, Michigan
- Died: May 8, 1983 (aged 68); San Antonio, Texas
- Occupation: United States Army
- Spouse: Mary Louise Hoch Stewart
- Children: Monica M. Stewart Bishara, Robert D. Stewart, David A. Stewart, Mary K. Stewart Herrera, and Barbara A. Stewart

Donald Boyle Stewart (March 17, 1915 – May 8, 1983) was a career United States Army officer. He graduated from the United States Military Academy in 1940, fought in North Africa with II Corps (United States), and was captured during the Battle of Sidi Bou Zid on Valentine's Day February 14, 1943. While a captive of the Germans, Stewart and fellow POW Lieutenant Colonel John H. Van Vliet Jr. were selected to attend the Katyn Commission investigation into the Polish officers found murdered in the Katyn Forest near Smolensk, Russia. Stewart and Van Vliet Jr were U.S. Registered Code Users who sent coded messages from Oflag 64 to MIS-X in Fort Hunt New Jersey which identified the Soviets as the perpetrators of the massacre. After their liberation, they testified before the United States House Select Committee to Conduct an Investigation of the Facts, Evidence, and Circumstances of the Katyn Forest Massacre about their experiences at the Katyn Commission exhumations.

== Biography ==
=== Early life ===
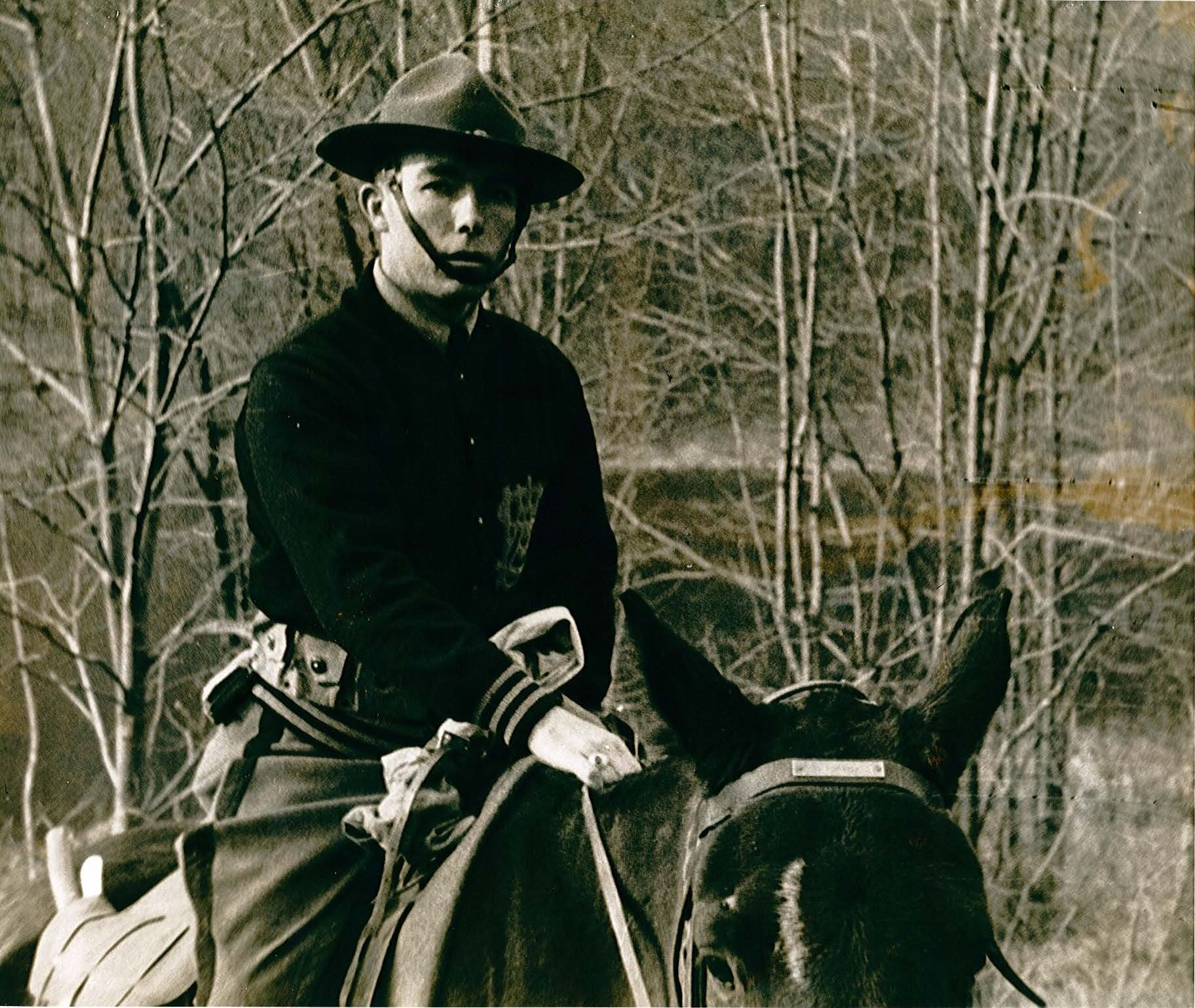
Stewart at U.S.M.A. in 1938

Stewart was born on March 17, 1915, in Detroit, Michigan. He graduated from Cooley High School in early 1931, and attended Wayne State University. He joined the U.S. Army as an enlisted man in 1934 and was enrolled in the West Point Preparatory School at Fort McPherson located in Atlanta, Georgia. After being nominated by Michigan Congressional George Anthony Dondero, Stewart entered The United States Military Academy located in West Point, New York, in 1936, and graduated on June 10, 1940, with a commission as a Second Lieutenant in the Artillery. His interests while a cadet at West Point were photography and marksmanship. He was an active member of the West Point Camera, Pistol and Rifle Clubs, qualifying as an expert marksman with both the pistol and the rifle.

=== During World War II ===
After graduating from the U.S.M.A. in 1940, Stewart was assigned as the commanding officer of Battery "B" of the 2nd Battalion of the 17th Field Artillery (2nd/17th FA). After training in the Carolinas, the 2nd/17th FA was deployed to England in 1942 where it received further training before participating in Operation Torch assigned to II Corps in North Africa in late 1942.

On February 14, 1943, Lieutenant General Heinz Ziegler launched Unternehmen Frühlingswind (Operation Spring Breeze) which started with the Battle of Sidi Bou Zid. Located in an extremely forward position behind a small hill north of Garet Hadid near Sidi Bou Zid, Tunisia, Stewart's Battery "B" 2nd/17th FA unit was attacked by Junkers Ju 87 Stuka Dive Bombers at 06:30 am and was overrun by the 21st Panzer Division (Wehrmacht) at 07:30 am. Stewart's 155 man FA unit suffered 30 men killed in action and 60 wounded, with only 7 men later escaping to American lines.

By the time Unternehmen Frühlingswind ended with the Battle of Kasserine Pass, II Corps had suffered over 300 men killed in action, 3,000 wounded, and over 4,000 men captured or missing in action. Stewart was grouped with other captured U.S. Army officers, moved to Sfax and Tunis, and flown to Naples, Italy where he was interned at P.G. (Prigione di Guerra) 66 in Capua. On March 15, 1943, he was moved to Oflag IX/AZ in Rotenburg an der Fulda.

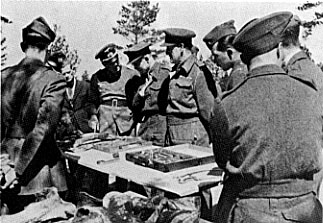
Stewart (third from right) viewing the autopsy table at the Katyn exhumations on 11 May 1943.

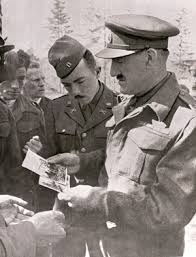
Stewart (second from right) reviews exhumed documents at Katyn.

After the April 11, 1943, announcement of the discovery of the mass graves in the Katyn Forest, Stewart was selected with two other Oflag IX/AZ POWs, Lieutenant Colonel Frank Parker Stevenson and Van Vliet Jr, to attend the International Katyn Commission exhumations in the Katyn Forest. They departed Oflag IX/AZ on May 9, 1943, and arrived in Smolensk, Russia on May 12, 1943, with a British civilian internee Frank Stroobant, British doctor Captain Stanley Gilder, and two British other ranks. The Allied POWs attended the International Katyn Commission activities on May 13, 1943, viewing many exhibits and witnessing an autopsy. After their visit to the Katyn Forest, Stewart and Van Vliet Jr returned to Berlin, Germany, and shortly thereafter to Oflag IX/AZ. Stewart returned to his former assigned barracks with the documents that the Germans had given him at the Katyn exhumations but, less than two months later, he was relocated by the Germans with the rest of the American officer POWs to a new POW camp.

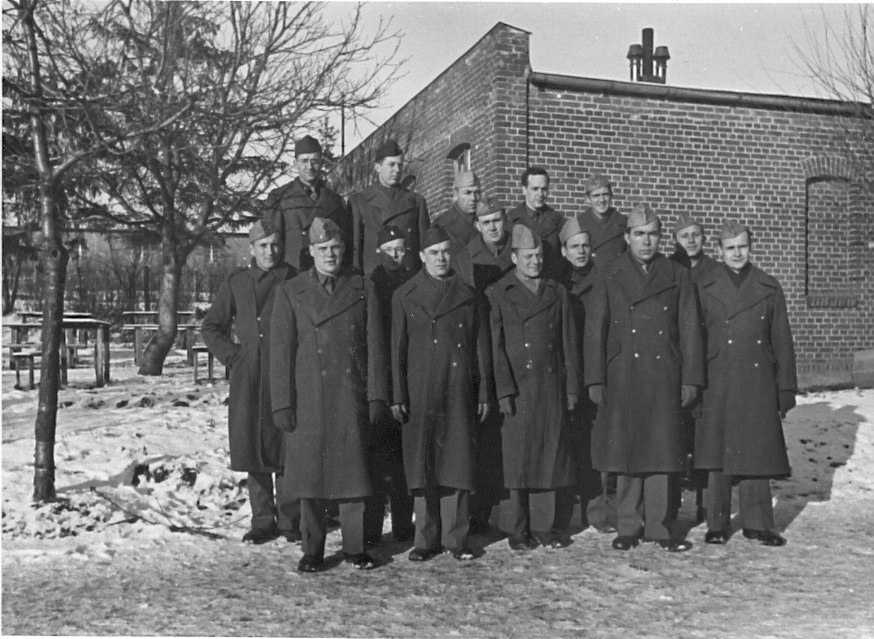
Stewart (front row, second from right) with his captured 2nd/17th FA officers in Oflag 64 during 1944.

Stewart and Van Vliet Jr were transferred to Oflag 64 in Schubin (now Szubin), Poland in June 1943 where they became integral members of the ultra secret MIS-X escape and intelligence gathering network. In July 1943, they sent a coded message back to MIS-X in Fort Hunt which informed U.S. Military Intelligence in Washington, D.C., that in their opinion the Soviets had murdered the Polish officers found in the mass graves in the Katyn Forest. When Stewart was queried by MIS-X on March 10, 1944, to "SEND YOUR JUDGEMENT ON KATYN", both Stewart and Van Vliet Jr responded on April 9, 1944, clearly reaffirming that they believed that the Soviets murdered the Polish officers found in the mass graves in the Katyn Forest. After WWII, Stewart received the Bronze Star with a "V" for Valor for the various roles that he performed while he was a POW for the Oflag 64 MIS-X counterintelligence and escape organization. While at Oflag 64, he served as both a MIS-X Code Writer and as the officer-in-charge of concealing MIS-X escape aids which had been smuggled into Oflag 64 in regular POW food parcels and ultra-secret "hot boxes".

With the Red Army approaching Schubin from the east, the Germans evacuated nearly 1,350 POWs from Oflag 64 on foot on January 21, 1945. Stewart and Van Vliet Jr were a part of this column until February 15, 1945, when Stewart and Van Vliet Jr split up, each keeping possession of the docouments given to them by the Germans while at Katyn. Stewart remained with the Oflag 64 POW column marching to Oflag XIII-B near Hammelburg, Germany while Van Vliet Jr took charge of the injured POWs being shipped by rail to Stalag III-A in Luckenwalde, Germany. On April 4, 1945, Stewart departed Stalag XIII-D and resumed the forced march with Column #5, heading toward Stalag VII-A in Moosburg, Germany where he was liberated on April 29, 1945.

After his liberation and while at Camp Lucky Strike in Le Havre, France, Stewart was informed that Van Vliet Jr had gone to Paris to make a report which later became known as the Van Vliet Paris Report. Van Vliet Jr then traveled to Washington, D.C., where he reported to General Clayton Lawrence Bissell on May 22, 1945, and dictated an oral statement about his visit to the Katyn Forest. The completed transcribed testimony later became known as the 1945 Van Vliet Report and was immediately lost. Bissell issued a written order instructing Van Vliet Jr which stated "it is directed that you neither mention nor discuss this matter with anyone in or out of the service without specific approval in writing from the War Department". When Van Vliet Jr informed Stewart of Bissell's written instructions, Stewart abided by the order as well.

=== After World War II ===
After WWII, Stewart remained silent about his 1943 visit to the Katyn Forest. Congressional members began taking an interest into the Katyn massacre during the late 1940s. On April 26, 1950, Van Vliet Jr was ordered by Major General Floyd L. Parks to recreate the missing 1945 Van Vliet Report. Van Vliet Jr complied and wrote a 6 page report dated May 11, 1950 which later became known as the 1950 Van Vliet Report.

On September 10, 1950, Stewart responded to a communication from the Secretary of the Army inquiring about any MIS-X code messages which had been sent from Oflag 64 to U.S. Military Intelligence. This resulted in Stewart turning over his remaining 1943 Katyn related documents, photos of his visit to the Katyn mass graves, and his April 9, 1944, coded letter to MIS-X to the Secretary of the Army.

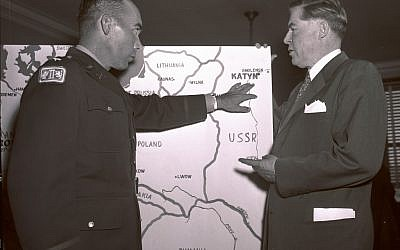
Stewart (left) showing Madden where the Polish officers' mass graves were located in the Katyn Forest.

On October 11, 1951, Stewart was the first person called to testify before the United States House Select Committee to Conduct an Investigation of the Facts, Evidence, and Circumstances of the Katyn Forest Massacre which included Michigan Congressman Dondero. His testimony lasted 2 hours and 35 minutes, and he provided the House committee detailed descriptions of his selection by the Germans to attend the International Katyn Commission's Katyn Forest exhumations, the photos which he brought back from the exhumations, and his personal observations while he was in the Katyn Forest. Stewart's testimony before the House committee was followed by Van Vliet Jr's February 4, 1952, testimony. In neither of their open testimonies before the House committee did Stewart or Van Vliet Jr ever mention that they had sent coded messages to MIS-X while still a POW in Oflag 64 about their convictions of the Soviet guilt for the Katyn massacre. Both men continued to respect Bissell's nondisclosure instructions until Van Vliet Jr was released from Bissell's instructions in 1962 and Stewart was released in 1968 after his retirement from the U.S. Army.

Stewart returned to St. Mary's University and received his teaching degree. He taught mathematics at Central Catholic Marianist High School from 1969 to 1978.

On the 30th anniversary of the Katyn massacre in 1970, Stewart gave a speech before the Polish American Congress in Chicago, Illinois. He spoke before an audience of approximately 3,000 people. Excerpts from Stewart's Chicago speech were later broadcast in Polish by the Voice of America to Poland on 15 May 1970.

In 1980, Roy L. Towers interviewed Stewart and Van Vliet Jr and produced a documentary for a Master's degree thesis in History. Towers' thesis was entitled The Case of the Missing Officers: The Katyn Forest Massacre, and contains the only known video interviews that Stewart and Van Vliet Jr gave about the Katyn massacre. It was released in June 1984, a year after Stewart's death.

In an April 8, 2015, ceremony held in Warsaw, Poland 75 years after the announcement of the discovery of the graves in the Katyn Forest, President Bronisław Komorowski posthumously awarded Stewart and Van Vliet Jr the Officers Cross of the Order of Merit of the Republic of Poland. They are the only two U.S. Army officers to have received this medal.

On April 11, 2015, a monument honoring Stewart and Van Vliet Jr was unveiled at the former Oflag 64 site in Szubin Poland. The monument acknowledged the code letters that Stewart and Van Vliet Jr sent to U.S. Military Intelligence in 1943 and 1944 which stated that they believed the Soviets murdered the Polish officers who were found in the Katyn Forest.

=== Marriage and children ===
After he completed United States Army Command and General Staff College in Fort Leavenworth, Kansas in 1947, Stewart was assigned as the military instructor in charge of the St. Mary's University, Texas, on campus Reserve Officers' Training Corps program. When he reported to the United States Army North headquarters located at Fort Sam Houston in San Antonio, Texas, headquarters staff officer Colonel Louis Anthony Hoch invited Stewart to a home-cooked dinner where he met his future wife, Mary Louise Hoch.

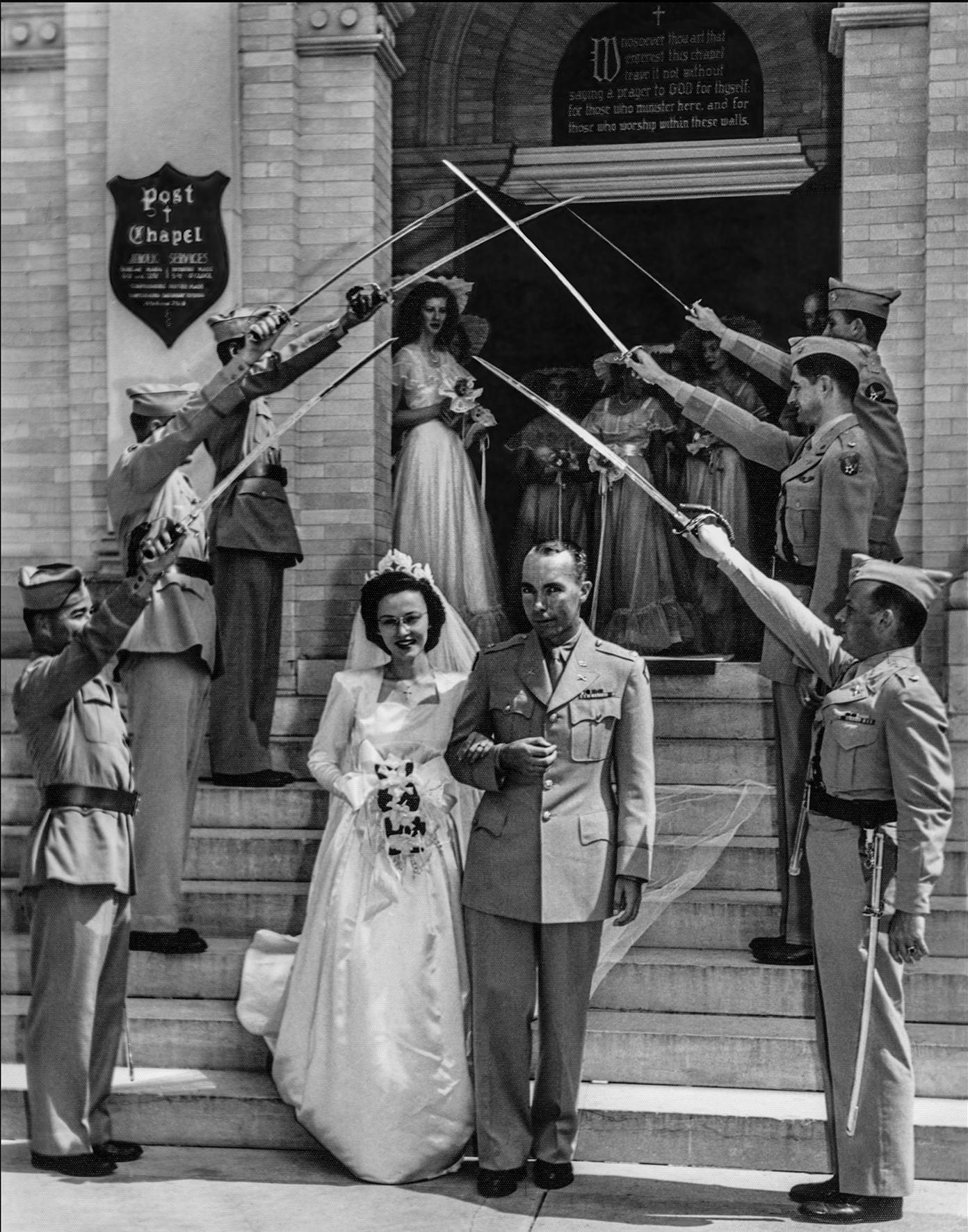
Major Stewart wedding at Fort Sam Houston, Texas.

After a short courtship, they were married on May 30, 1948, and remained married for over 35 years until his death in 1983. They had five children:

- Monica Mary Stewart Bishara, High School art and French teacher, and award-winning watercolor artist.
- Robert Donald Stewart, geophysicist.
- David Anthony Stewart, TCEQ licensed water/wastewater plant operator, HDPE pipe installation expert/consultant, and author.
- Mary Kathleen Stewart Herrera, ECE/ESL elementary educator.
- Barbara Anne Stewart, director of information technology.

With the exception of a two-year tour in South Korea, the family stayed together as a unit and traveled to various military bases in both Europe and the United States as his U.S. Army postings changed until his retirement in 1968. Stewart has seven grandchildren and eight great-grandchildren.

=== Death ===
While Stewart dealt with life-long detrimental effects to his health due to the 1,200-calories-per-day starvation diet which he endured while a POW at Oflag 64, he fought several cancers in the late 1970s which ultimately took his life on May 8, 1983. He was buried with full military honors in the Fort Sam Houston National Cemetery in San Antonio, Texas.

== Recognition ==

1st Row	Silver Star Medal		
2nd Row	Bronze Star Medal with one "V" for Valor	Army Commendation Medal	POW Medal
3rd Row	American Defense Service Medal	American Campaign Medal	European-African-Middle Eastern Campaign Medal with two Battle Stars
4th Row	World War II Victory Medal	Army of Occupation Medal	National Defense Service Medal

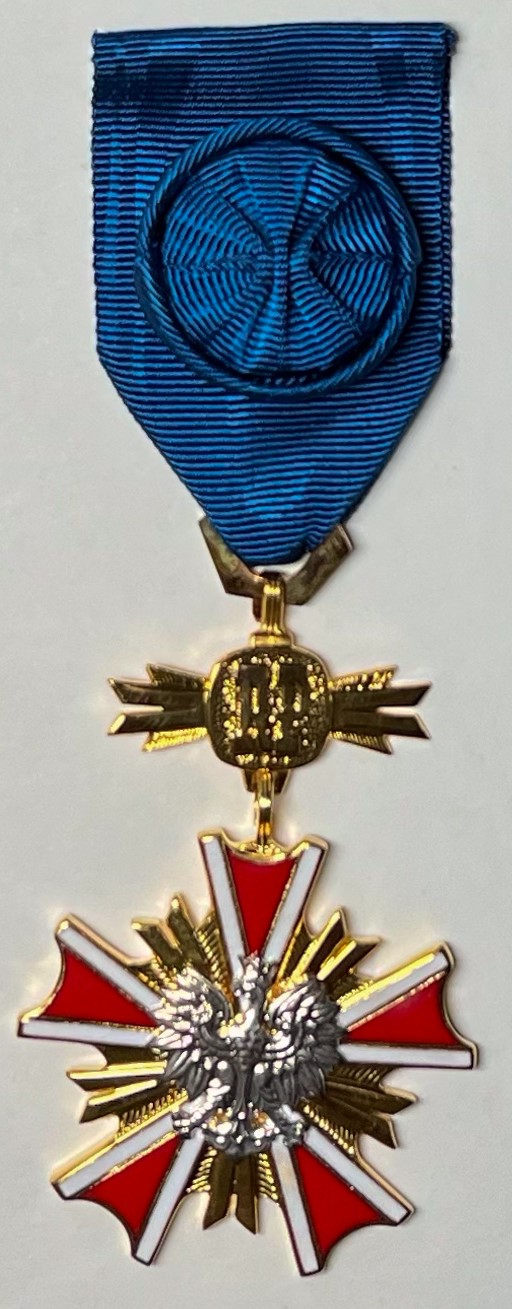
Officers Cross of the Order of Merit of the Republic of Poland

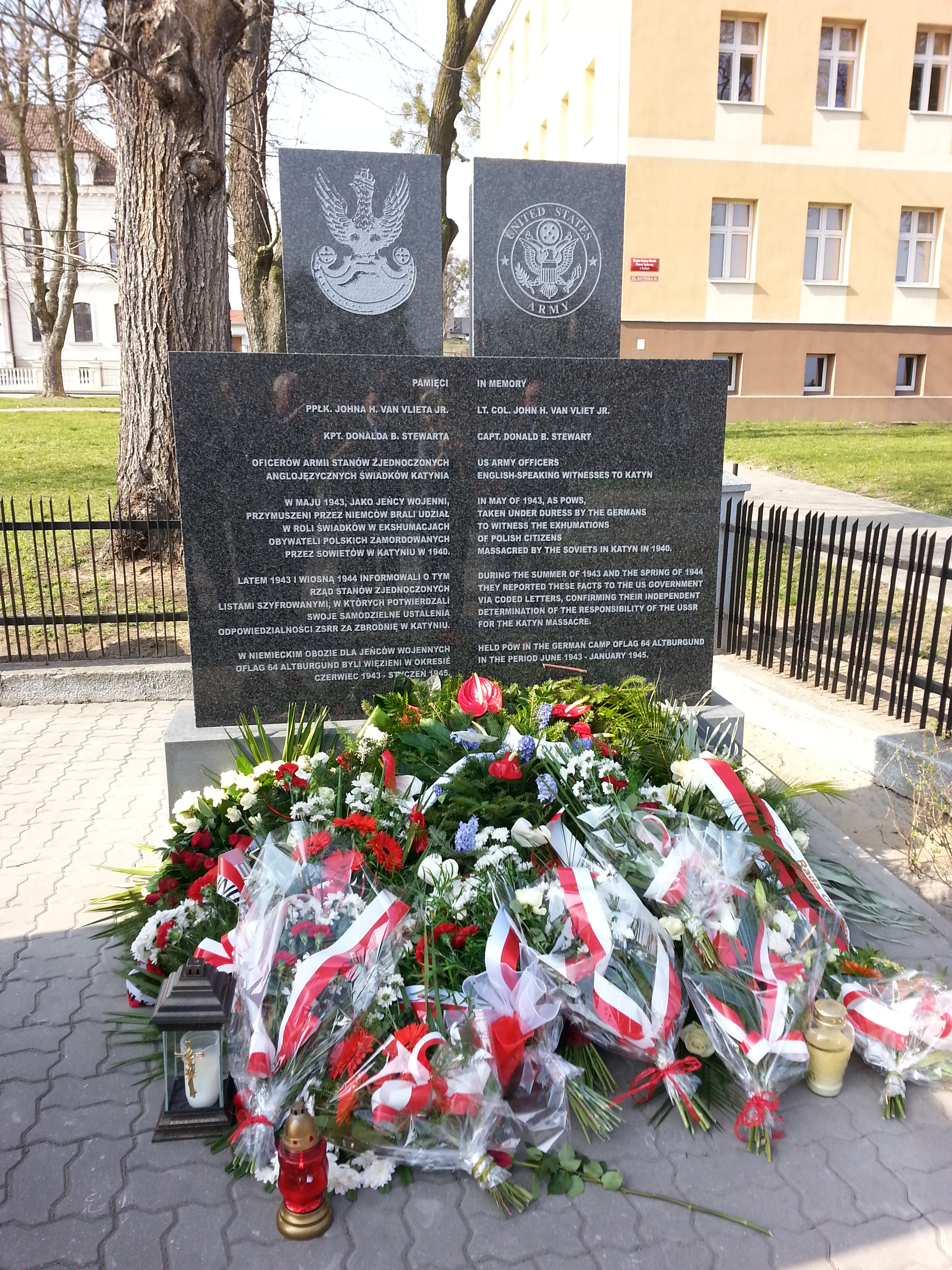
Memorial for Stewart and Van Vliet Jr at the former site of the Oflag 64 POW camp in Szubin, Poland.

== Media ==
- Im Wald von Katyn (Katyn Commission investigation film, produced by the government of Nazi Germany, 1943 - the Allied POW party with Stewart & Van Vliet Jr can be seen at the 7:08 mark)
- Video on YouTube The Case of the Missing Officers: The Katyn Forest Massacre (Roy L. Towers, Jr., 1985)
- Video on YouTube Oflag 64: A POW Odyssey (PBS, 2000)

== See also ==
- John H. Van Vliet Jr.
- Katyn (rural locality)
- Katyń
- Katyń Museum
