= John H. Van Vliet Jr. =

American army officer (1914–2000)

John H. Van Vliet Jr
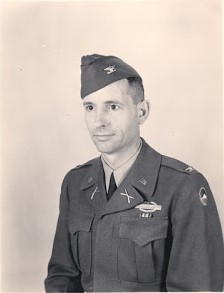
- Van Vliet circa 1952
- Born: November 9, 1914; Texas City, Texas
- Died: February 5, 2000 (aged 85); Sandy Springs, Georgia
- Occupation: United States Army
- Spouse: Miriam Samelson
- Children: Jacqueline, Susan, Sara, and John H. Van Vliet III

John Huff Van Vliet Jr. (November 9, 1914 – February 5, 2000) was a career United States Army officer. He graduated from the United States Military Academy (U.S.M.A.) in 1937, fought in North Africa with II Corps (United States), and was captured during the Battle of Sidi Bou Zid on February 17, 1943. While a captive of the Germans, Van Vliet and fellow POW Captain Donald B. Stewart and Lt Col Stevenson (South African Reserve Army) were selected to attend the Katyn Commission investigation into the Polish officers found murdered in the Katyn Forest near Smolensk, Russia. Van Vliet and Stewart were U.S. Registered Code Users who sent coded messages from Oflag 64 to MIS-X in Fort Hunt New Jersey which identified the Soviets as the perpetrators of the massacre. After their liberation, they testified before the United States House Select Committee to Conduct an Investigation of the Facts, Evidence, and Circumstances of the Katyn Forest Massacre about their experiences at the Katyn Commission exhumations.

== Early life and education ==
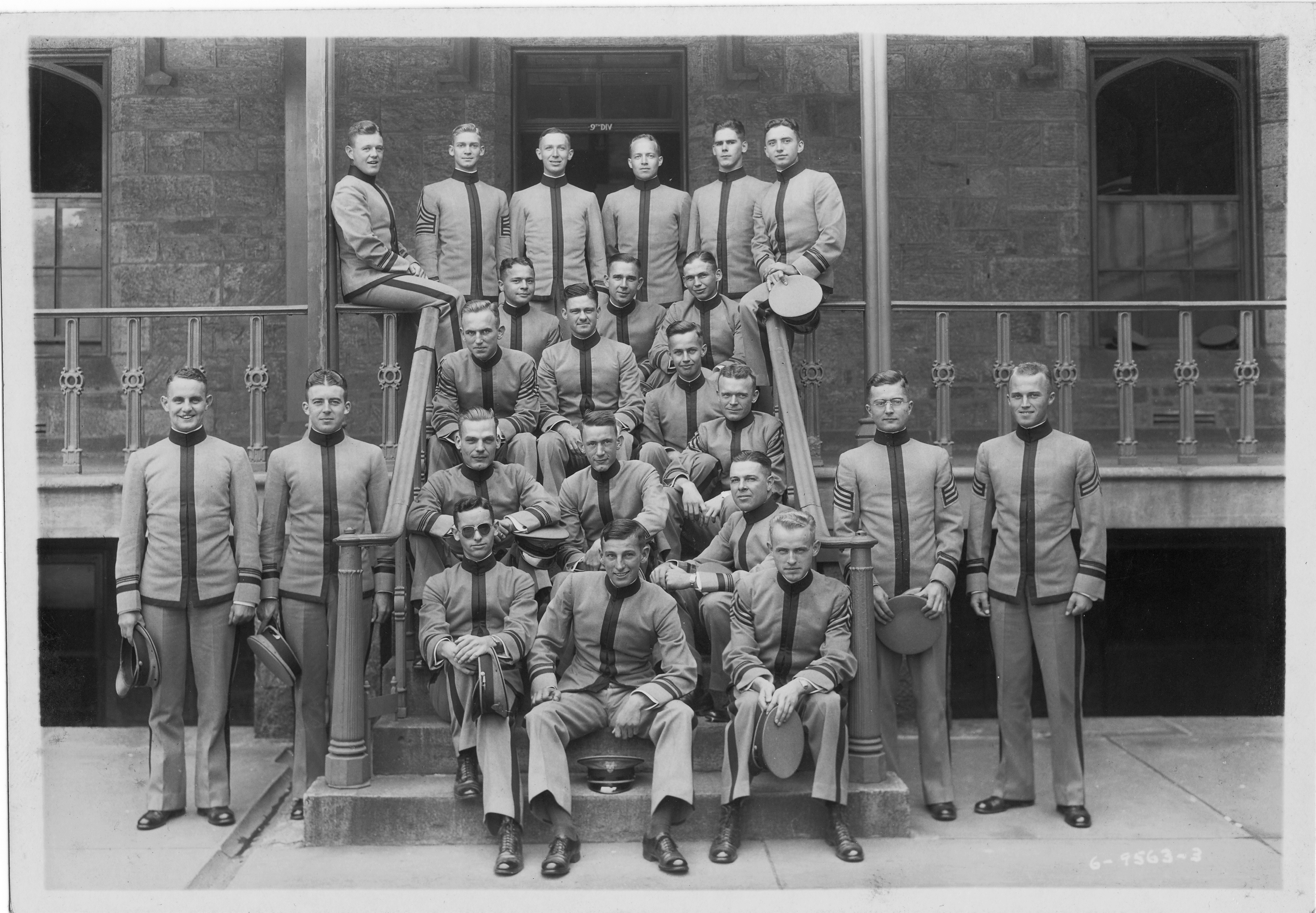
Van Vliet Jr at the U.S.M.A. in 1937 (front row on the left wearing sun glasses)

John Huff Van Vliet Jr was born into a military family on November 9, 1914. His father, Colonel John H. Van Vliet Sr, graduated from the U.S.M.A. in 1913.

An "Army brat", Van Vliet lived in multiple places including China, the Philippines, and even at West Point during the time his father was an instructor at USMA. He was graduated from Wentworth Military Academy and was appointed to the US Military Academy Class of 1937 with a Senatorial Appointment from Kansas. As a cadet, he was a member of the track team, the swimming team and the Protestant Chapel Choir.

== Career ==
After graduation and commissioning as a Second Lieutenant of Infantry, Van Vliet served at Fort Washington MD, and then with the 27th Infantry Regiment in Hawaii.

=== World War II ===
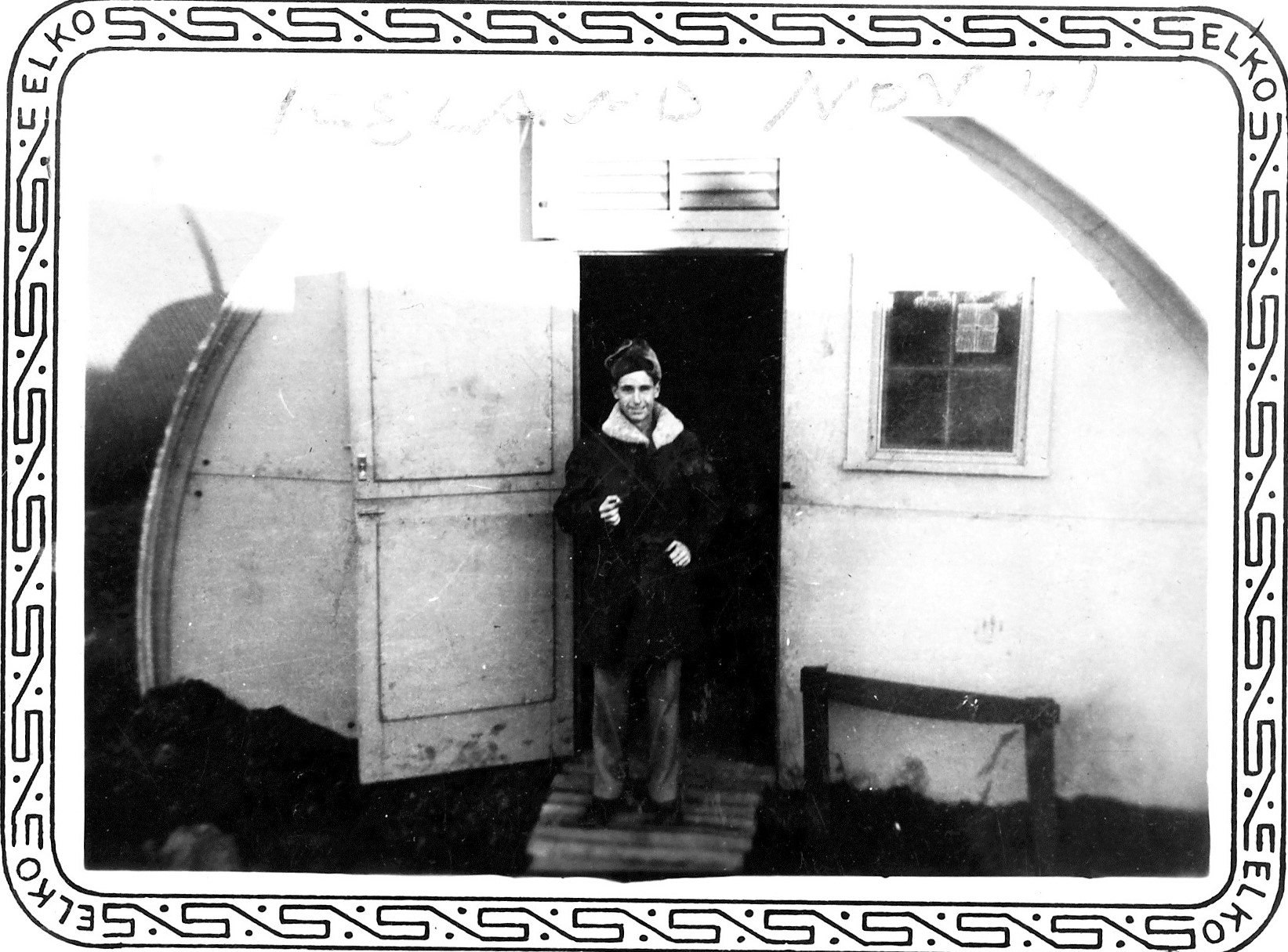
Van Vliet Jr in Iceland during 1941

In September 1941, Van Vliet was ordered to go to the United Kingdom (UK) in civilian clothes where he observed the British Army and took specialized British Army courses. He briefly returned to Fort Benning as an instructor at the Infantry School before traveling again to the UK to take command of the 3rd Battalion of the 168th Infantry Regiment (United States) (3/168th Infantry) and lead it during the Operation Torch invasion of North Africa. The 3rd/168th Infantry was a part of the Iowa National Guard which had been assigned to the 34th Infantry Division (United States) and was a component of II Corps (United States) during the 1942-43 battle for North Africa.

On February 14, 1943, Lieutenant General Heinz Ziegler launched Unternehmen Frühlingswind (Operation Spring Breeze) which started with the Battle of Sidi Bou Zid and ended with the Battle of Kasserine Pass in eastern Tunisia. Van Vliet Jr's battalion, which had been assigned to defend DJebel Ksaira, which was located between Faid Pass and Sidi Bou Zid, was surrounded on the first day of the battle. On February 16, a light aircraft dropped a message instructing the Americans to abandon DJebel Ksaira and rejoin Allied lines at Djebel Hamia 42 miles to the west. At dawn on the morning of February 17, a German armored unit surrounded Van Vliet Jr's 3rd/168th Infantry unit. A short battle ensued which resulted in the capture of approximately 800 of the 960 men in Van Vliet Jr's Battalion.

By the time Unternehmen Frühlingswind ended with the Battle of Kasserine Pass, II Corps had suffered over 300 men killed in action, 3,000 wounded, and over 4,000 men captured or missing in action. Van Vliet was grouped with other captured U.S. Army officers, moved to Sfax and Tunis, and flown to Naples, Italy where he was interned at P.G. (Prigione di Guerra) 66 in Capua. On March 15, 1943, he was moved to Oflag IX/AZ in Rotenburg an der Fulda.

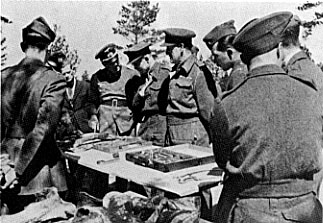
Van Vliet Jr (on far left) viewing the autopsy table at the Katyn exhumations on 11 May 1943

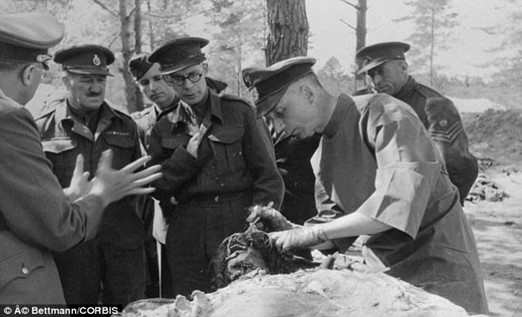
Van Vliet Jr (third from left in garrison hat) viewing an autopsy in the Katyn Forest

After the April 11, 1943 announcement of the discovery of the mass graves in the Katyn Forest, Van Vliet was selected at Oflag IX/AZ along with Stewart and Lieutenant Colonel Frank Parker Stevenson to attend the International Katyn Commission exhumations in the Katyn Forest. They departed Oflag IX/AZ on May 9, 1943 and arrived in Smolensk, Russia on May 12, 1943 with a British civilian internee Frank Stroobant, British doctor Captain Stanley Gilder, and two British other ranks. The Allied POWs attended the International Katyn Commission activities on May 13, 1943, viewing many exhibits and witnessing an autopsy. After their visit to the Katyn Forest, Van Vliet and Stewart returned to Berlin, Germany, and shortly thereafter to Oflag IX/AZ. Van Vliet faked an illness so he could be hospitalized and thus able to participate in his first escape attempt but the Germans discovered the tunnel and the escape attempt failed.

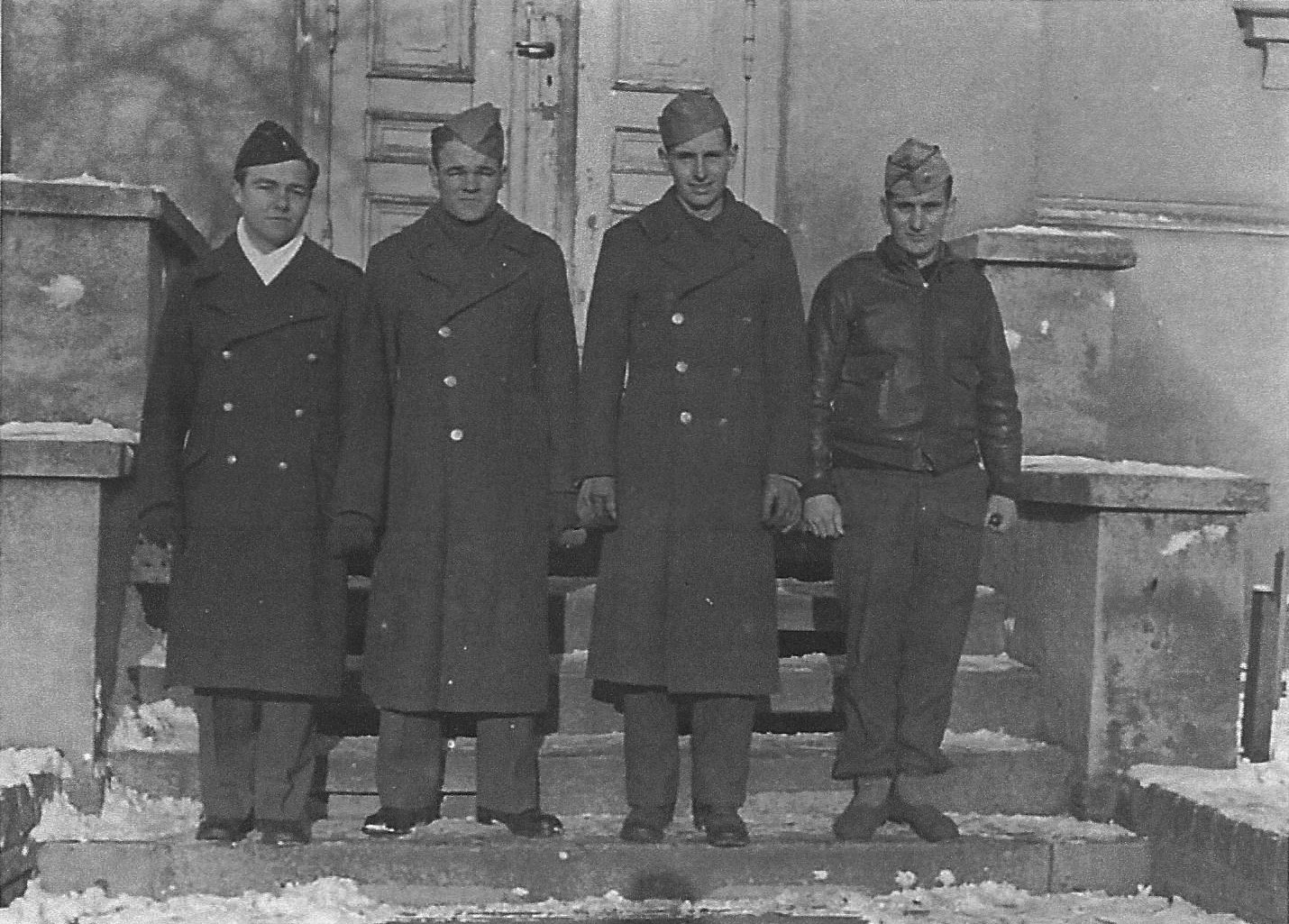
Van Vliet Jr (second from right) with the other "Escape Artists"

Van Vliet and Stewart were transferred to Oflag 64 in Schubin (now Szubin), Poland in June 1943 where they became integral members of the ultra secret MIS-X escape and intelligence gathering network. Van Vliet assumed the role of "Big X" and was placed in charge of coordinating and approving any escape attempts. He participated in three failed escape attempts with three other POWs while at Oflag 64, The four POWs, Van Vliet Jr, 2LT William F. Higgins, 1LT Roy J. Chappell Jr, and 2LT Frank Newell Aten, were fondly referred to as "Escape Artists" by their fellow POWs. In July 1943, Van Vliet and Stewart sent a coded message back to MIS-X in Fort Hunt which informed U.S. Military Intelligence in Washington D.C. that the Soviets had murdered the Polish officers found in the mass graves in the Katyn Forest. When Stewart was queried by MIS-X on March 10, 1944 to "SEND YOUR JUDGEMENT ON KATYN", both Van Vliet and Stewart responded on April 9, 1944 clearly reaffirming that they believed that the Soviets murdered the Polish officers found in the mass graves in the Katyn Forest.

With the Red Army approaching Schubin from the east, the Germans evacuated nearly 1,350 POWs from Oflag 64 on foot on January 21, 1945. Van Vliet and Stewart were a part of this column until February 15, 1945 when Van Vliet and Stewart split up, each keeping possession of the docouments given to them by the Germans while at Katyn. Van Vliet took charge of the injured POWs being shipped by rail to Stalag III-A in Luckenwalde, Germany while Stewart remained with the Oflag 64 POW column marching to Oflag XIII-B near Hammelburg, Germany. On ??? April 1945, Van Vliet escaped from Stalag III-A and reached American lines on 5 May 1945 still in possession of his 1943 Katyn exhumation photos and signed travel orders to the Katyn Forest. On 6 May 1945, Van Vliet spoke with General “Lightning Joe” J. Lawton Collins, Commanding General of Seventh Corps, who was a longtime friend of the Van Vliet family, and made his first official non-MIS-X Katyn massacre report since being liberated to a regular U.S. Army Intelligence G-2 officer

Van Vliet was ordered to report to Paris where he made his first deposition about his experiences at the 1943 International Katyn Commission at the European Theater of Operations, United States Army Headquarters War Crimes Branch of the Judge Adjutant Section in Paris, France. He testified that he believed the Soviets murdered the Polish officers who were found in the Katyn Forest mass graves. The report later became known as the Van Vliet Paris Report. Van Vliet then traveled to Washington DC where he reported to General Clayton Lawrence Bissell on May 22, 1945 and dictated an oral statement about his visit to the Katyn Forest. The completed transcribed testimony later became known as the 1945 Van Vliet Report and was immediately lost. Bissell issued a written order instructing Van Vliet which stated "it is directed that you neither mention nor discuss this matter with anyone in or out of the service without specific approval in writing from the War Department". When Van Vliet informed Stewart of Bissell's written instructions, Stewart abided by the order as well.

=== After World War II ===
After WWII, Van Vliet remained silent about his 1943 visit to the Katyn Forest. Congressional members began taking an interest into the Katyn massacre during the late 1940s. On April 26, 1950, Van Vliet was ordered by Major General F. L. Parks to recreate the missing 1945 Van Vliet Report. Van Vliet complied and wrote a 6 page report dated May 11, 1950 which later became known as the 1950 Van Vliet Report.

On February 4, 1952, Van Vliet testified before the United States House Select Committee to Conduct an Investigation of the Facts, Evidence, and Circumstances of the Katyn Forest Massacre which included Michigan Congressman Dondero. His testimony lasted 2 hours and 30 minutes, and he provided the House committee detailed descriptions of his selection by the Germans to attend the International Katyn Commission's Katyn Forest exhumations, and his personal observations while he was in the Katyn Forest. In neither of their open testimonies before the House committee did Van Vliet or Stewart ever mention that they had sent coded messages to MIS-X while still a POW in Oflag 64 about their convictions of the Soviet guilt for the Katyn massacre. Both men continued to respect Bissell's nondisclorsure instructions until Van Vliet was released from Bissell's instructions in 1962 and Stewart was released in 1968 after his retirement from the U.S. Army.

Van Vliet continued to serve as an Infantry officer. He deployed to the Korean War as Executive Officer of the 23d Infantry Regiment, 2nd Infantry Division. Later he served in Japan where he participated in establishing the Japanese Army school system. Two regimental commands followed (one training and one Airborne Infantry) as well as an assignment in France as part of the Communications Zone. He retired in 1959 as a Colonel.

After retirement from the army, Van Vliet was the Village Manager for Ardlsey, New York. He later moved to Florida where he became the Assistant Parks Director for Pinellas County.

In 1980, Roy L. Towers interviewed Van Vliet and Stewart and produced a documentary for a Master's degree thesis in History. Towers' thesis was entitled The Case of the Missing Officers: The Katyn Forest Massacre, and contains the only known video interviews that Van Vliet and Stewart gave about the Katyn massacre. It was released in June 1984.

In an April 8, 2015 ceremony held in Warsaw, Poland 75 years after the announcement of the discovery of the graves in the Katyn Forest, President Bronislaw Komorowski posthumously awarded Van Vliet and Stewart the Officers Cross of the Order of Merit of the Republic of Poland. They are the only two U.S. Army officers to have received this medal.

On April 11, 2015, a monument honoring Van Vliet and Stewart was unveiled at the former Oflag 64 site in Szubin Poland. The monument acknowledged the code letters that Van Vliet and Stewart sent to U.S. Military Intelligence in 1943 and 1944 which stated that they believed the Soviets murdered the Polish officers who were found in the Katyn Forest.

== Marriage and children ==
While attending a course at Yale, Van Vliet met Miriam Samelson Barton whose husband had been killed testing planes during WWII. They were married on January 12, 1947, and Van Vliet adopted Jacqueline Lee Barton Van Vliet. They had three children together:

- John H. Van Vliet III
- Susan Van Vliet
- Sara Van Vliet

== Death ==
Van Vliet died on 5 February 2000 in Sandy Springs, Georgia, of multiple age-related factors. He and his wife, Miriam, are buried in the cemetery at the United States Military Academy.

== Recognition ==

Badge	Combat Infantryman Badge with Star (denoting 2nd award)		
Badge	Parachutist Badge		
1st Row	Silver Star Medal	Bronze Star Medal with one "V" for Valor	POW Medal
2nd Row	American Defense Service Medal	American Campaign Medal	European-African-Middle Eastern Campaign Medal with two Battle Stars
3rd Row	World War II Victory Medal	National Defense Service Medal	Korean Service Medal

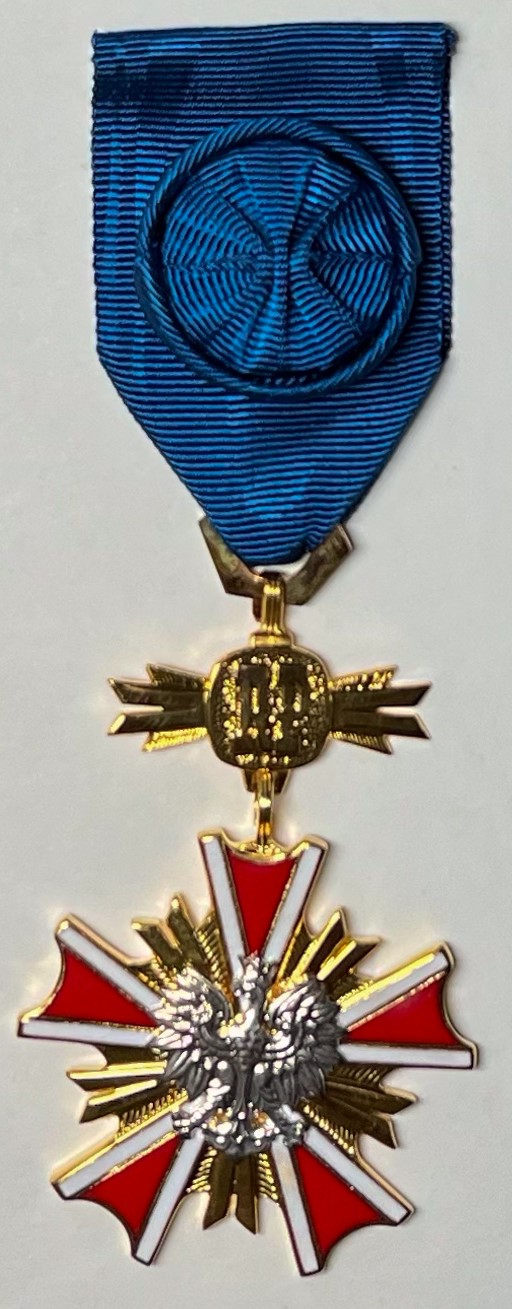
Officers Cross of the Order of Merit of the Republic of Poland

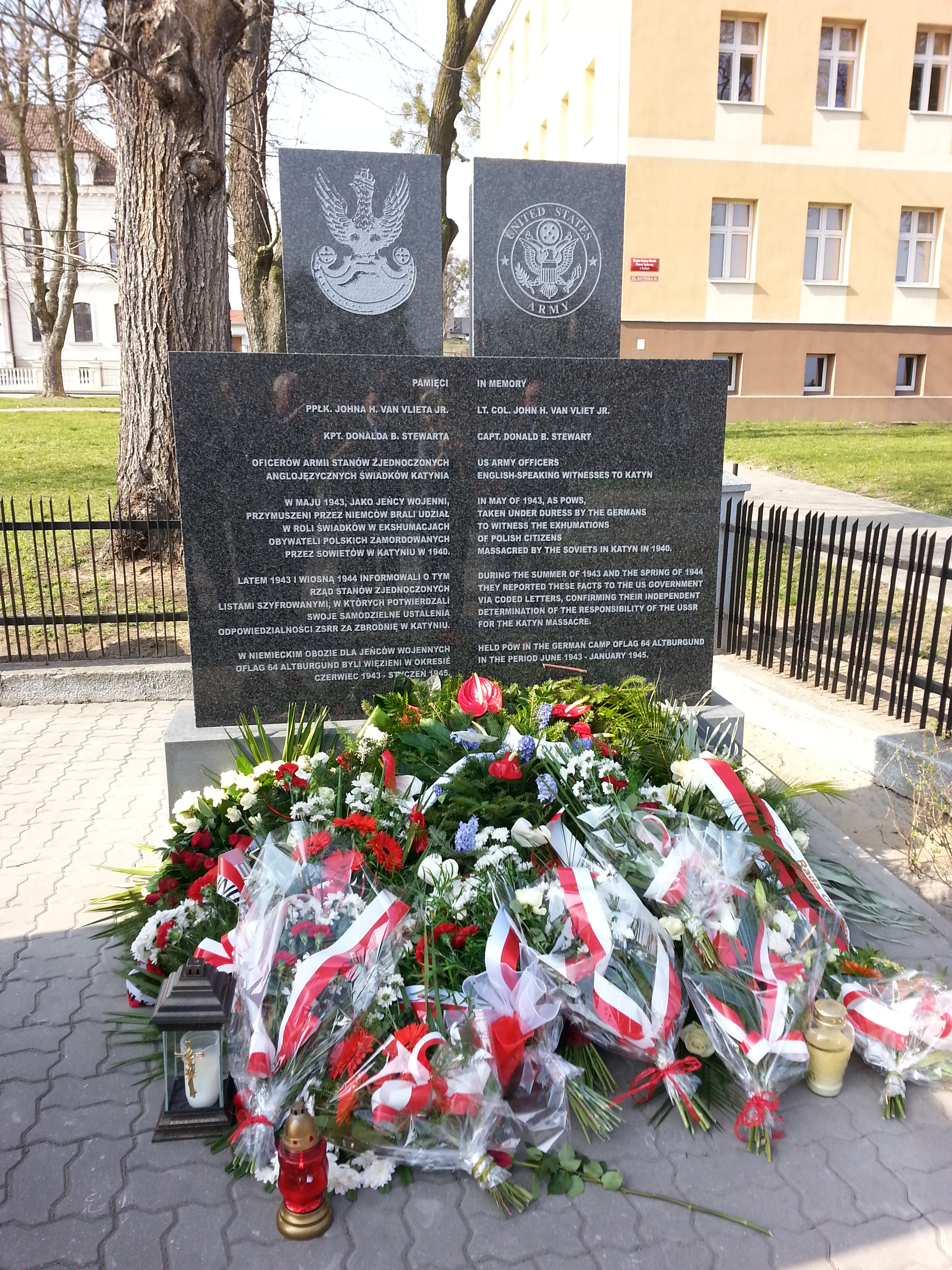
Memorial for LTC John H. Van Vliet Jr and CPT Donald B. Stewart at the former site of the Oflag 64 POW camp in Szubin, Poland.

== Media ==
- Im Wald von Katyn (1943 documentary about the Katyn Commission investigation produced by the Government of Nazi Germany - the Allied POW party with Van Vliet Jr & Stewart can be seen at the 7:08 mark.)
- Video on YouTube The Case of the Missing Officers: The Katyn Forest Massacre (Roy L. Towers, Jr., 1985)
- Video on YouTube Oflag 64: A POW Odyssey (PBS, 2000)

== See also ==
- Donald B. Stewart
- Katyn (rural locality)
- Katyn Commission
- Katyn (film)
