= Tatarka common graves =

WWII-era graves found in Odessa

- Location: 46°25′29″N 30°36′54″E; Tatarka, near Odesa
- Date: 1938–1940
- Victims: between 3,500 and 5,000
- Perpetrator: NKVD

The Tatarka common graves were mass graves discovered in April–August 1943, during World War II, by Axis-allied Romanian troops occupying Transnistria, on a lot of 1,000 m^{2} (11,000 sq ft) in Tatarka, now Prylymanske, in Odesa Raion, near Odesa. Some 42 separate common graves of several dozen bodies each were identified, containing between 3,500 and 5,000 bodies, of which 516 were exhumed, studied, and buried in a cemetery before the region became a front line. The commission set up by the Romanian authorities to investigate these graves reported that among the dead were persons arrested in the Moldavian ASSR in 1938–1940 and in Bessarabia and northern Bukovina in 1940–1941.

Excavation of the Tatarka site was resumed in 2021. After the discovery of new documents from the Romanian archives by an Odesa-based historian, Oleksandr Babich, further 29 mass graves were found. The graves contain the remains of between 5,000 and 8,000 people executed by the NKVD.

== Overview ==
The Kingdom of Romania joined Operation Barbarossa on 22 June 1941 in order to reclaim the lost territories of Bessarabia and Northern Bukovina, which had been annexed by the Soviet Union in June 1940. Transnistria — the territory between the Dniester and Southern Bug — was conquered by the Axis powers from the Soviet Union, and occupied from 19 August 1941 to 29 January 1944. Romania administered the territory as the Transnistria Governorate, with the administrative capital at Odessa.

From spring until June 1943, in Tatarka, a group of specialists from Odessa searched a lot of land of 1,000 square metres (11,000 sq ft), where a large number of bodies was allegedly found. The group included Dr. K. Shapochkin, deputy chief of the Medical-Sanitar Direction of the Government of Transnistria, N. I. Grubianu, the administrator of the disinfection section, docent I. Ya. Fidlovsky (Romanian: I. Ia. Fidlovschi), chief of medical-legal expertise, and Grigore Tatarciuc, gendarme representative of the Odessa pretorial office. The group reported that these were the remains of victims of NKVD repressions from 1938–1940, and of deportees from Besarabia and Northern Bukovina, shot by the Soviets because they could no longer transport them. In order to facilitate the putrefaction process, the lot was covered with animal excrement. In early May, the Romanian authorities organized a visit by foreign officials (including the Italian consul), who were shown the corpses discovered in the Tatarka mass graves.

A Romanian intelligence report from 1 June 1943, signed by lieutenant-colonel Traian Borcescu stated that "On the lot called Spolka, situated 7 km (4.3 mi) from the rail line Odessa–Ovidiopol, between the suburb Tatarka [of Odessa] and the airfield, common graves of NKVD victims were found. The work to uncover the bodies have started on 22 April 1943 and were done by the Military Pretorial Service of Odessa. [...] From the declaration of inhabitants in the vicinity of the lot, it follows that the NKVD troops were bringing corpses during the night in a covered track, and were throwing them into the common grave, and had them immediately covered. It also follows from these declarations that the road parallel to the lot was totally forbidden to circulation, and was severely guarded."

Investigators stated that the executions had increased in pace after 1940, once Bessarabia and Bukovina were occupied by the Soviet Union. "Ioan Halip, Grigore Tatarcu and Alexandru Ivanov, from Bessarabia and Bukovina, currently living in Odessa, have recognized at the place among the bodies their relatives deported by NKVD after the occupation. [...] The Commission to examine the corpses and determining the circumstances in which the victims died has determined that the victims were generally shot in the back of the head from a very short distance. The age of the executions is estimated at 2-3 years, the clothes were characteristic to those of inhabitants of Bessarabia and Bukovina."

On 6 August 1943, the commission headed by forensic doctor Alexandru Birkle presented a "Provisional medico-legal report on the investigations at Tatarka". Birkle was a medical expert from the Romanian Ministry of Justice, and chief medical doctor and professor at the Institute of Forensic Medicine and Criminology in Bucharest; he was also a member of the Katyn Commission that studied the remains found at the site of the Soviet-perpetrated Katyn massacre, and a member of the international commission of experts who investigated the Vinnytsia massacre. His Tatarka commission included as members C. Chirilă, subdirector of Health in the Romanian Government of Transnistria; and one representative each from the mayor's office of Odessa, from the Romanian Gendarmerie unit in Transnistria, and from Odessa University. According to the report, 42 common graves were discovered, as well as signs of 10-20 others. In each grave, around 80 corpses were found. A total of approximately 3,500 corpses lied in the 42 graves, and the total number of bodies was estimated at 5,000. The dead were mostly Germans, Romanians, Bulgarians, and Armenians. Only 516 corpses were exhumed at the time, and of these, 486 were already examined medico-legally with the following conclusions:

- Cause of death: shot in the upper back part of the skull; in a few cases in the lower back part of the skull.
- Shots were delivered from military revolvers, caliber 7 mm and 5.5 mm from immediate distance to the target.
- Medico-legal researches have demonstrated that the age of the corpses is 3.5–5 years. From the study of several identity papers found, it follows that some of the victims were dead for 4.5–5 years (since 1938).
- No larvae of insects were found, showing that the executions took place in cold weather, and that the bodies were buried immediately after being shot.
- The process of putrefaction has been slowed due to a large number of corpses in a single place.
- Of the 486 examined corpses, all had hands tied at their back, with the exception of one, which had only traces of tied hands.
- Of the examined corpses, 7 were women and 479 were men, of which one was in military uniform. Of those, 385 were buried, 131 not yet.
- 43 corpses had identity papers (excerpts of reports from their arrests and searches), which allowed their identification.
- The ones identified were arrested on the territory controlled by the USSR (including from 1940 on from Bessarabia and Northern Bukovina).
- Age: 20–30 years – 60; 30–40 years – 189; 40–50 years – 186; over 50 years – 81. Of these, 7 were females and 509 males; 515 civilians and one military.

== See also ==
- List of massacres in the Soviet Union
- Fântâna Albă massacre
- Katyn massacre
- Vinnytsia massacre
- NKVD prisoner massacres
- Lunca massacre
