= Ljudevit Jurak =

Croatian pathologist

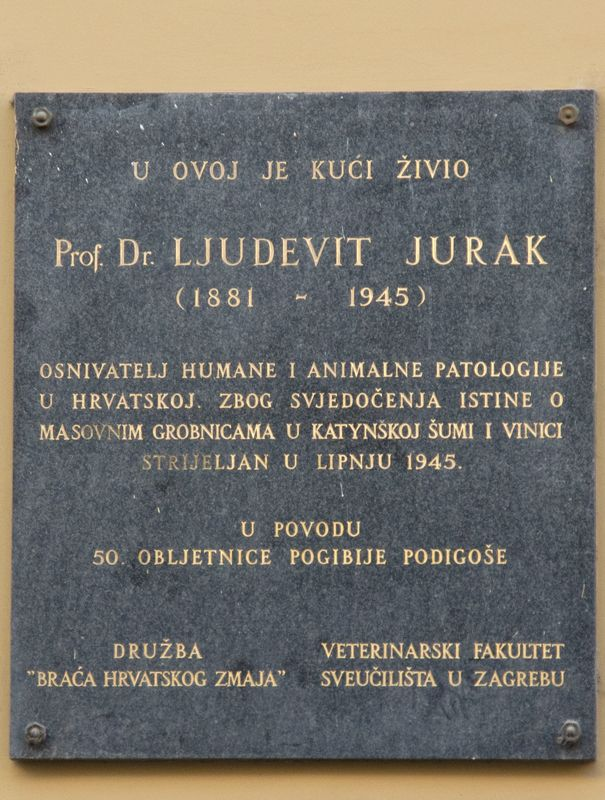

Ljudevit Jurak (October 6, 1881 – June 9, 1945) was a Croatian professor of pathology who was executed by the Yugoslav government for his research into the Vinnytsia massacre.

Jurak was born in Zalug near Hum na Sutli. He studied medicine at the University of Innsbruck where he graduated in 1910. In 1914 Jurak came to Zagreb where he led the Department of Pathology at the Sisters of Charity Hospital, a post he held until his death.

In 1915 Jurak and German physician Felix Gaisbock published a paper in a renowned journal Zentralblatt für Herz- und Gefässkrankheiten in which they described both Lev's and Legendre's disease half a century before its contemporaries.

Jurak collaborated on Mate Ujević's Croatian Encyclopedia.

In 1943, Jurak was among those invited by the International Committee of the Red Cross to take part in an investigation into the massacre of ethnic Ukrainians at Vinnytsia in the 1930s. This investigation concluded that the Soviet Union had been responsible for the massacre. He also commented on the Soviet responsibility for the Katyn massacre. His article about it was published in the Zagreb newspaper run by the Independent State of Croatia. When World War II in Yugoslavia ended, OZNA had Jurak killed by firing squad in Zagreb in June 1945.

Since the democratic changes in 1990, the Ljudevit Jurak Clinical Department of Pathology in Zagreb has borne his name.

== See also ==
- Eduard Miloslavić
