= Vinnytsia massacre =

1937–38 mass execution in Ukraine

- Part of the Great Purge
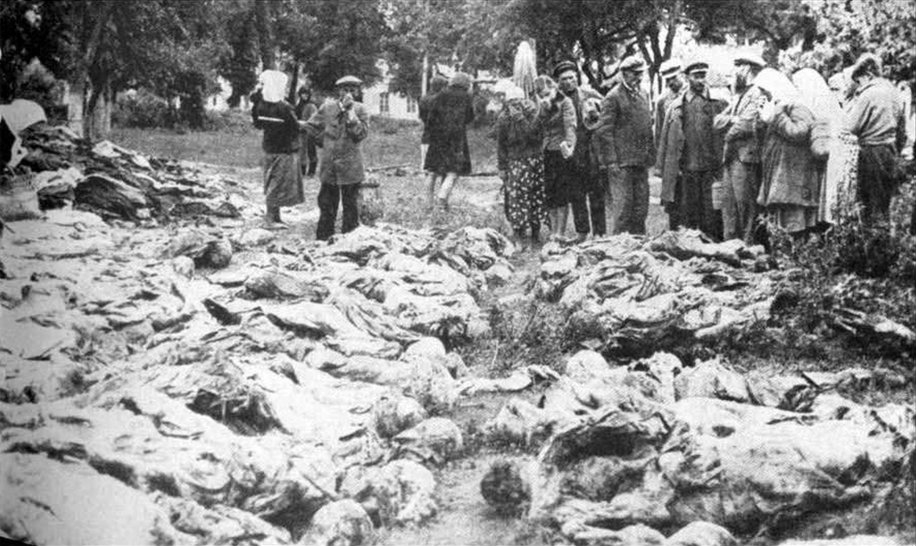

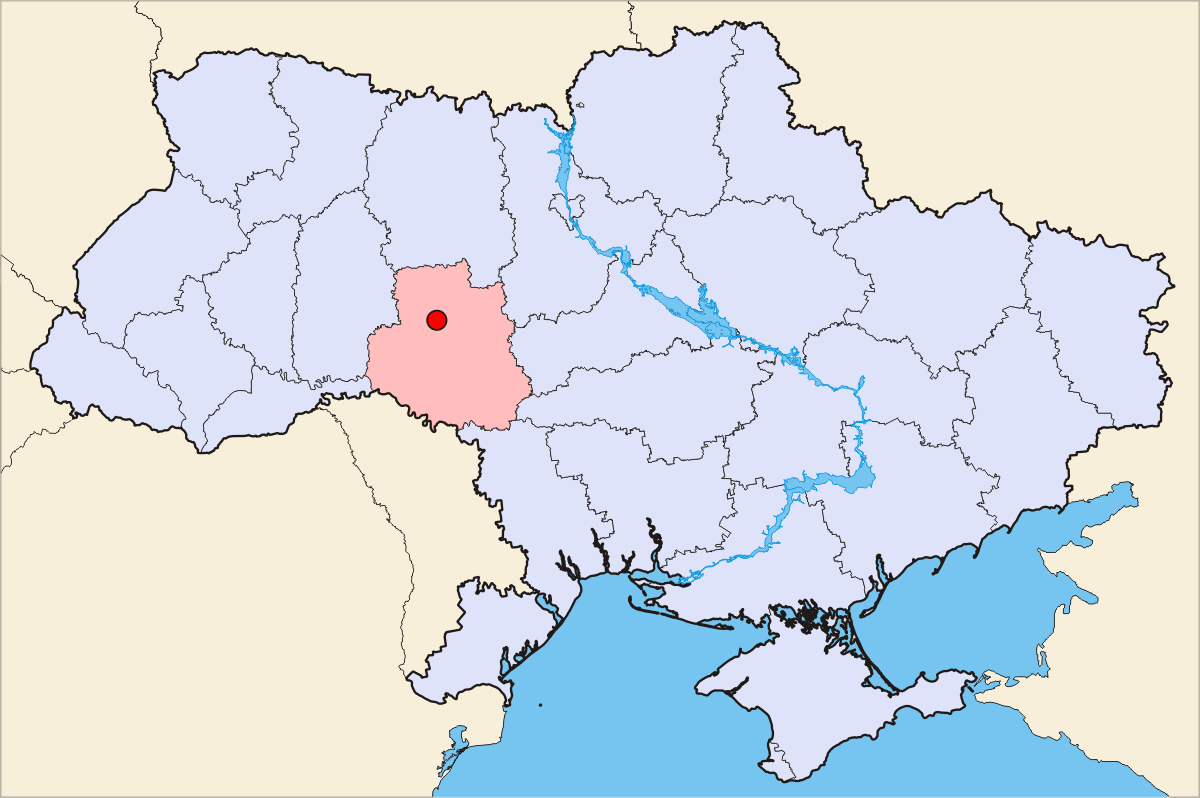
- Location: 49°08′N 28°17′E; Vinnytsia, Ukrainian SSR, Soviet Union
- Date: 1937–1938
- Target: Political prisoners, ethnic Poles
- Attack type: Summary executions
- Deaths: over 9,000
- Perpetrator: NKVD

The Vinnytsia massacre was the mass execution of over 9,000 people in the Ukrainian town of Vinnytsia by the Soviet secret police NKVD during the Great Purge in 1937–1938, which Nazi Germany discovered during its occupation of Ukraine in 1943. The investigation of the site first conducted by the international Katyn Commission coincided with the discovery of a similar mass murder site of Polish prisoners of war in Katyn. Among the 679 dead identified by the Germans in 1943, there were also a certain number of Russians and 28 Poles. Nazi propaganda invoked mention of the massacre to illustrate communist terror by the Soviet Union.

== History ==
=== Massacre ===
Most of the victims buried at Vinnytsia were killed using .22 calibre bullets fired into the back of the neck. Due to the small calibre of the bullet, most victims were shot twice, and at least 78 of them were shot three times; 395 of the victims found there had their skulls broken in addition to traces of gunshot trauma. Almost all men whose remains were excavated had their hands tied. Older women were dressed in some form of clothing, whereas younger victims were buried naked.

The executions were clandestine; the families were not informed of their relatives' fate. Personal belongings, documents and trial documentation were not preserved and instead were buried in a separate pit not far from the mass graves.

=== The investigation commission ===
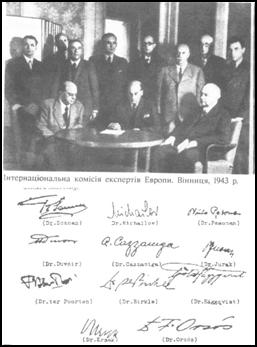
The International commission investigating the mass murder in Vinnytsia, 1943

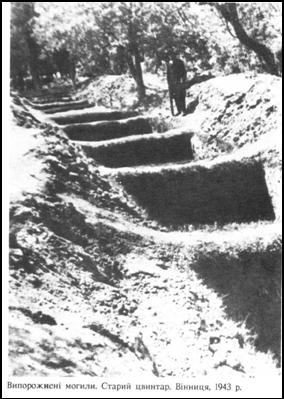
Mass graves for the victims

The first examinations of the exhumed bodies were made by doctors such as professor Gerhard Schrader of the University of Halle-Wittenberg, docent Doroshenko of Vinnytsia, and professor Malinin of Krasnodar, respectively. The excavations started in May 1943 at three locations: the fruit orchard in the west, the central cemetery, and the People's Park. Most of the bodies were found in the fruit orchard (5,644 bodies). Altogether, 91 mass graves were discovered at the three locations, and 9,432 bodies were exhumed; 149 of them were women. The excavations at the People's Park were not finished, though many more bodies were thought to be buried there.

After a preliminary investigation conducted by Professor Schrader's team, two teams of medical examiners were invited—one international and the other made up of 13 experts from universities in Nazi Germany. An international commission of experts in anatomy and forensic pathology were brought in from 11 countries in Europe, predominantly from Nazi Germany's allied or occupied states. They were:

- Dr. Soenen, Ghent University, Occupied Belgium.
- Dr. Michailov, Sofia University, Kingdom of Bulgaria.
- Dr. Niilo Pesonen, University of Helsinki, Republic of Finland.
- Dr. Duvoir, University of Paris, Occupied France.
- Dr. Cazzaniga, University of Milan, Fascist Italy.
- Dr. Ljudevit Jurak, University of Zagreb, Independent State of Croatia.
- Dr. ter Poorten, University of Amsterdam, The Occupied Netherlands
- Dr. Alexandru Birkle, Institute of Forensic Medicine and Criminology, Bucharest, Kingdom of Romania.
- Dr. Gösta Häggqvist, Karolinska Institutet, Stockholm, Kingdom of Sweden.
- Dr. Krsek, University of Bratislava, Slovak Republic.
- Dr. Ferenc Orsós, University of Budapest, Kingdom of Hungary.

The group visited the mass graves between July 13 and July 15, 1943. The Nazi German commission completed its report on July 29, 1943. Both commissions determined that almost all of the victims were executed by two shots in the back of the head between 1937 and 1938.

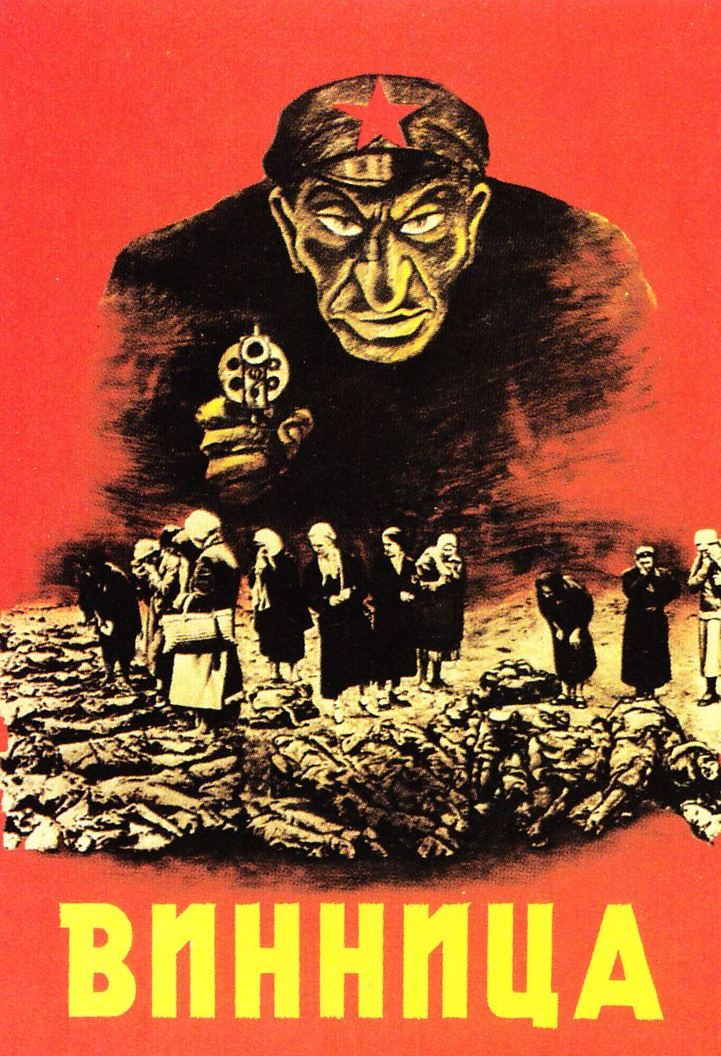
German propaganda poster of c. 1943 with text "Vinnitsa"; the NKVD gunman has stereotypically Jewish features, in accordance with the Nazi idea of "Judeo-Bolshevism".

468 bodies were identified by people of Vinnytsia and the surroundings; the other 202 were identified on the basis of documents and evidence found in the graves. Most bodies that were identified this way were Ukrainians; there were also 28 bodies that were identified as ethnic Poles.

=== Later history ===
Besides the original group of thirteen, several other delegations visited the sites in mid-1943. Among them were politicians and other officials from the Kingdom of Bulgaria, Occupied Denmark, Occupied Greece, the Republic of Finland, and the Kingdom of Sweden. Photos and results of the investigation were published in many countries in Europe, and were used by Nazi Germany in the propaganda war against the Soviet Union.

Most of the bodies were reburied after a burial service led by metropolit Vissarion of Odessa. The service was also attended by many other Orthodox bishops and foreign church officials.

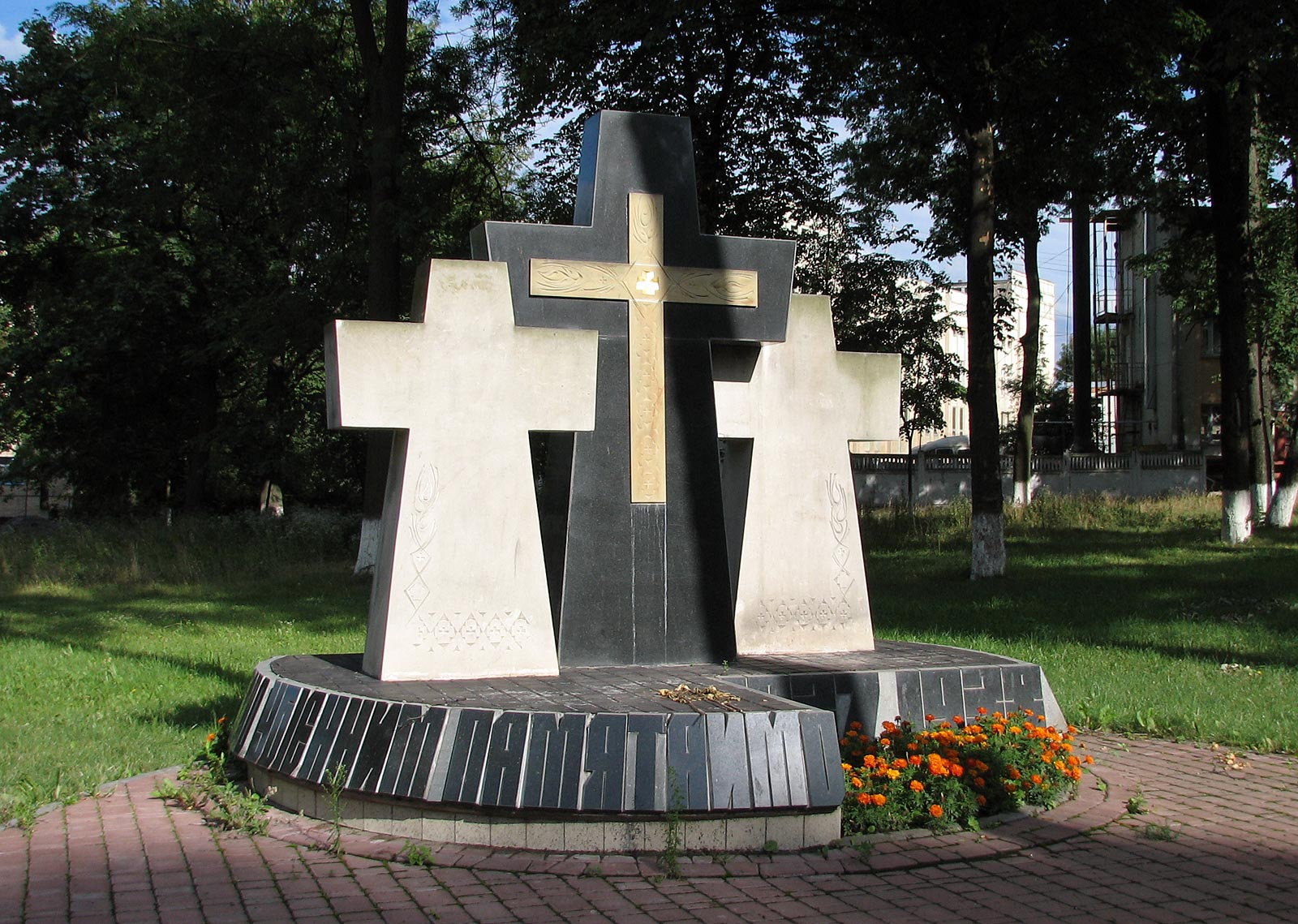
Vinnytsia Memorial

Around the time of the reburials, funds were raised to erect a temporary obelisk with the inscription "Victims of Stalinism are buried here". After the Soviets retook Vinnytsia in March 1944, authorities rededicated the monument to victims of fascism, finally completely removing it and creating an entertainment park in its place. In the last ten years a new monument has been constructed at the burial site in the park; it only refers to "Victims of Totalitarianism". During Soviet times, information about the massacre was disseminated and investigated by the Ukrainian diaspora in the West. The mass murder in Vinnytsia returned as a critical topic in Ukraine in 1988.

== See also ==
- Bykivnia mass grave near Kyiv
- Dem'ianiv Laz, massacre near Ivano-Frankivsk
- Fântâna Albă massacre
- Katyn massacre
- Kurapaty mass grave near Minsk, Belarus
- List of massacres in the Soviet Union
- Lunca massacre
- Mass graves in the Soviet Union
- Sandarmokh
- Solovki prison camp
- Svirlag
- Tatarka common graves

== Literature ==
- Causarano, Pietro (2004). Le XXe siècle des guerres. Editions de l'Atelier. p. 510. ISBN 2708237624.
- Ihor Kamenetsky. The Tragedy of Vinnytsia: Materials on Stalin's Policy of Extermination in Ukraine/1936-1938, Ukrainian Historical Assn (1991) ISBN 978-0-685-37560-0
- Sandul, I. I., A. P. Stepovy, S. O. Pidhainy. The Black Deeds Of The Kremlin: A White Book. Ukrainian Association of Victims of Russian Communist Terror. Toronto. 1953
- Israel Charny, William S. Parsons, and Samuel Totten. Century of Genocide: Critical Essays and Eyewitness Accounts. Routledge. New York, London. ISBN 0-415-94429-5
- Dragan, Anthony. Vinnytsia: A Forgotten Holocaust. Jersey City, NJ: Svoboda Press, Ukrainian National Association 1986, octavo, 52 pp.
- Crime of Moscow in Vynnytsia. Ukrainian Publication of the Ukrainian American Youth Association, Inc. New York. 1951
- Вінниця - Злочин Без Кари. Воскресіння. Київ. 1994
- Вінницький злочин // Енциклопедія українознавства.: [В 10 т.]. - Перевид. в Україні. - Київ., 1993. - Т.1. - С.282
- Weiner, Amir (2001). Making sense of war: the Second World War and the fate of the Bolshevik Revolution. Princeton, N.J: Princeton University Press. ISBN 0-691-05702-8.
- Paperno, Irina (2001). "Exhuming the Bodies of Soviet Terror". Representations. 75 (1): 89–118. doi:10.1525/rep.2001.75.1.89. JSTOR 10.1525/rep.2001.75.1.89.
