= Alexandru Birkle =

Romanian forensic pathologist

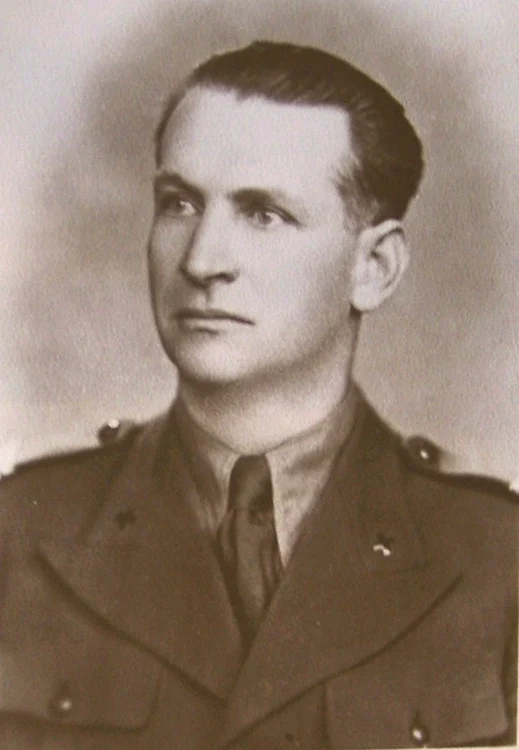
- Born: 1896
- Died: 1986 (aged 89–90)
- Education: University of Bucharest
- Occupation: forensic pathologist
- Spouse: Olimpia Mănescu
- Children: Rodica Marta

Alexandru Birkle, also known as Alexandru Bircle (* 1896; † 1986 in New York) was a Romanian forensic pathologist.

He was a member of two international medical commissions whose members, in 1943, at the invitation of the German occupiers, performed autopsies on the victims of the Katyn massacre and the Vinnytsia massacre, and was therefore later persecuted by the Soviet secret police, the NKVD.

== Life ==
=== Pre-war period ===
Birkle's ancestors had emigrated from Austria to Bucharest. In 1916, he volunteered for the Romanian Armed Forces during the First World War and was taken as a prisoner of war by the Austrians.

From 1919 to 1925, he studied medicine in Bucharest, specializing in forensic medicine. After his first job in Brașov, he was appointed to the Forensic Medicine Institute in Bucharest.

=== During World War II ===
After his habilitation, he took over the leadership of the institute in 1942, thus being directly subordinate to the Romanian Ministry of Justice.

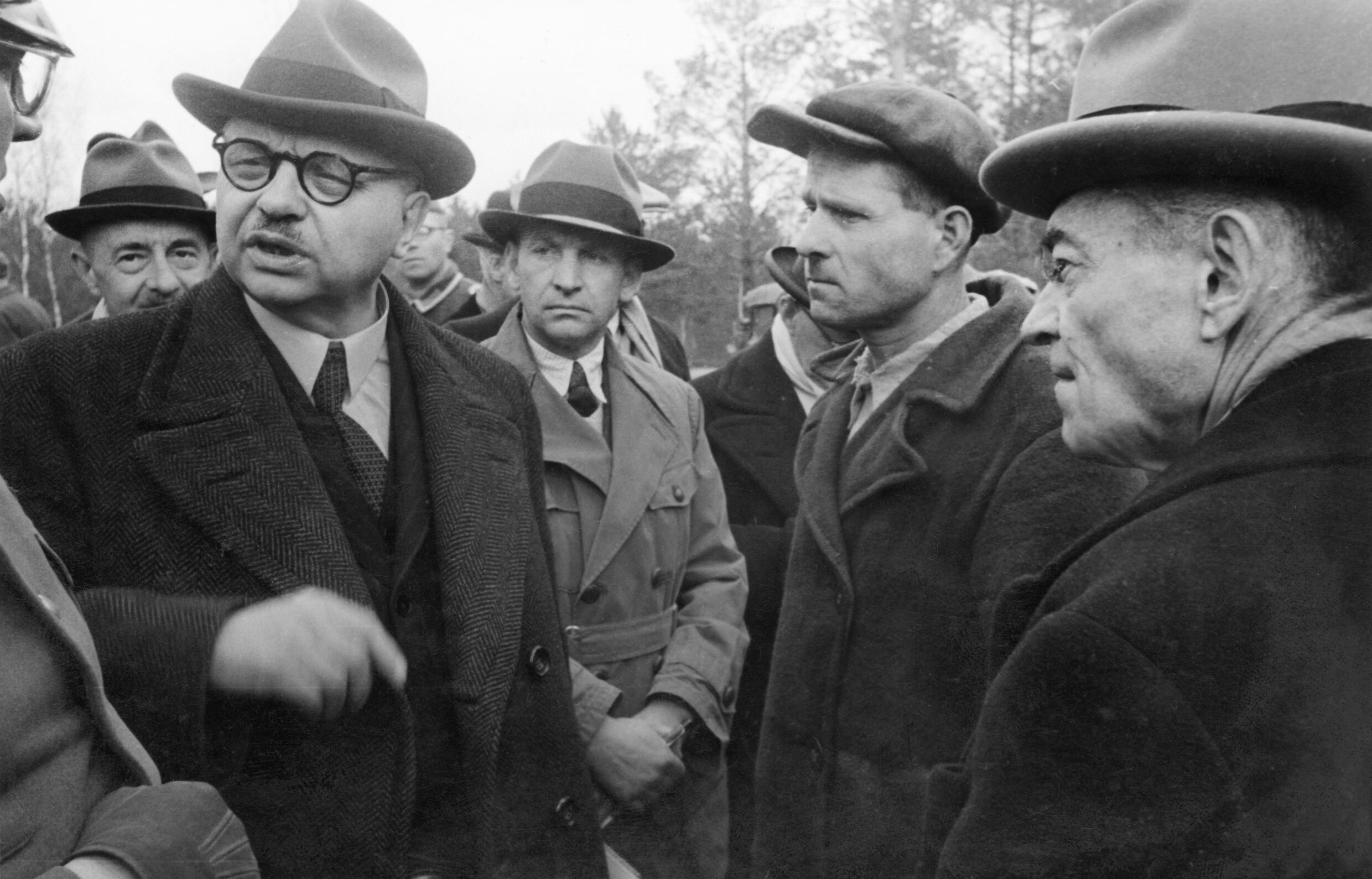
Alexandru Birkle (middle) in Katyn. To his right, in the foreground, is the Hungarian forensic pathologist, Prof. Ferenc Orsós

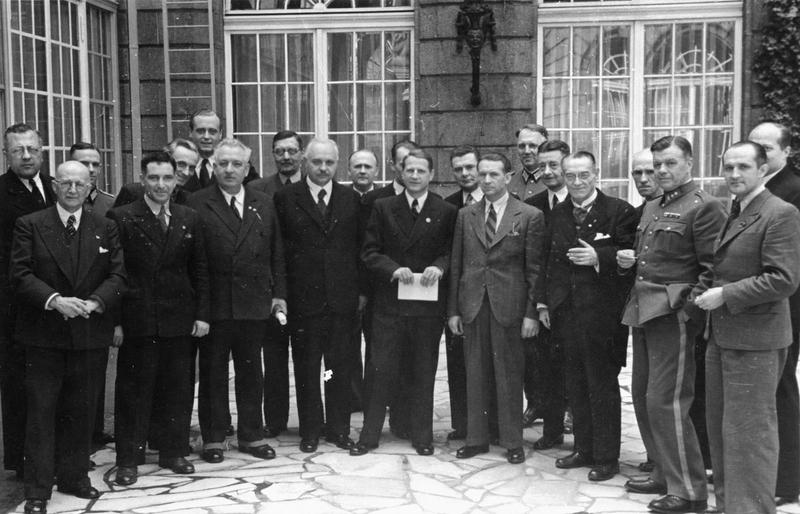
The International Katyn Commission Alexandru Birkle is the 14th from left to right

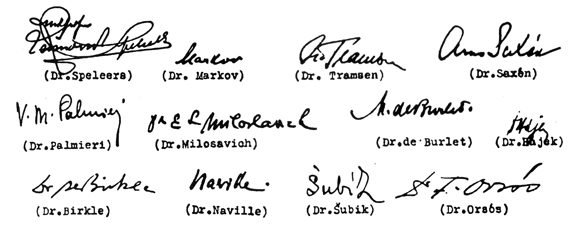
Dr. Birkle's signature under the final protocol of the International Katyn Commission, 1943

In April 1943, the Ministry of Justice assigned him to the International Medical Commission of Katyn, which, at the invitation of the Reich Health Leader Leonardo Conti, investigated the mass graves of more than 4,000 shot Polish officers and cadets in the forest of Katyn. He signed the final report, edited by the Hungarian medical professor Ferenc Orsós, which dated the mass executions to the spring of 1940, indirectly attributing the crime to the Soviet secret police NKVD.

Besides Orsós, Birkle was the only member of the Katyn Commission who participated in the examinations of mass graves with Ukrainian victims in Vinnytsia in July 1943. The international experts also concluded that this was a crime of the NKVD, with the mass executions having taken place during the Great Purge of 1937/38.

Due to his involvement in both commissions, Birkle was sought by the NKVD after the Red Army entered Bucharest at the end of August 1944. He hid for several months with friends. The Romanian secret police Securitate detained his wife and daughter for a month, but they did not reveal his hiding place.

=== Post-war period ===
In the summer of 1945, his relatives bought a forged passport, allowing him to escape to Western Europe. Via France, he reached Argentina, and from there moved to Peru, where he took a professorship in forensic medicine in Lima. In 1946, a military tribunal sentenced him in absentia to 20 years of labor camp for "collaboration."

In early 1952, he testified anonymously behind a screen before the Madden Committee, the investigative committee of the United States House of Representatives regarding the Katyn massacre. However, the Romanian authorities learned of it; a court in Bucharest sentenced his wife and daughter to five years of forced labor each for "collaboration with the enemy of the state." After the death of Joseph Stalin on March 5, 1953, their sentence was halved.

In the summer of 1952, Birkle was seriously injured in a traffic accident in the United States, the cause of which could not be clarified. After recovering, he stayed in the United States and worked as a psychiatrist. He died in 1986 in New York without ever seeing his family again.

After his death, a Securitate agent, posing as his daughter, claimed his inheritance in the United States. The real daughter only learned of this after the fall of the communist regime in Romania, when she accessed her Securitate files. She and her mother were rehabilitated by the Romanian authorities in 1992.

== Literature ==
- Ion Constantin: Rolul medicului legist Alexandru Birkle în apărarea și susținerea adevărului cu privire la masacrele de la Katyń, in: Polonia și România, de la vecinatate istorică la parteneriatul european. Materialele simpozionului. Ed. St. Iachimovschi. Suceava 2009, S. 259–264.
- Florian Stănescu: Le médecin légiste Alexandre Bircle: devoir, sacrifices et souffrances sur la vérité sur Katyn, in: Katyn et la Suisse. Experts et expertises médicales dans les crises humanitaires. Ed. D. Debons et al. Genf 2009, S. 172–176.
- Thomas Urban: The Katyn Massacre 1940: History of a Crime
