= Herman Maximilien de Burlet =

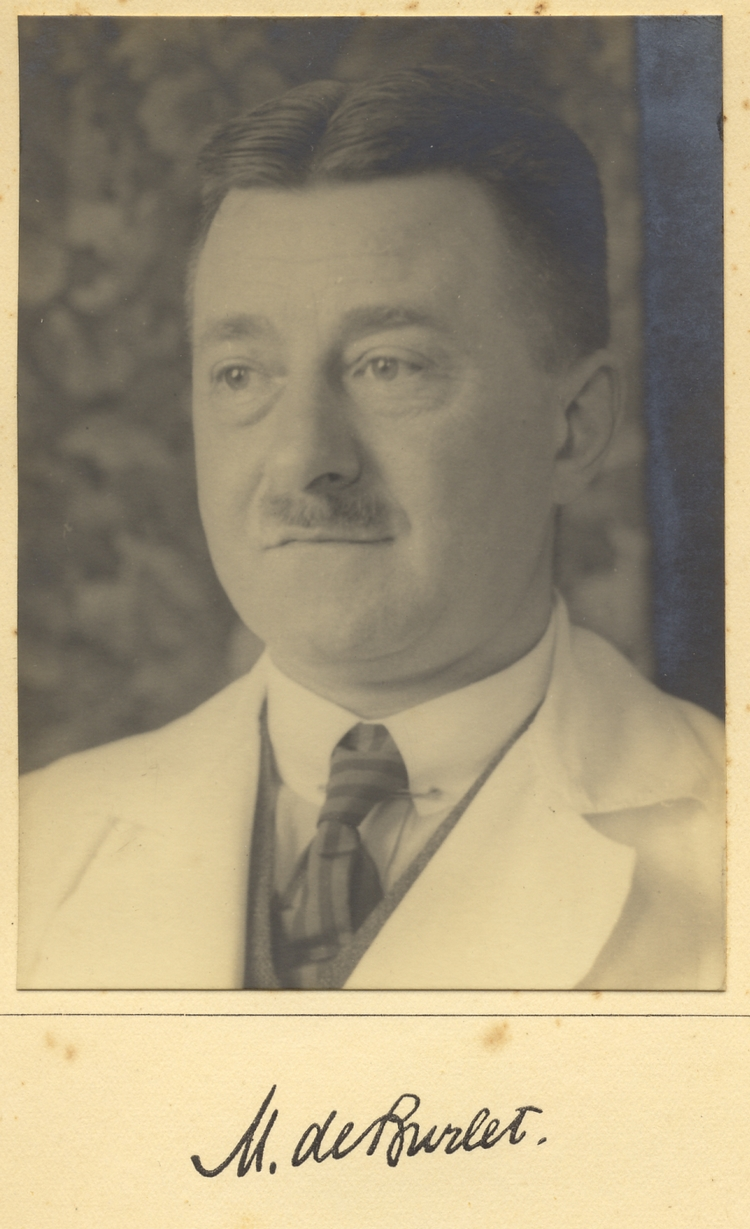
- De Burlet (1932)
- Born: 6 November 1883; Rotterdam, Netherlands
- Died: 23 April 1958 (aged 74); Königswinter, West Germany
- Scientific career
- Fields: Physiology, Anatomy
- Workplaces: University of Groningen

Herman Maximilien de Burlet (Rotterdam, 6 November 1883 – Königswinter, 23 April 1958), was a Dutch anatomist, embryologist, physiologist and pathologist.

On 19 February 1947, De Burlet lost his job due his membership in the NSB. He had already been arrested in April 1945, but was released pending trial. In November 1949, he was sentenced to four years in prison in absentia.

== Selected publications ==
- Die äußeren Formverhältnisse der Leber beim menschlichen Embryo. Dissertation Universität Zürich, Engelmann, Leipzig 1910
- Die äußeren Formverhältnisse der Leber beim menschlichen Embryo. Morphologisches Jahrbuch, 42, 1/2, 1910
- Der perilymphatische Raum des Meerschweinchenohres. Anatomischer Anzeiger, 53, Gustav Fischer, Jena 1920–1921, S. 302–315 (archive.org)
