= Eduard Miloslavić =

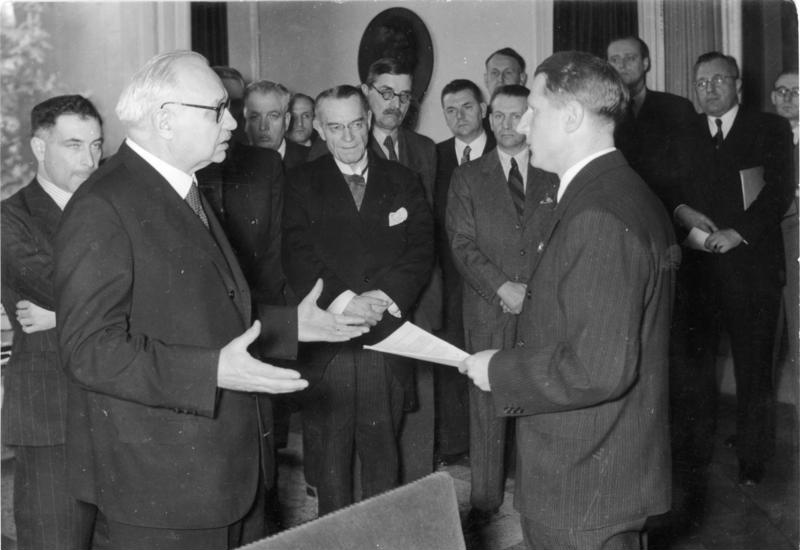
"Reich Health Leader" Leonardo Conti holds the report of the international Katyn Commission on May 4, 1943. Miloslavić is the 4th person from left.

Edward L. Miloslavich or Eduard Miloslavić (December 20, 1884 – November 11, 1952) was a Croatian-American professor of pathology.

A descendant of Croatian emigrants to the United States, he was born in Oakland, California. His father Luko had moved from Župa Dubrovačka (10 km (6.2 mi) from Dubrovnik) to Dubrovnik in 1878. In the same year he married Vica Milković. A few years later the couple emigrated to the United States. The entire family—Luko, Vica, Eduard and his brothers and sisters—returned to Dubrovnik in 1889, at the time in Austria-Hungary.

Miloslavić studied medicine in Vienna, where he became a professor of pathology. In 1920, an invitation came from Marquette University in Wisconsin, to take the chair of pathology, bacteriology and forensic medicine.

In subsequent years "Doc Milo", as colleagues called him, inaugurated criminal pathology in the United States. As an outstanding specialist he was involved in investigations of crimes perpetrated by the Al Capone gang. He was one of the founders of the International Academy for Forensic Medicine, member of many American and European scientific societies and academies, and vice president of the Croatian Fraternal Union (CFU) in the United States.

In 1932, he moved to Zagreb, at the time in Yugoslavia, where he was a full professor at the Faculty of Medicine, University of Zagreb. He also lectured in pastoral medicine in the faculty of theology in Zagreb and was known as an ardent adversary of abortion and euthanasia. In 1940, he was elected a member of the prestigious "Medico-Legal Society" in London. In 1941, he was made a full member of the German Academy of Sciences Leopoldina in Germany, and was awarded doctor "honoris causa" by the University of Vienna, where he had started his scientific career.

After his initiative in 1941 the Faculty of Medicine in Sarajevo was founded in 1944 during the NDH regime.

During his time in Zagreb, in 1943, Miloslavić was among those invited by the Government of Nazi Germany to participate in the Katyn Commission investigating the massacre of 12,000 Polish officers at the Katyn Forest in 1940. This investigation concluded that the Soviet Union had been responsible for the massacre.

Miloslavić moved back to the United States in 1944, where he became pathologist at the De Paul Hospital in St Louis, Missouri. He died at the hospital of heart disease in 1952 aged 67 and was buried at Calvary Cemetery, St Louis.
