= Clayton Lawrence Bissell =

US Air Force general (1896–1972)

Clayton Bissell
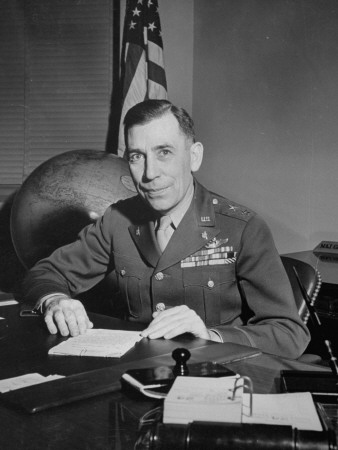
- Born: July 29, 1896; Kane, Pennsylvania
- Died: December 24, 1972 (aged 76); Murfreesboro, Tennessee
- Burial place: Section 5, Site 68, Arlington National Cemetery
- Military career
- Allegiance: United States
- Branch: Air Service, United States Army; United States Army Air Forces; United States Air Force
- Service years: 1917–1950
- Rank: Major General
- Unit: Air Service, United States Army: 148th Aero Squadron
- Commands: 10th Air Force
- Conflicts: World War I World War II
- Awards: Distinguished Service Cross; Distinguished Service Medal (3); Silver Star; Distinguished Flying Cross; Distinguished Flying Cross (U.K.); Air Medal
- Other work: Assistant Chief of Staff for Intelligence (G-2)

Major General Clayton Lawrence Bissell (July 29, 1896 – December 24, 1972) was an air officer in the United States Army and United States Army Air Forces during World War I and World War II.

== World War I service ==
Bissell graduated from Valparaiso University, Indiana, in 1917 with a degree of doctor of laws. He enlisted in the Aviation Section, Signal Reserve, August 15, 1917, and was commissioned a first lieutenant in the Aviation Section, Signal Reserve, January 12, 1918.

He began his aviation training at Mohawk, Canada, in September 1917, and was subsequently stationed at Taliaferro Field, Texas, from November 1917 to January 1918.

He sailed for England with the 22nd Aero Squadron, and received additional flying training at Salisbury Plain in England and aerial gunnery training in Scotland. He served in the Overseas Ferry Service before he was ordered to duty at the front with the 148th Aero Squadron in July 1918. He served with that unit and with the 41st Aero Squadron until the armistice. He was credited officially with destroying five enemy planes and driving one down out of control; these six victories qualify him as an ace. He commanded the 638th Aero Squadron with the American Forces in Germany until May 1919, when he returned to the United States.

== The interwar years ==
His first assignment in the United States was Kelly Field, Texas, where he organized and commanded the 27th Aero Squadron. He was promoted to captain (temporary) March 11, 1919. In January 1920, he became education and recreation officer at Kelly Field, and commanded the Air Service Group.

He was ordered to Washington, D.C., in June 1920, for service as chief of the Tactical Operations Section in the office of Air Service. He was commissioned a first lieutenant in the Air Service, Regular Army, July 1, 1920. In December 1920, he went to Langley Field, Virginia, where he graduated from the Air Service Field Officers School in June 1921. He then remained at Langley Field as flight commander of the 14th Bombardment Squadron, and later became an instructor at the Air Service Field Officers School.

In November 1921, Bissell was ordered to Washington for duty in the office of the Chief of the Air Service, as assistant to Brigadier General William Mitchell, serving in that capacity for four years. On August 3–4, 1922, he completed an overnight 450-mile round trip between Bolling Field, District of Columbia and Mitchel Field, Long Island. Flying a DH-4B biplane with a new navigational compass, Bissell left Bolling before 10 PM and landed on Long Island at 12:35 AM after using visual cues to navigate around a thunderstorm near Trenton, New Jersey. Navigating a straight compass return course, he left Mitchel at 2:15 AM and landed in D.C. at 4:25 AM. During this tour of duty, Bissell was also one of the pilots involved in the controversial Ostfriesland bombing that was the crux of Mitchell's court-martial.

In January 1924, he was detailed as advanced agent for the round-the-world flight in British Columbia, Alaska, the Aleutians, Greenland, Labrador, Newfoundland and the Maritime Provinces. On return to Washington, he was transferred to Langley Field in December 1924 to serve as secretary of the Air Service Board. Between October and December 1925, he served as assistant defense counsel for Mitchell during his court martial, under the direction of lead counsel Congressman Frank R. Reid.

He was an instructor at the Air Corps Tactical School at Langley Field, from September 1926 to August 1931, when he was assigned to the Command and General Staff School at Fort Leavenworth, Kansas, as a student. He graduated in June 1933, and two months later was assigned to the Army War College at Washington, D.C. He graduated in June 1934 and then entered the Chemical Warfare School at Edgewood Arsenal, Maryland. In July 1934, completing the course there a month later.

In October 1934, he was stationed at Schofield Barracks, Hawaii, as intelligence and operations officer of the 18th Pursuit Group, becoming commanding officer in October 1937. In July 1938, he went to the Naval War College at Newport, Rhode Island, and graduated in 1939. In July 1939, he became a member of the War Plans Division of the War Department General Staff at Washington, remaining on this duty until the beginning of World War II.

== World War II ==
In January 1942, he was assigned as principal aviation officer on Major General Stilwell's staff in China; in August 1942 he was made commanding general of the 10th Air Force in India and Burma. He returned to the United States in August 1943.

A month later he became assistant chief of air staff for intelligence at Air Force Headquarters in Washington. In January 1944, he was assigned to the Office of the Assistant Chief of Staff for Intelligence on the War Department General Staff, and served in that capacity during the last two years of World War II. He was the Army member of Joint Security Control and on the Joint Intelligence Committee and the U.S. Army member of the Combined Intelligence Committee. He also served as the Army head of psychological warfare and as head of the War Department historical program. After the death of Franklin D. Roosevelt, Bissell briefed Harry S. Truman on the existence and status of the Manhattan Project.

== Post World War II ==
In May 1946, he became military attaché to Great Britain, and in October 1948, returned to the United States, where he was assigned to the officers' pool at Bolling Air Force Base, D.C.

The following month he was transferred to Headquarters U.S. Air Forces in Europe, with station at Wiesbaden, Germany, where he remained until he returned to the United States in April 1950, for an assignment to Air Force headquarters in Washington, D.C. He retired on October 31, 1950 at the rank of Major General immediately after a hospital stay following a 72-day whirlwind European vacation.

== Controversies ==
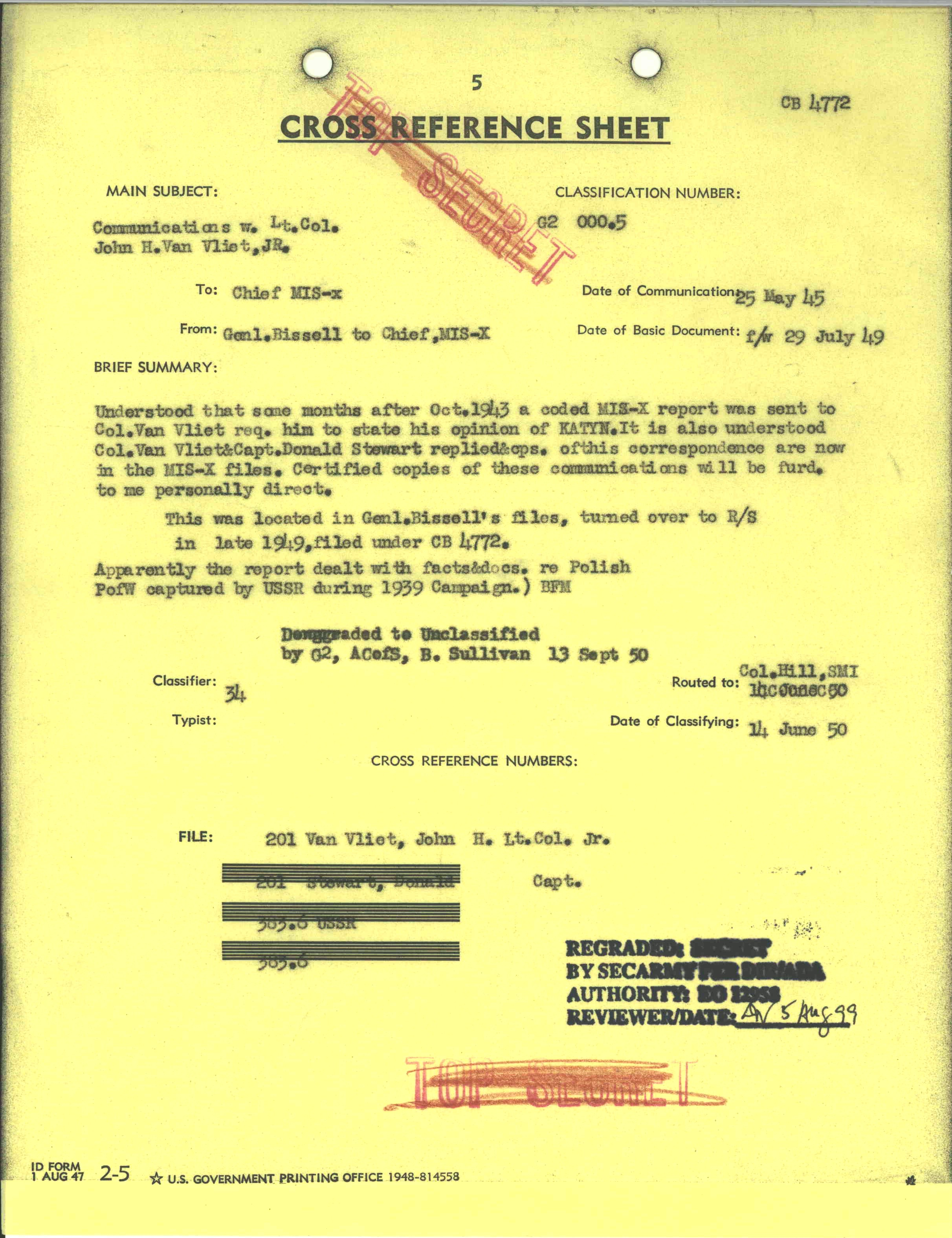
Lt. Col. John H. Van Vliet communication on Katyn

Bissell taught at the Air Tactical School at the same time as did Claire Lee Chennault, later of the Flying Tigers. Bissell once tried to intimidate the Flying Tigers into staying in service by claiming that if they left, as soon as they got back to the United States they'd be drafted into the US Army as privates. The two men became personal enemies when Bissell continued to claim that fighters could not stop bombers from performing their mission. When Chennault was offered an appointment in the U.S. Army Air Corps as a brigadier general, he asked that he be granted a date of rank one day earlier than Bissell's and that was promised, but in the end, Bissell got one day of rank over Chennault. Throughout Bissell's tenure in India, Chennault complained of broken promises about planes, flyers, spare parts and supplies. To resolve the personal animosity, Stilwell ultimately agreed to have Bissell removed from the China Burma India Theater.

In his role as General George Marshall's assistant chief of staff for intelligence, he is known for having ordered the suppression of evidence that the Soviets were responsible for the Katyn massacre of Polish officers. While a prisoner of the Germans, U.S. Army Lieutenant Colonel John H. Van Vliet Jr spent some time at the site of the Katyn massacre, and concluded from what he saw that the Soviets were responsible for the atrocity. On May 22, 1945, immediately upon his arrival in Washington, D.C., after being freed from captivity, Van Vliet filed a personal report with Bissell indicating what he had found. Bissell classified the report Top Secret in order to minimize its circulation, and later the report disappeared from archives.

Although Bissell claimed he had sent the report to the State Department, State said it never received it, and the Army had no receipt to show that it did. When called to account for his actions before a Congressional Committee investigating Katyn in February 1952, Bissell contended that he was merely carrying out the spirit of the Yalta Conference. In 1950, Van Vliet recreated his wartime report In 2014, a copy of Van Vliet's 1945 Paris disposition was discovered.

== Decorations ==

Command Pilot wings
1st Row	Distinguished Service Cross			
2nd Row	Army Distinguished Service Medal w/ two OLCs	Silver Star	Distinguished Flying Cross	Air Medal
3rd Row	Army Commendation Medal	World War I Victory Medal w/battle clasp	Army of Occupation of Germany Medal	American Defense Service Medal
4th Row	American Campaign Medal	Asiatic-Pacific Campaign Medal with three service stars	European-African-Middle Eastern Campaign Medal with one service star	World War II Victory Medal
5th Row	Army of Occupation Medal	National Defense Service Medal	the Most Excellent Order of the British Empire, Degree of Honorary Commander	Distinguished Flying Cross (United Kingdom)
6th Row	War Merit Cross (Italy)	Order of the Crown of Italy	Polish Order of Polonia Restitute, Commander Cross	Grand Officer of the Order of Merit (Chile)

== Effective dates of promotions ==
Insignia	Rank	Date
	Major general	March 13, 1943
	Brigadier general	April 21, 1942
	Colonel	January 5, 1942
	Lieutenant colonel	November 16, 1940
	Major	March 12, 1935
	Captain	November 1, 1930
	First lieutenant	August 15, 1917
	Second lieutenant	Skipped this grade

== Later life ==
After retirement, Bissell lived in Signal Mountain, Tennessee. He died at the Veterans Administration Hospital in Murfreesboro, Tennessee on December 24, 1972. Bissell was interred at Arlington National Cemetery on January 4, 1973.

== See also ==
- List of World War I flying aces from the United States
- George Earle, author of another report on Katyn that was suppressed

== Bibliography ==
- Above the Trenches: a Complete Record of the Fighter Aces and Units of the British Empire Air Forces 1915–1920. Christopher F. Shores, Norman L. R. Franks, Russell Guest. Grub Street, 1990. ISBN 0-948817-19-4, ISBN 978-0-948817-19-9.
- American Aces of World War I. Norman Franks, Harry Dempsey. Osprey Publishing, 2001. ISBN 1-84176-375-6, ISBN 978-1-84176-375-0.
