= United States House Select Committee to Conduct an Investigation of the Facts, Evidence, and Circumstances of the Katyn Forest Massacre =

Investigation Commission into the Katyn Massacre

The Select Committee to Conduct an Investigation and Study of the Facts, Evidence, and Circumstances of the Katyn Forest Massacre was established by United States House of Representatives in 1951, during the Korean War. At that time, there was concern that the Katyn Massacre could have served as a "blueprint" for the execution of U.S. troops by Communist forces.

== Background ==
Nazi Germany and the Soviet Union each invaded Poland in September 1939, having divided the country into separate spheres of influence under the Molotov–Ribbentrop Pact. While the Germans began a massacre of Jews and Poles in western occupied Poland, the Red Army arrested and imprisoned thousands of Polish military officers, policemen, and intelligentsia during their occupation of eastern Poland. Prisoners of war and civilian internees captured by the Soviets were placed in several camps in the western USSR, run by the Soviet People's Commissariat for Internal Affairs, or NKVD, a predecessor organization to the modern FSB-camps including Kozielsk, Ostashkov, and Starobielsk.

In April 1943, in the Katyn Forest near Smolensk in the Soviet Union, occupying German troops discovered eight large graves containing the remains of thousands of the Polish Army officers and intellectual leaders who had been interned at the prisoner-of-war camp at Kozielsk. Bodies of the prisoners who had been housed at Ostashkov and Starobielsk were discovered near Piatykhatky and Mednoye, respectively. Collectively, these murders are known as the Katyn Forest Massacre.

An internationally staffed medical commission organized by the Germans excavated the area in early spring 1943. As the excavation progressed, the Germans brought in several groups of observers, including some American prisoners-of-war. This commission determined that the massacre occurred in 1940, when the area was under Soviet control—a determination which was then used as a propaganda tool intended to disrupt the alliance between the US, Great Britain, and the Soviet Union. This effort was successful in part, as Polish intelligence sources immediately blamed the Soviets for the atrocities, leading to a break in diplomatic relations between Poland and the USSR.

After their recapture of Smolensk in the autumn of 1943, the Soviet government organized its own excavation. This second enquiry concluded that the Polish prisoners of war had been captured and executed by invading German units in August 1941.

The official American response at the time was one of non-involvement. In a June 1943 telegram to Churchill, Roosevelt expressed approval that the British approach to Stalin was grounded "upon the obvious necessity of creating the most favorable conditions for bringing the full weight of the armed forces of all the United Nations to bear upon the common enemy. ... The winning of the war is the paramount objective for all of us. For this unity is necessary."

== Formation of the Committee ==
Later, on September 18, 1951, the United States House of Representatives established the Select Committee to Conduct an Investigation and Study of the Facts, Evidence, and Circumstances of the Katyn Forest Massacre, known as the Madden Committee after its chairman, Rep. Ray J. Madden of Indiana. The committee assembled records relating to the massacre and its aftermath, including records from the files of the State and War Departments, in addition to hearing extensive witness testimony. Their purpose was to determine which nation was responsible for the atrocities and whether any American officials had engaged in covering up the massacre.

The Madden Committee determined unanimously that the NKVD was responsible for the executions, and recommended a trial before the International World Court of Justice. The question of an American cover-up was less clear cut. In its final report, the committee concluded that American officials failed to properly evaluate and act upon clear danger signals in Russian behavior evident as early as 1942. In addition, the committee found that American policy toward the Soviet Union might have been different if information deliberately withheld from the public had been made available sooner.

== Declassification and release of related records ==
In September 2011, the National Archives responded to a letter to President Barack Obama by Representative Marcy Kaptur and Representative Daniel Lipinski requesting the identification, declassification and public release of all records of permanent value in the custody of the US Government relating to the events at Katyn. The National Archives via the National Declassification Center subsequently made it a priority to process and declassify all known documents related not only to the initial events of the 1940s but also to the Madden Committee and the ongoing American response. This special effort has led to the declassification of over a thousand pages not previously released to the public, and the launch of a project to highlight Katyn material declassified by the National Archives over the previous few decades.
