= Katyn Commission =

1943 commission to investigate the Katyn massacre

International Katyn Commission
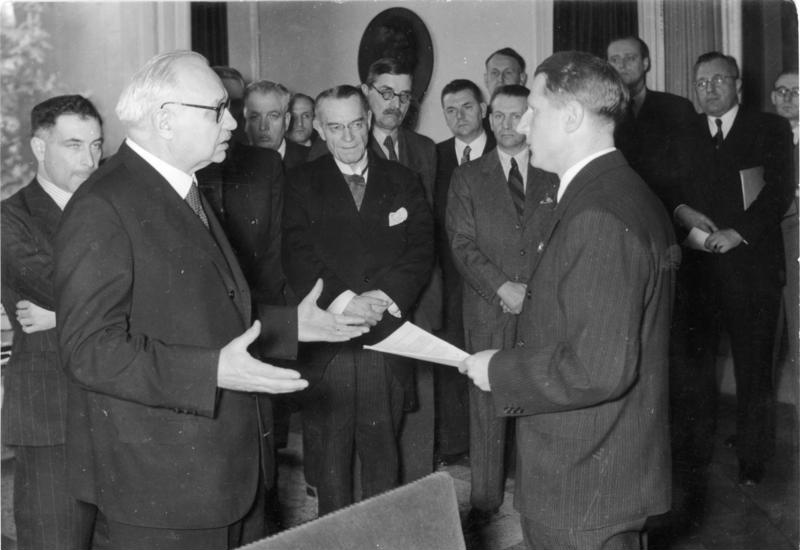
- Leonardo Conti, Reich Health Leader, (right) holds the Report of the International Katyn Commission, 4 May 1943, in front of Dr. Ferenc Orsós from the University of Budapest. Centre, Professor Louis Speleers of the Ghent University in Belgium. Eduard Miloslavić, Croatian professor of pathology, is the 4th person from left
- Date: April and May 1943
- Location: Katyn, Kalinin and Kharkiv
- Also known as: Katyn Commission
- Cause: Mass murder

The Katyn Commission or the International Katyn Commission was a committee formed in April 1943 under request by Germany to investigate the Katyn massacre of some 22,000 Polish nationals during the Soviet occupation of Eastern Poland, mostly prisoners of war from the invasion of Poland including Polish Army officers, intelligentsia, civil servants, priests, police officers and numerous other professionals. Their bodies were discovered in a series of large mass graves in the forest near Smolensk in Russia following Operation Barbarossa.

An international commission of experts in anatomy and forensic pathology were brought in from 11 countries in Europe, predominantly from Nazi Germany's allied or occupied states. The Commission concluded that the Soviet Union had been responsible for the massacre. Consequently, the German government made extensive reference to the massacre in its own propaganda in an attempt to drive a political wedge between the Allies of World War II. The severing of relations between the Polish government-in-exile and the Soviet Union was a direct result of Polish support for the investigation.

The Soviets denied their responsibility for the crime immediately, and their Extraordinary State Commission was tasked with falsifying documents and forensic science in order to reverse the blame and charged Germany with the crime.

== Members ==
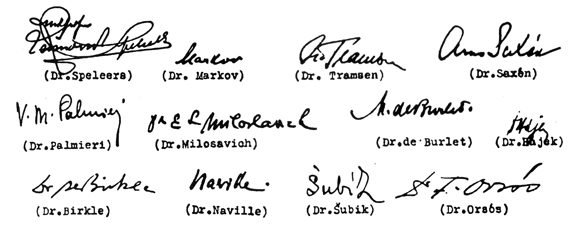
Signatures of the members of the Commission

- Alexandru Birkle, Romanian doctor of medicine
- Herman Maximilien de Burlet, Dutch anatomist, embryologist, physiologist and pathologist
- František Hájek, Czech professor of forensic medicine
- Marko Markow, Bulgarian professor of forensic medicine
- Eduard Miloslavić, Croatian professor of pathology
- Professor François Naville from University of Geneva
- Dr. Ferenc Orsós from the University of Budapest
- Vincenzo Mario Palmieri, Italian professor of forensic medicine, University of Naples
- Arno Saxén, Finnish pathologist, professor of the Helsinki University
- Professor Reimond Speleers of the Ghent University in Belgium
- Helge Tramsen, Danish expert in forensic medicine
- Andrej Žarnov (František Šubík), Slovak professor of pathological anatomy

== Russian admission of the Soviet crime ==
The Soviet documents pertaining to the massacre started being declassified only in 1990. They proved conclusively that 21,857 Polish internees and prisoners of war were executed by the Soviet Union after 3 April 1940, including 14,552 prisoners from the three largest Soviet POW camps at this time. Of the total number of victims, 4,421 officers were executed by shooting at the camp in the former Optina Monastery near Kozelsk; 3,820 at the camp in a former convent in Starobelsk; and 6,311 at the former monastery on Stolobny Island near Ostashkov; in addition 7,305 Poles were secretly executed in Byelorussian SSR and Ukrainian SSR prisons. Among the victims were 14 Polish general officers – Leon Billewicz, Bronisław Bohaterewicz, Xawery Czernicki (admiral), Stanisław Haller, Aleksander Kowalewski, Henryk Minkiewicz, Kazimierz Orlik-Łukoski, Konstanty Plisowski, Rudolf Prich (murdered in Lviv), Franciszek Sikorski, Leonard Skierski, Piotr Skuratowicz, Mieczysław Smorawiński and Alojzy Wir-Konas (promoted posthumously).

In November 2010, the Russian State Duma admitted in an official declaration that Joseph Stalin and Soviet officials ordered the Soviet NKVD secret police under Lavrentiy Beria to commit the massacres.
