= Grudziądz Fortress =

System of forts in the area of Grudziądz, Poland

- Twierdza Grudziądz
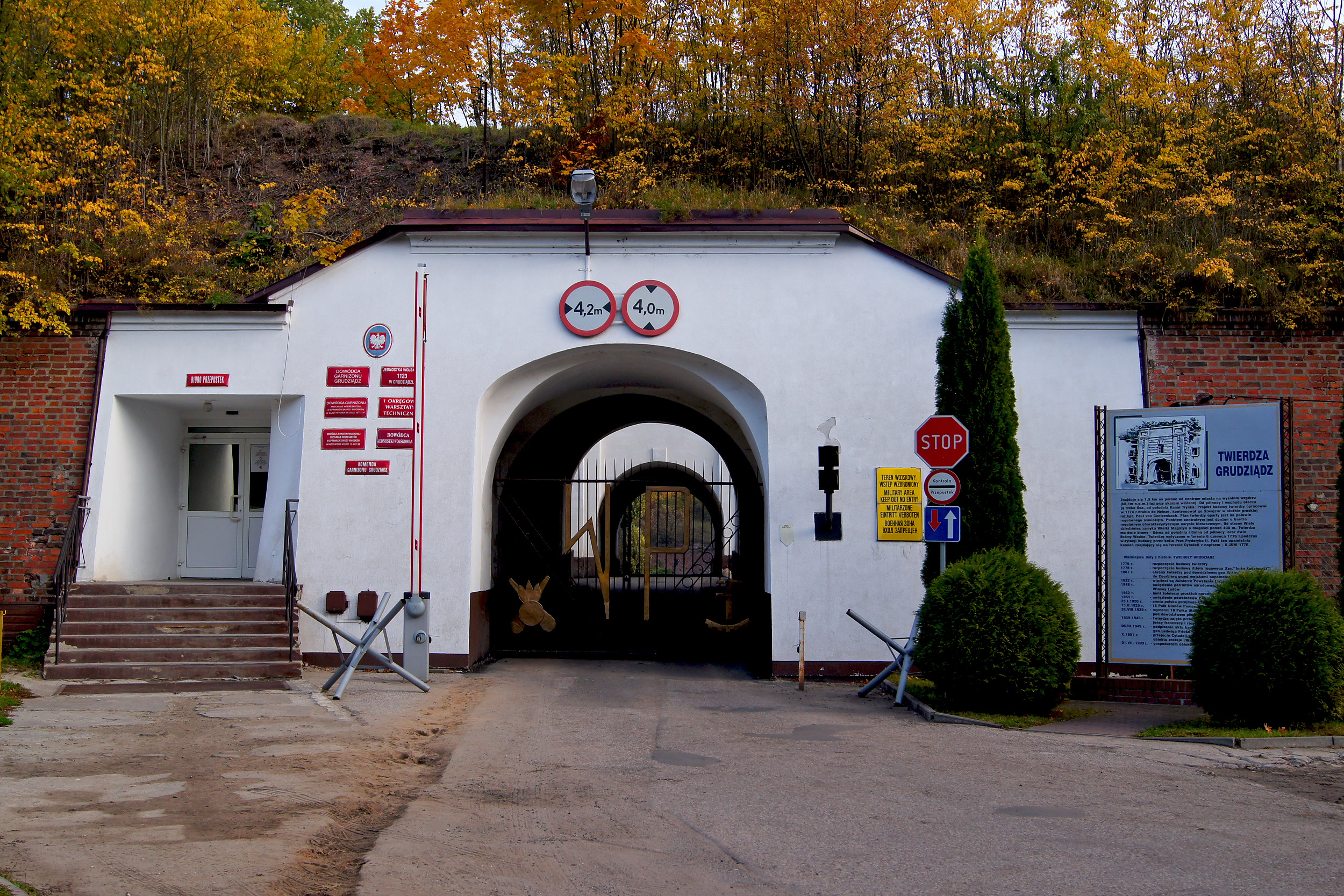
- Citadel in Grudziądz (gate from Czwartaków Street)
- Interactive map of the Grudziądz Fortress area

General information
- Type: Fortress
- Architectural style: Neoclassical
- Location: Grudziądz, Poland
- Coordinates: 53°30′50″N 18°45′40″E
- Construction started: June 6, 1776
- Completed: 1789
- Renovated: 1946–1948
- Destroyed: 1945
- Owner: Imperial German Army; 35th Division (German Empire), 18th Pomeranian Uhlan Regiment, Wehrmacht; Grudziądz Garrison (currently)

Grudziądz Fortress or Fort Grudziądz is a system of forts, mainly from the 19th century, located in the area of Grudziądz and surrounding villages in northern Poland.

Its central point is the Citadel, known by Germans as Courbière's Fortress (German: Feste Courbiere) – a stronghold in the northern part of the city, the construction of which began on 6 June 1776, on the order of King Frederick the Great of Prussia. Other forts were built at the turn of the 19th and 20th centuries. The purpose of the fortress was to defend Grudziądz and the strategic bridge over the Vistula river in case of Russian attacks.

Most of the fortifications were only used in 1806, 1807, and 1945. Many of them, including the Citadel, have been preserved to this day in good condition. Fragments of the fortifications are accessible to visitors.

== Location and construction of the Citadel ==
After the First Partition of Poland, Grudziądz fell within the borders of Prussia. There arose the need to secure the lower Vistula to protect the communication lines between Gdańsk Pomerania and Prussian lands on the right bank of the Vistula, especially since the fortresses in Gdańsk and Toruń were not yet in Prussian hands. The fortress was built on a vast plateau 1.5 km north of the city center, at the highest point of the Vistula escarpment (68.1 m above sea level, 60 meters above the level of the Vistula). It is surrounded on the north and east by the Osa river, and on the south by the Trynka Canal. Paul von Gontzenbach, who had previously worked on the construction of the fortress in Srebrna Góra in Silesia, is considered the designer, with the construction project personally corrected by King Frederick II.

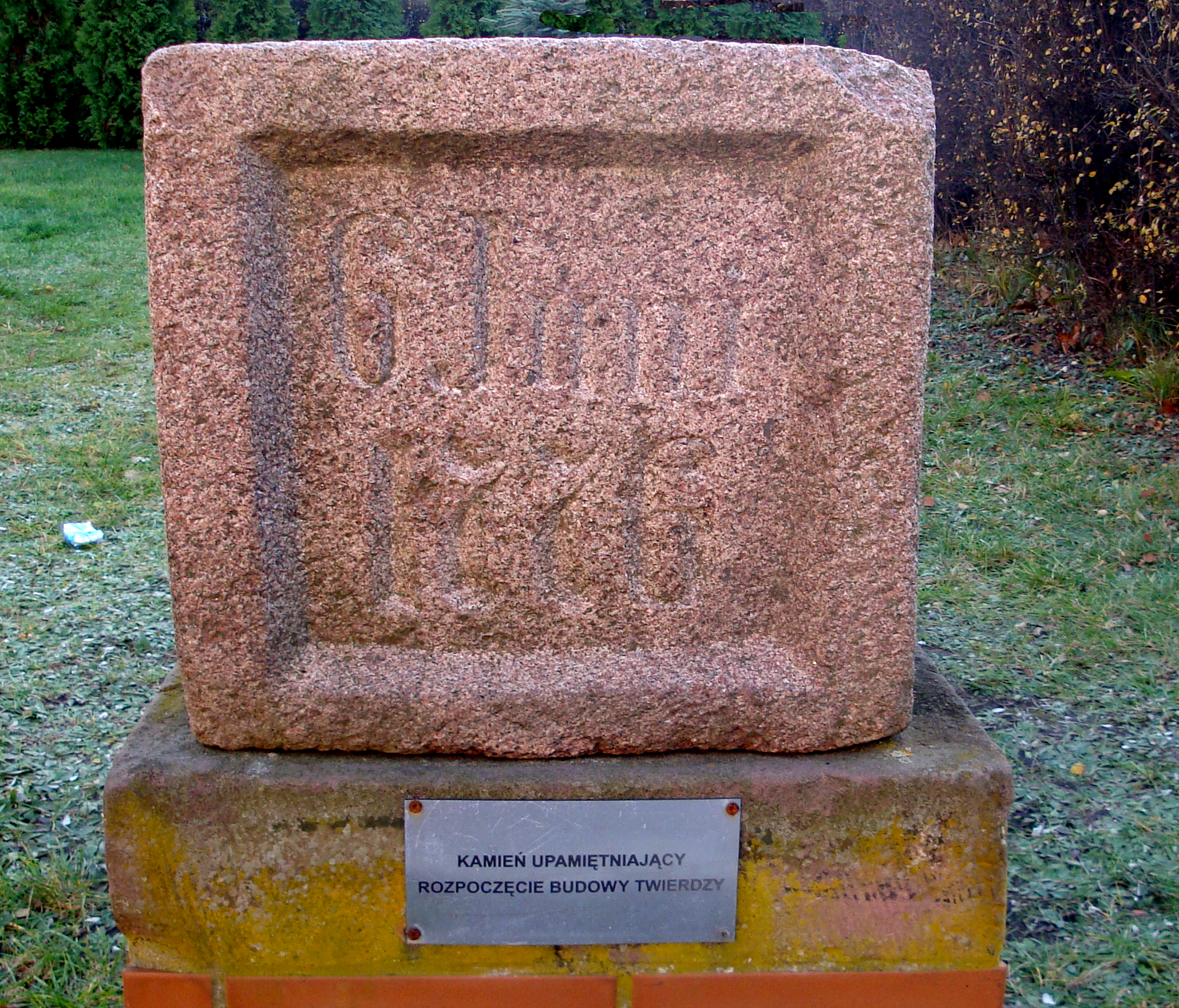
Stone commemorating the beginning of the Citadel's construction

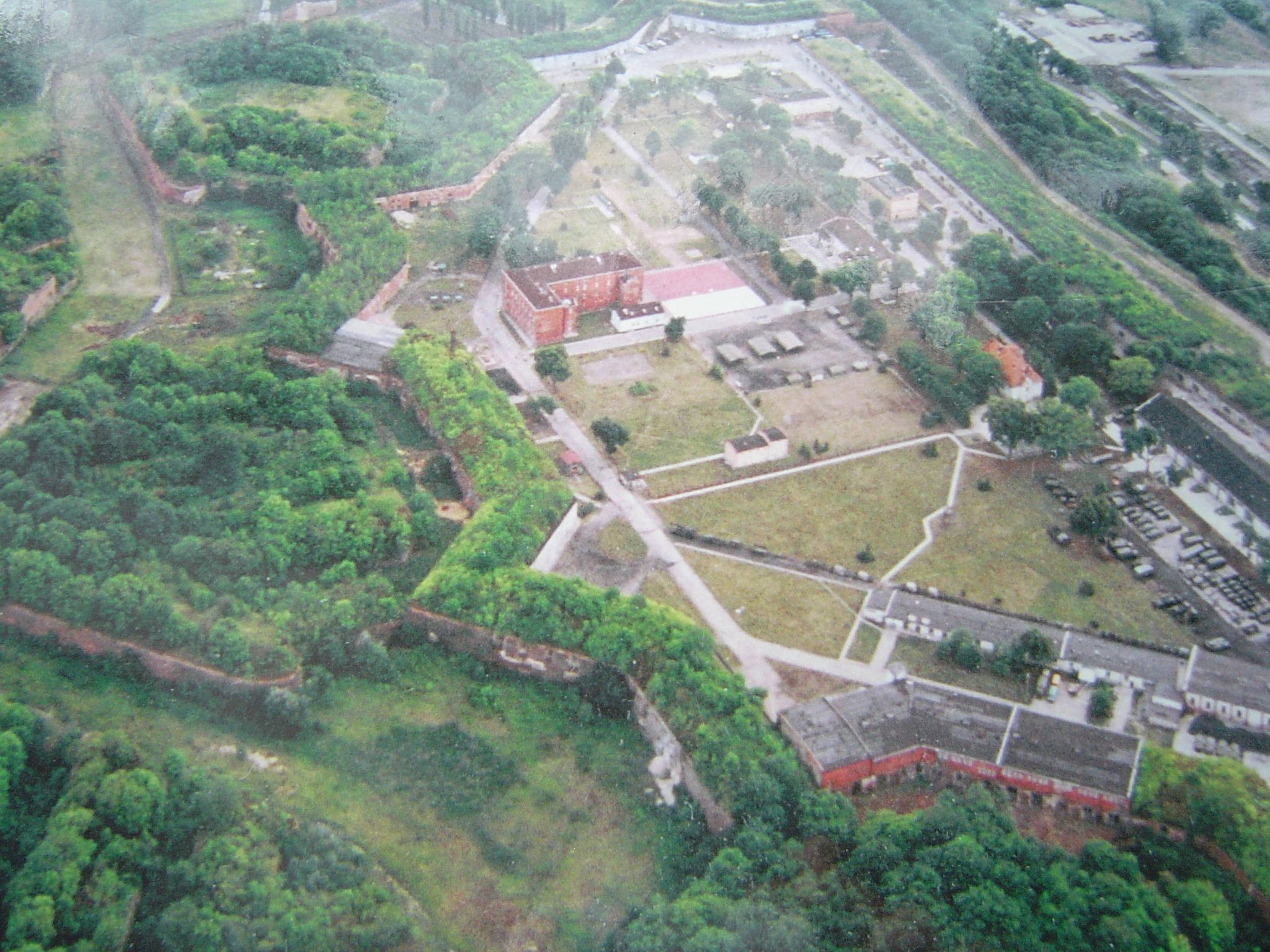
Citadel from a bird's eye view

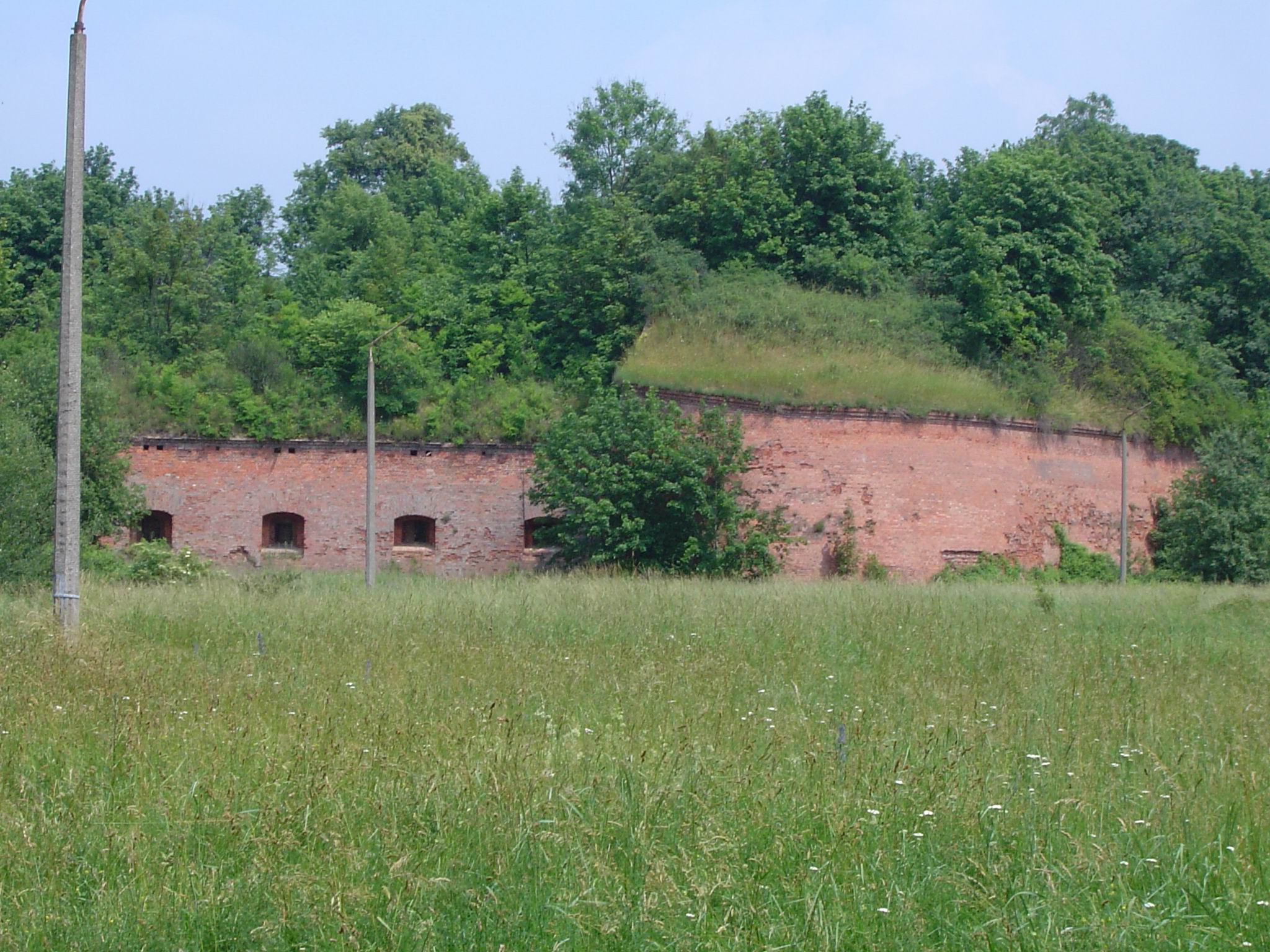
Citadel in Grudziądz (artillery holes by the dry moat)

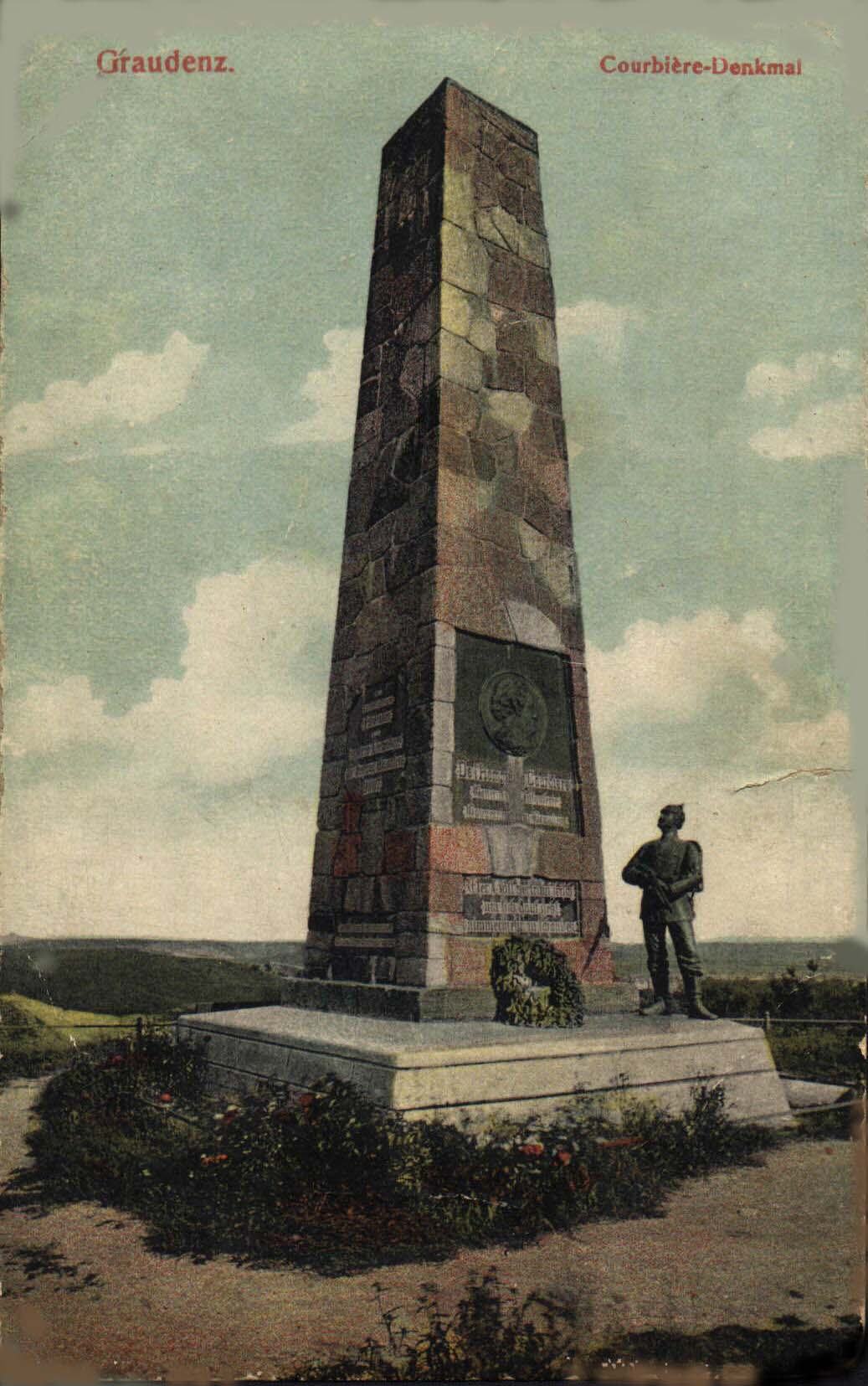
The now defunct Courbière monument in the Grudziądz Fortress

Construction began on 6 June 1776, commemorated by a stone on the bergfried, and work progressed rapidly at the beginning of August. Von Gontzenbach had a sufficient supply of building materials and, most importantly, well-trained craftsmen and laborers at his disposal. Miners were brought in for digging underground tunnels. In June 1776, there were 6,918 people working on the fortress construction (besides carters), including 367 masons. The construction was supposed to last four years, but the fortress was not yet ready by 1782 due to several reasons. In 1780, there was a shortage of bricks. At that time, old Teutonic castles in Rogóźno and Grudziądz were dismantled for the needs of the fortress, and the foundations of both sides of Bastion I were built with stone. The constantly growing demand for bricks (11 million were used for the fortress construction, with a total of 608,400 m³ of masonry work) could only be met by the fortress's own brickworks. Therefore, the brickworks located south of the fortress were expanded, and 180 bricklayers were brought in, mostly from Prussia. In 1821, the brickworks were further enlarged, and new kilns were installed, but by the mid-19th century, it was already inactive. There were also technical difficulties in setting up terraces and ramps on the Vistula escarpment – numerous springs and streams flowing from the mountain made the work challenging. Additionally, some buildings had to be founded deeper than originally planned. According to von Gontzenbach's estimate, the construction of the fortress was to cost about 1,800,000 thalers. However, this estimate quickly proved unrealistic, even though construction of some of the previously planned anti-mine tunnels, designed to destroy siege works, was abandoned. Of the planned length of 56,400 meters, only 1,246 meters of tunnels were realized, and demolition mines were also laid under the bastion ramparts and ravelins, which were used to blow up their own fortifications if they were occupied by the enemy. The construction of the fortress was completed in 1789, with the final cost of its construction amounting to 3,671,146 thalers.

== The period of the Napoleonic wars ==
The appearance of a patrol of Napoleon's army in Dragacz on 15 November 1806 caused panic in Grudziądz. Frederick William III and his wife hastily left the city, heading northeast.

Wilhelm René de l'Homme de Courbière, the governor of Grudziądz, was preparing to defend the fortress. At the beginning of the campaign, he had a garrison consisting of two battalions and two companies. By the end of 1806, the Prussian forces were augmented by three infantry battalions and one squadron of hussars, and additionally, the Citadel had strong artillery (154 cannons, 35 howitzers, and 16 mortars). In total, General Courbière had a garrison of 5,808 soldiers under his command, but it was not a homogeneous force – a significant portion consisted of Poles, Lithuanians, Ruthenians, and even Scots; this ethnic diversity caused significant problems for the Citadel's command.

The first encounter with the French forces took place on 4 December 1806, in Mniszek, after which there were no contacts with the enemy for a month.

=== Siege of 1807 ===
At the beginning of January 1807, a unit of Polish insurgents led by Major Dominik Dziewanowski appeared on the left bank of the Vistula. They camped in Dragacz and began patrolling the Vistula's bank, but did not engage in any aggressive actions against the Prussians. In mid-January, the Hessian-Darmstadt Brigade arrived near Grudziądz and almost immediately launched an assault on the city. The Prussian forces defended only the northern edge of Grudziądz with a unit of 400 men and two cannons. The Prussians quickly ceased resistance and withdrew towards the Citadel, occupying field fortifications located nearby.

At the end of January, a company of infantry under the command of Captain Jan Barankiewicz appeared near Grudziądz, occupying Wielki Lubień. This unit served as a cover for the Polish forces under General Jan Henryk Dąbrowski. The appearance of Polish troops caused trouble for the Citadel's command, as Polish soldiers from the garrison began to desert. Sources mention the desertion of a non-commissioned officer and eight soldiers.

After Russia entered the war and achieved temporary successes in East Prussia, the forces of the Grande Armée withdrew from the conquered territory. Although they returned near Grudziądz the next day, the city remained in the hands of the Prussians.

The desertions from the Prussian units were exacerbated by the arrival of the Polish 11th Infantry Regiment in Wielki Lubień, commanded by Colonel Józef Wasilewski with a force of 1,600 men. Soon, other Polish units began to gather in the vicinity of the city. Preparations for the assault slowly began. Supported by Hessian battalions, the Poles captured Grudziądz on February 11. However, the attempt to capture the Citadel itself failed. After February 12, the Legion of Kalisz under General Józef Zajączek arrived near Grudziądz. This marked the beginning of the proper blockade of the fortress. One battalion from the 2nd Polish Infantry Regiment of the Duchy of Warsaw and the first battalion from the 4th Infantry Regiment of the Duchy of Warsaw participated in the blockade.

The besieging forces were still too weak and practically devoid of artillery, so a direct assault was not feasible. They limited themselves to sporadic artillery duels. During one of these duels, the city itself suffered damage, including possibly the Klimek Tower on Castle Hill.

Even before the arrival of spring in 1807, epidemics began to break out among the combatants. Over 700 defenders died as a result. As for the attackers, there is no data available. It is only known that from the end of April to mid-May, about 200 soldiers were lost from the Polish units due to various reasons. At least some of them died as a result of the epidemics.

After the fall of Gdańsk, siege artillery was brought to Grudziądz, and intense preparations for the assault began. A rampart was started to be constructed from the northeast side of the Citadel, where cannons were to be placed. On June 27, the construction of another, closer rampart began. Three days later, just before the commencement of the general assault, a ceasefire was declared. The siege was halted upon news of the armistice following the Battle of Friedland (June 14), due to negotiations preparing for the Treaties of Tilsit. Under the Treaties of Tilsit, the areas of Grudziądz north of the Trynka Canal remained in Prussian hands. Grudziądz was one of the few Prussian fortresses that were not captured by the Napoleonic army.

=== After the Congress of Vienna ===
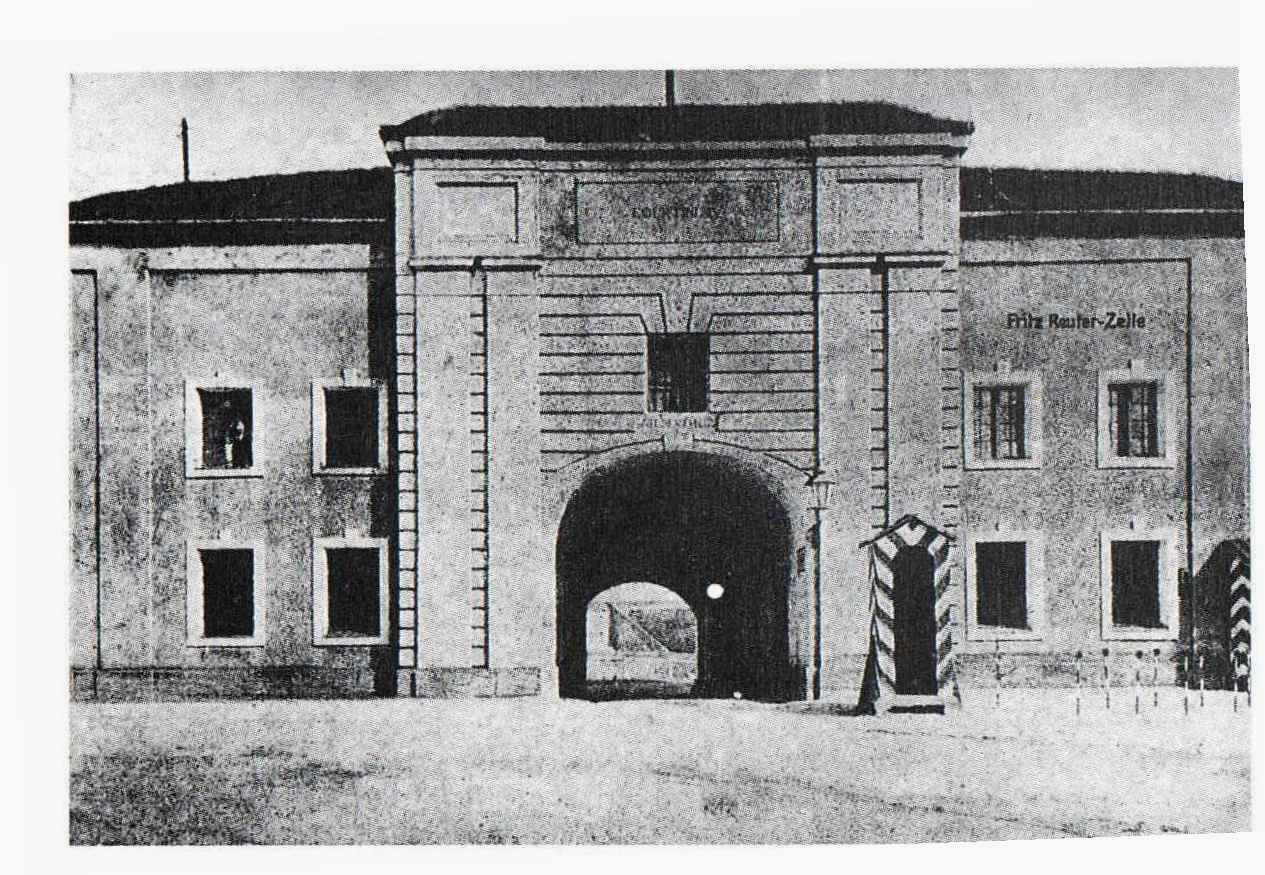
Citadel in Grudziądz (turn of the century)

After the Napoleonic Wars, the Prussians did not undertake significant expansion works on the fortifications. Over time, the condition of the structures tended to degrade, especially in terms of defensive capabilities (some lunettes and certain ravelins were eliminated). The Citadel mainly served as barracks and warehouses, as well as a prison for political prisoners and a place of internment for Polish troops after the November Uprising, including Colonel Edmund Callier.

On 30 April 1862, a mutiny of Prussian soldiers of Polish nationality broke out under the command of Gotfryd Klatt, but it did not lead to significant consequences. In December 1870, Colonel Félix Gustave Saussier, a French prisoner of war, escaped from the citadel.

By government decision in 1872, the fortress was officially abolished. The fortification structures were used, among other things, for testing new types of cannons and ammunition. However, the function of the fortress was reinstated twice for the city: after the construction of a bridge over the Vistula river between 1876 and 1888, and on 1 September 1944, due to the approach of the Red Army.

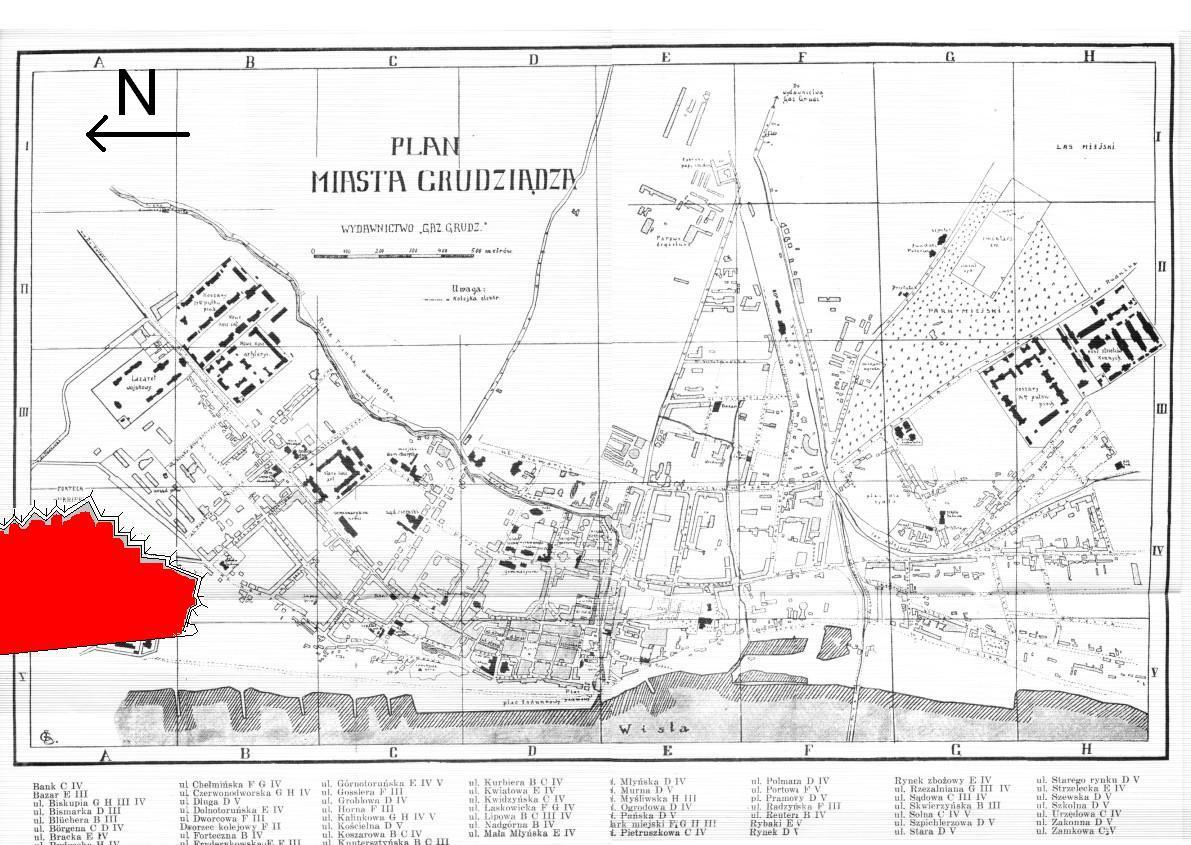
Location of the Citadel on the 1913 city plan

In Grudziądz, there was the headquarters of the 35th Division of the German Empire (which was transferred to Toruń in 1912), as well as:

- Headquarters of the 35th Cavalry Brigade (German: 35. Kavallerie-Brigade)
- 4th Mounted Rifles Regiment (German: Jäger-Regiment zu Pferde Nr. 4)
- Headquarters of the 35th Field Artillery Brigade (German: 35. Feldartillerie-Brigade)
- 71st Field Artillery Regiment Groß-Komtur (German: Feldartillerie-Regiment Nr. 71 Groß-Komtur)
- Landwehr Inspection Graudenz

== Interwar period ==
In 1919, Józef Wrycza, also known as the "priest general" (although officially holding the rank of podpolkovnik in the Polish Armed Forces), sentenced to death, was imprisoned here by the Germans.

On 23 January 1920, the fortress, along with the city, came under Polish control. In the first months after regaining independence, there was a proposal to demolish the Citadel, with the intention to employ the unemployed for the task, but it was never implemented.

From 1920 to 1939, the fortress continued to be used for military purposes, despite the development of military technology and the emergence of, among other things, airplanes. Within the walls of the Grudziądz Citadel, the 18th Pomeranian Uhlan Regiment and the 16th Field Artillery Regiment were stationed, renamed in 1931 to the 16th Pomeranian Light Artillery Regiment. There were also military warehouses (the so-called Intendance Material Depot). Some buildings were used for the needs of the Cavalry Training Center.

The administration, maintenance, and modernization of the fortress facilities were the responsibility of the Grudziądz Fortification Office. The last head of the fortifications was Major Engineer Karol Wiliński.

== World War II ==
Grudziądz fell under German control on 4 September 1939. The Germans utilized the fortress as an experimental ground and also as warehouses. However, with the Eastern Front approaching, Hitler again declared the city a fortress to be defended to the end. For this purpose, two defense lines were established in advance: external and internal, incorporating former forts of the fortress camp. The core of the resistance was to be the Citadel. Soviets and Poles grouped in units of the 2nd Belarusian Front under the command of General Pavel Batov engaged in bloody battles for the city from the end of January until 5 March 1945. In the last days of January, the Fortress was encircled from all sides by troops. On February 14, General Fricke issued an order addressed to the residents, instructing them to leave the city and go to Dragacz. Few residents complied with it. In the second half of February, Soviet forces seized the suburbs of Grudziądz. The Nazis attempted to cause extensive destruction during their retreat, but some of their attempts were thwarted by the resistance movement. In early March, Soviet troops reached the city center. In some actions, other forts of the Fortress were utilized, such as Dąb and Strzemięcin, but the Citadel itself remained a rear base for occupying forces.

Grudziądz was prepared from the beginning for an attack from the east, but the fortification system was outdated. German units were defeated and took refuge in the Citadel; however, realizing the futility of further resistance, Major General Ludwig Fricke signed the surrender document on March 6. The German troops left the Fortress in formation under the escort of Soviet soldiers. 117 officers and around 5,000 soldiers were taken prisoner. On that day, at 9:00 PM in Moscow, a twentyfold gun salute was fired to commemorate the capture of the city.

== Citadel currently ==
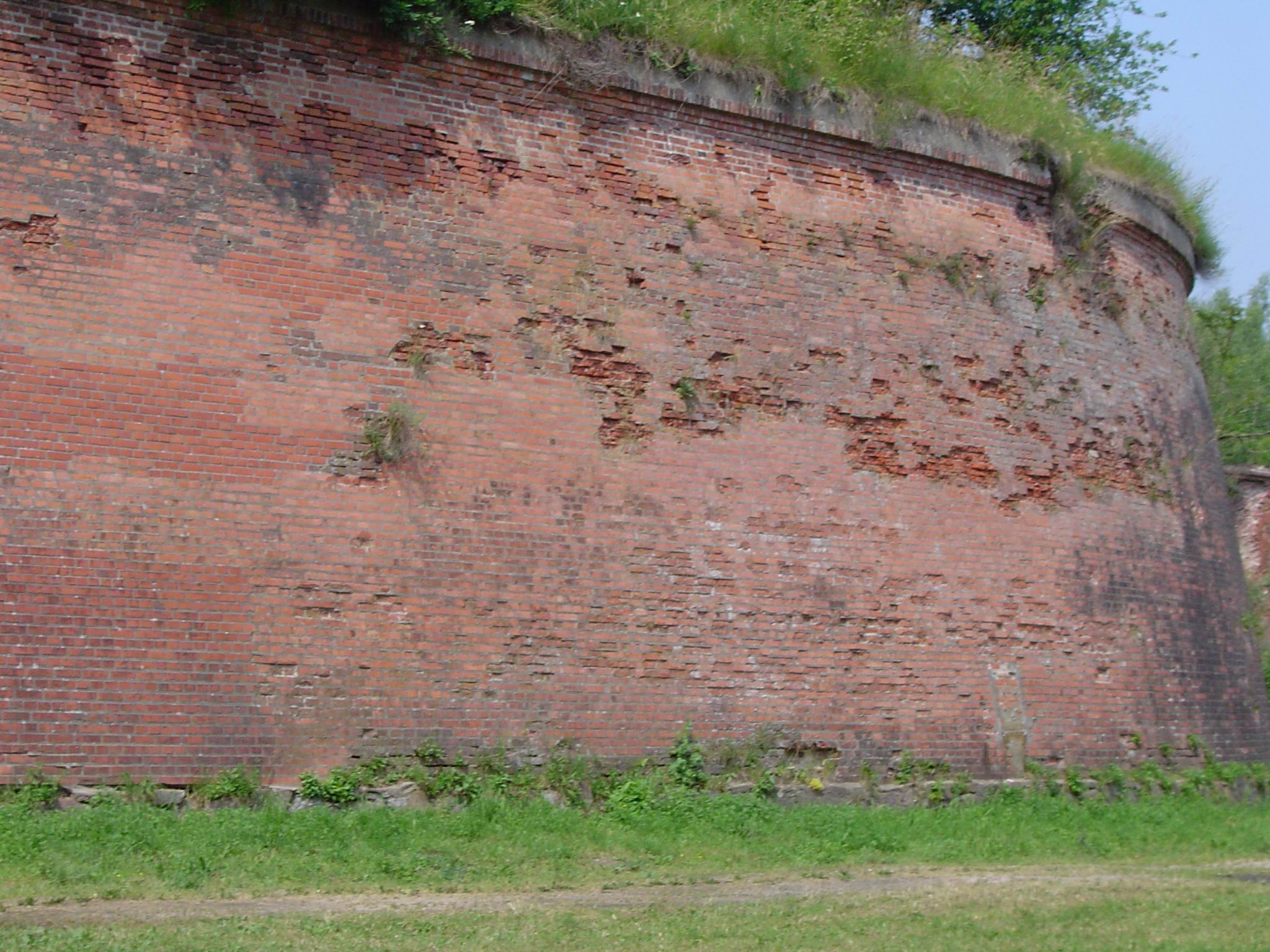
Citadel's fortifications in contemporary condition

Today, the Citadel still serves as a military facility. Several smaller units are stationed there, and military warehouses are located on its premises. From the old fortress, the bergfried with its full circuit of walls and casemates has been preserved, along with both gates and one of the four ramps. Within the bergfried, the best-preserved and most characteristic feature is the two-story Great Warehouse, as well as the neoclassical former commandant's building located in the middle of the courtyard. Also, all five bastions, four ravelins, the footpath encircling the fortress in the counterscarp, and the countermine footpaths have been preserved, although in varying conditions. However, the former lunettes no longer exist. The dry moat is still in quite good condition. In some unused footpaths, approximately 1,000 bats have found shelter. The Citadel can be visited with prior permission from the military authorities or freely on selected days of the year (so-called "Open Days of the Citadel," e.g., November 11 or May 3). Since June 2011, the facility has been managed by the Military Unit 4503. Guided tours of the Citadel are conducted by guides from the Military Cultural and Educational Association "RAWELIN".

=== Trail through the fortifications ===
At the end of August 2007, a hiking and cycling trail leading to the most important fortifications was established. The route encircles Grudziądz, starting from Fort Strzemięcin and the adjacent shelter IR9, passing through Fort Lasek Miejski, the Anti-Tank Battery Leśny Dwór, Księże Góry, a shelter on Kasztanowa Street, Fort Tarpno, Świerkocin, Nowa Wieś, and Parski. The trail ends at the Citadel at the Rogowy Bastion. It was inaugurated on 2 September 2007, with the "To the Courbière's Citadel" cycling rally, which was attended by over 160 people. Guides from the Society of Friends of Fortifications led participants to the most significant fortification monuments, including the underground tunnels of the Citadel.

== Hornwork of the Citadel ==
A mighty structure built between 1788 and 1789 according to the design by Paweł von Gontzenbach. It constituted the so-called outer work of the Citadel, projecting towards the city. It also strengthened the defense of the Upper Gate approach with flanking fire. The core of the structure was the actual hornwork, consisting of two demi-bastions. Beyond the inner moat rose a mighty artillery traverse of the first defense section. Communication with the Citadel was ensured by a communication line – a covered road. The entire structure was surrounded by a moat, a scarp wall, a covered road, and a fighting slope. The network of anti-mine tunnels was significantly expanded. The Rogowy Bastion was partially blown up for brick salvage after World War II. However, numerous noteworthy objects and long stretches of underground tunnels have survived. The site is open to visitors, but caution is advised. Located between the present-day streets of Czwartaków, Saperów, and Jagiełły.

== Other fortifications of the fortress ==
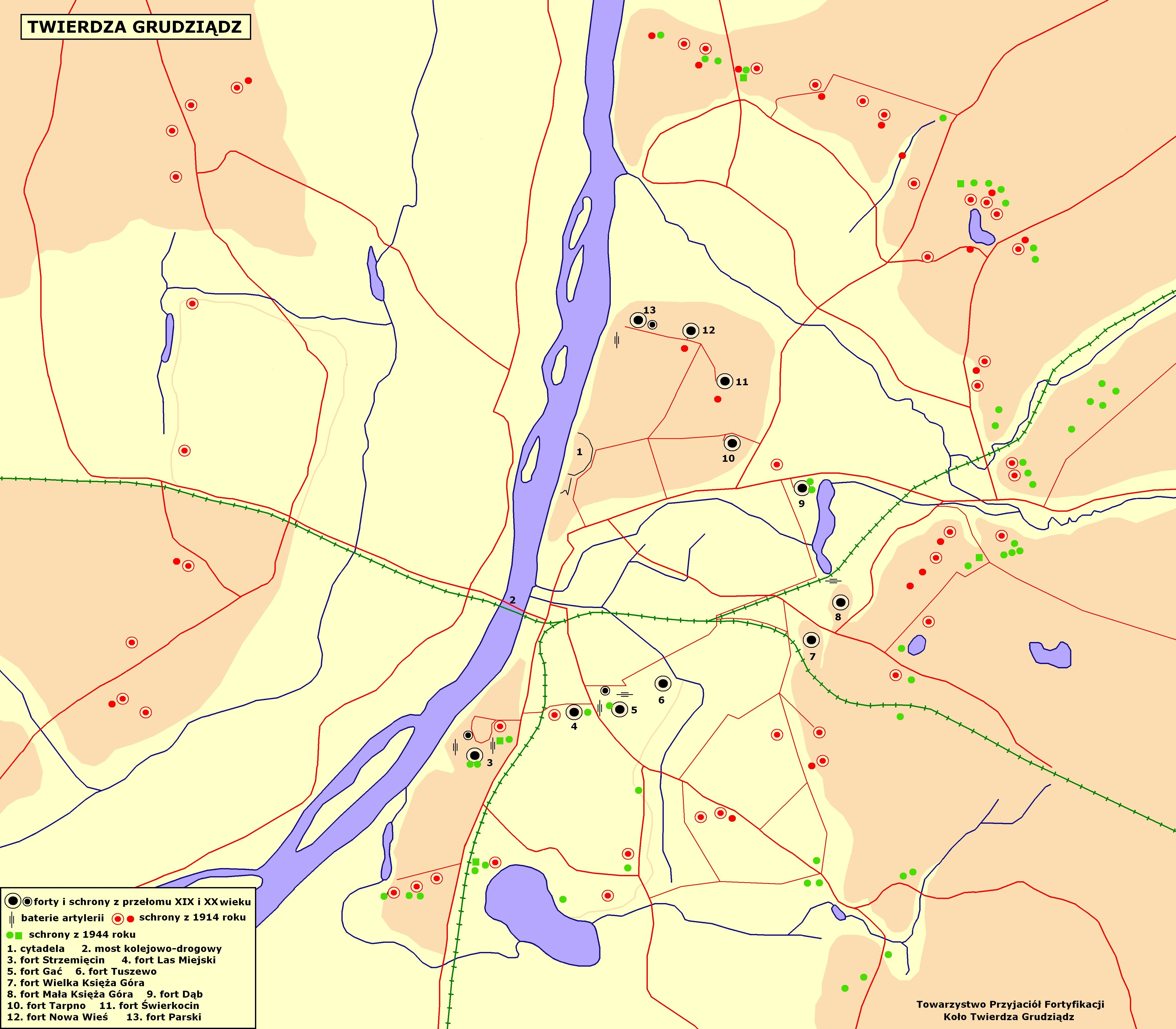
- Plan of the fortress
  Fort Dąb
- Fortifications of Kępa Forteczna
  - Fort Tarpno
  - Fort Świerkocin
  - Fort Nowa Wieś
  - Fort Parski
  - North Battery
- Fort Lesser Księża Góra
- Fort Greater Księża Góra
- Fort Strzemięcin
- Southern Front Nizinny
  - Fort Gać
  - Fort Lasek Miejski
  - Fort Tuszewo
  - Half-track Battery Leśny Dwór

=== Fort Dąb ===
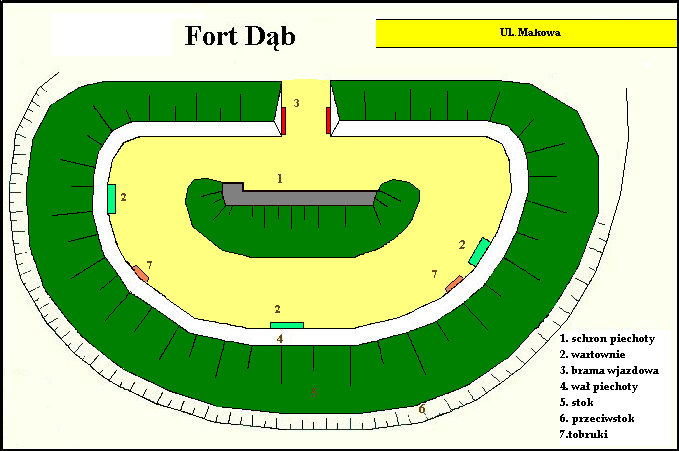
Fort Dąb

Fort Dąb was the last infantry fort constructed before the outbreak of World War I (around 1907). It filled the gap between Księża Góra and Kępa Forteczna and served as protection for the entrance to the city from the Olsztyn side. Situated directly behind Tarpno Lake and the initial section of Trynka Street (currently Makowa Street), the infantry shelter had a reinforced concrete structure, albeit weaker compared to previously built shelters. Its simple architecture resembled shelters from the World War I period. The fort's rampart housed three guardhouses with vaults reinforced with corrugated iron. In 1944, two Tobruk-type bunkers were also placed in the fort's rampart.

The fort's condition is good, and it is open for visitors. The main shelter is in good condition but lacks steel doors and shutters. Unlike other shelters in the inner ring, it was adapted for self-defense, with a latrine protruding in front of the facade to create a sort of caponier. The firing slits for frontal fire also protected the entrances to the shelter. The guardhouses are in good condition, with some retaining their corrugated iron vaults. The open space of the courtyard is filled with short sections of free-standing embankments.

During the battles of Grudziądz in 1945, the fort served as an artillery concentration point for the northern sector of the city's defense and was used by the Germans in heavy fighting in this part of the city as a frontline resistance point.

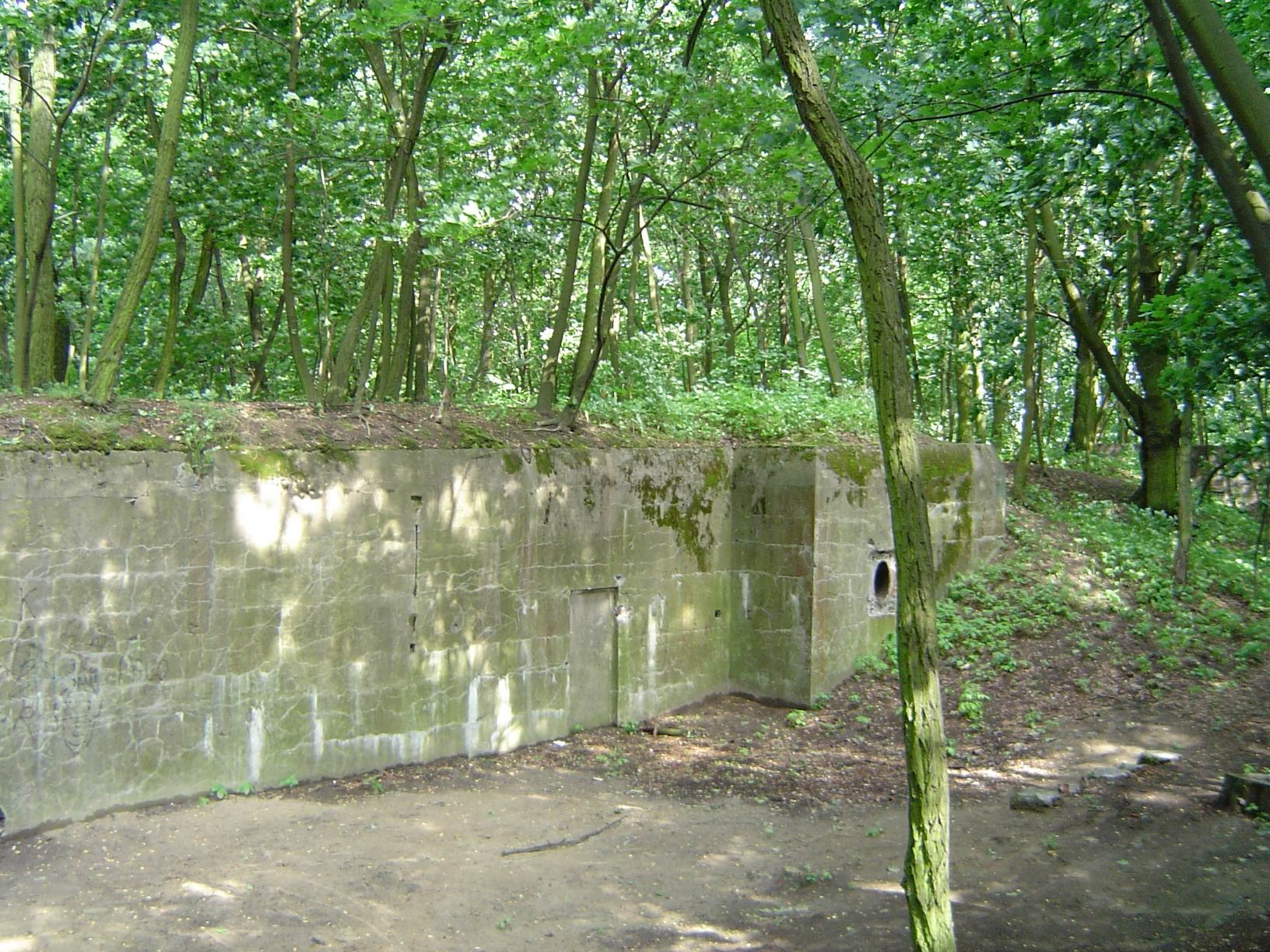
Main bunker of Fort Dąb

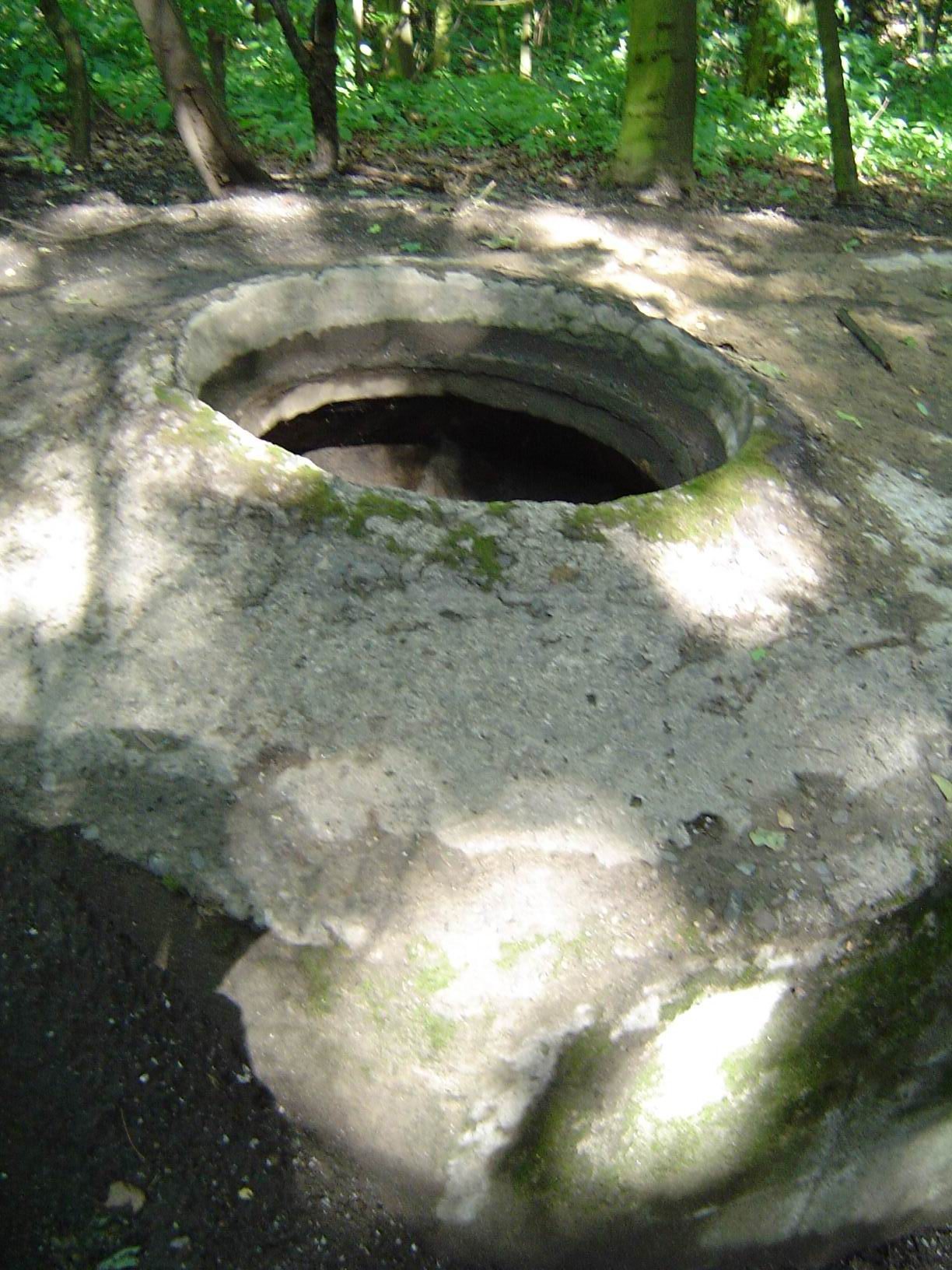
Tobruk in the Fort Dąb area

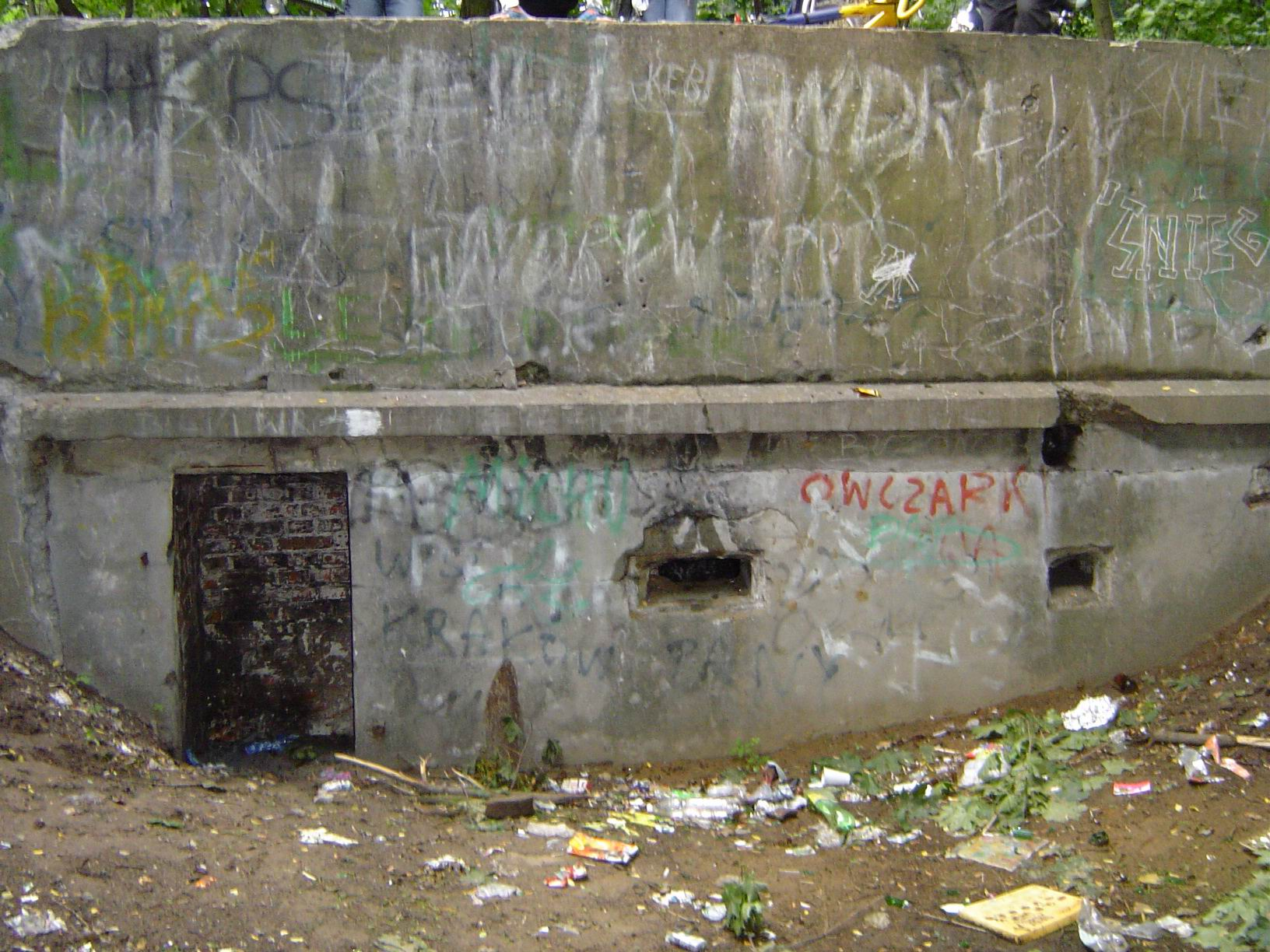
The fort's central guardhouse

=== Fortifications of Kępa Forteczna ===
==== Fort Tarpno ====
Located beyond the intersection of roads leading to Olsztyn and Malbork, near Klonowa Street and close to allotment gardens, lies Fort Tarpno. The structure is well-preserved and was built between 1896 and 1898 to protect the strategic junction of roads to Malbork and Olsztyn. The barrack shelter is secured by a formidable 3-meter concrete vault. The earthen ramparts with four guardhouses (each intended for 12 soldiers) are only minimally damaged by encroaching plots. Inside the ramparts stands the barracks shelter, worth visiting due to its minimal degree of devastation, with bossages around the door and window openings. Architecturally, this shelter resembles Fort Lasek Miejski.

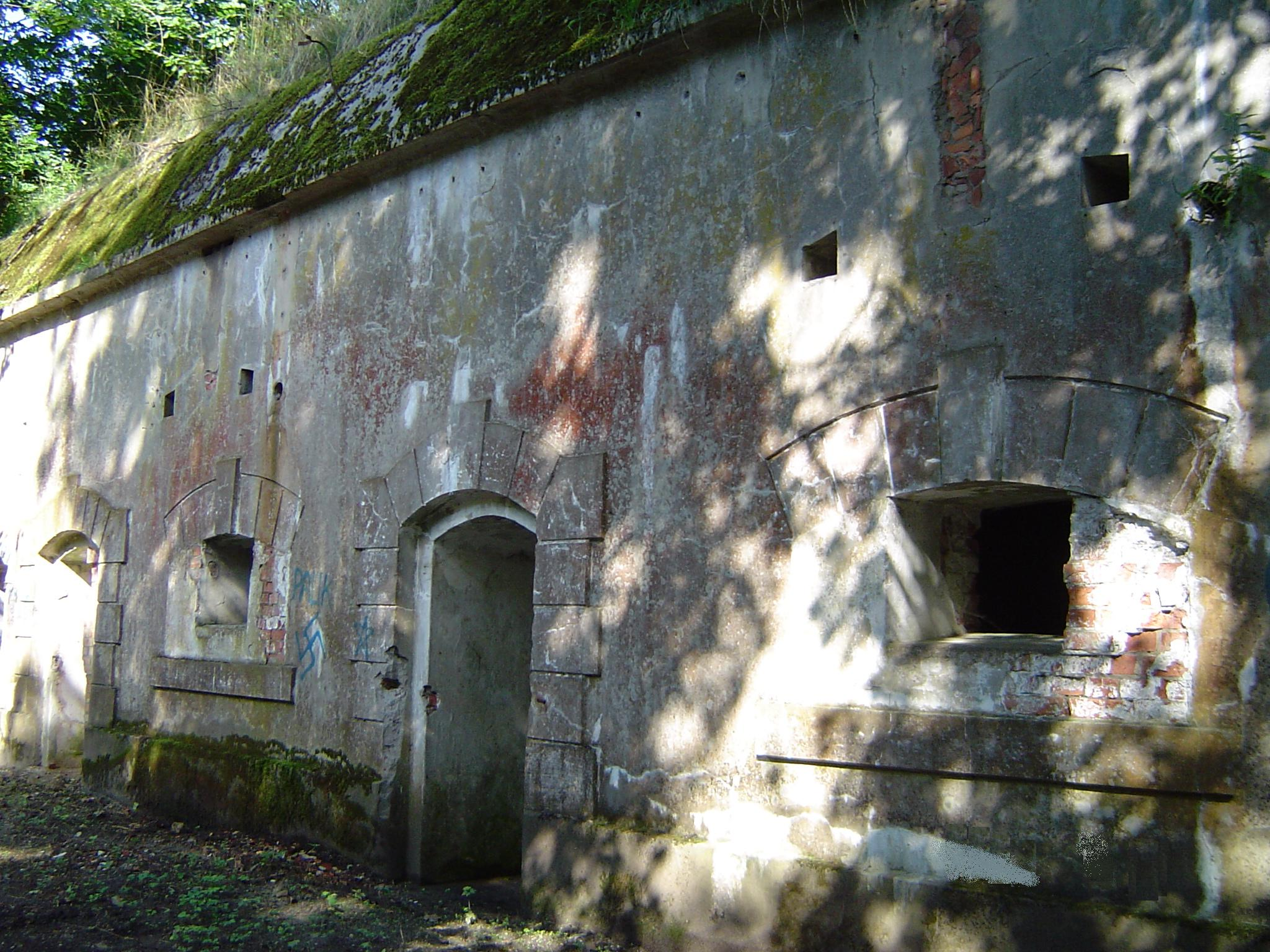
Main bunker, visible decorative elements

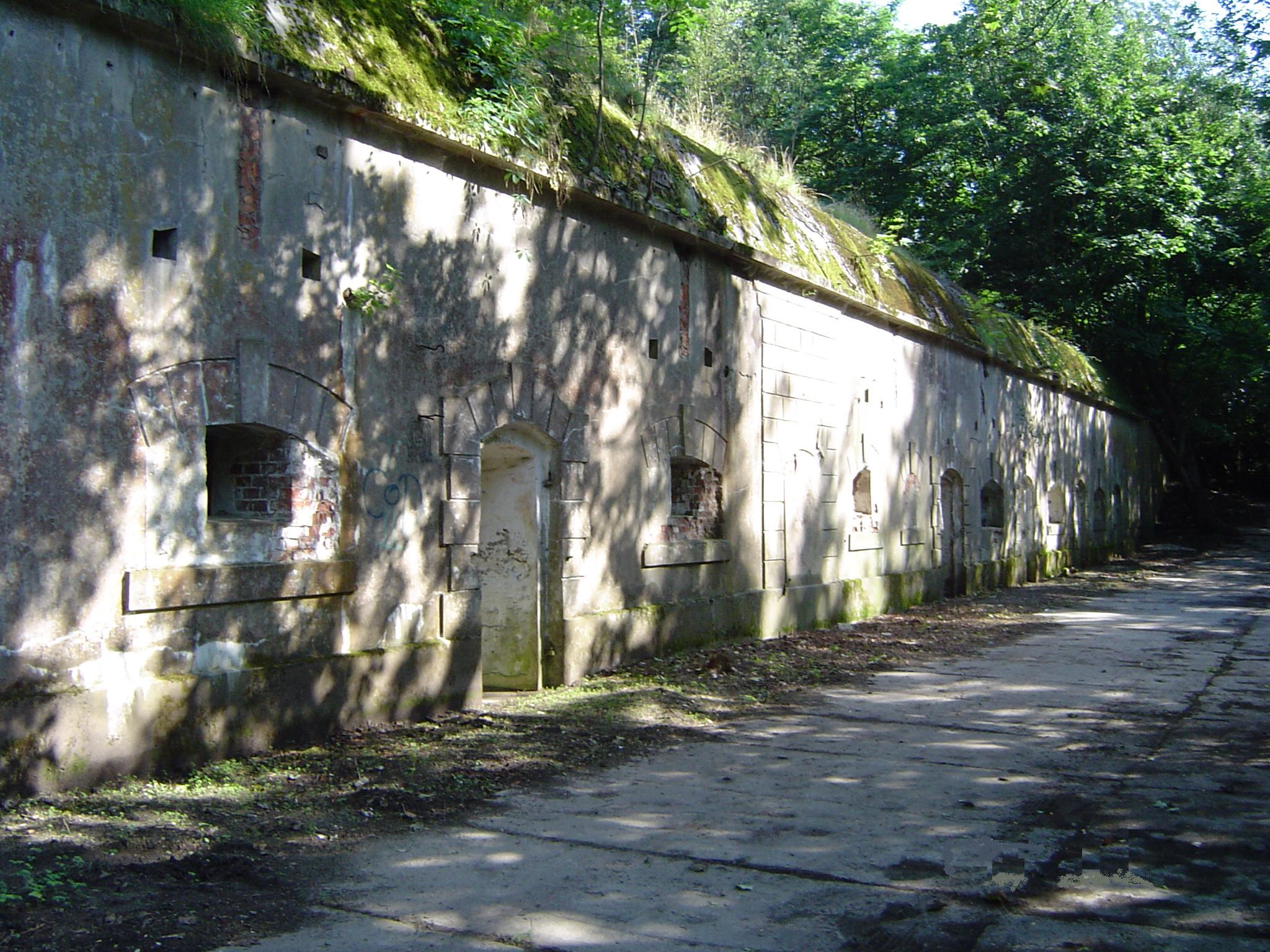
Main bunker

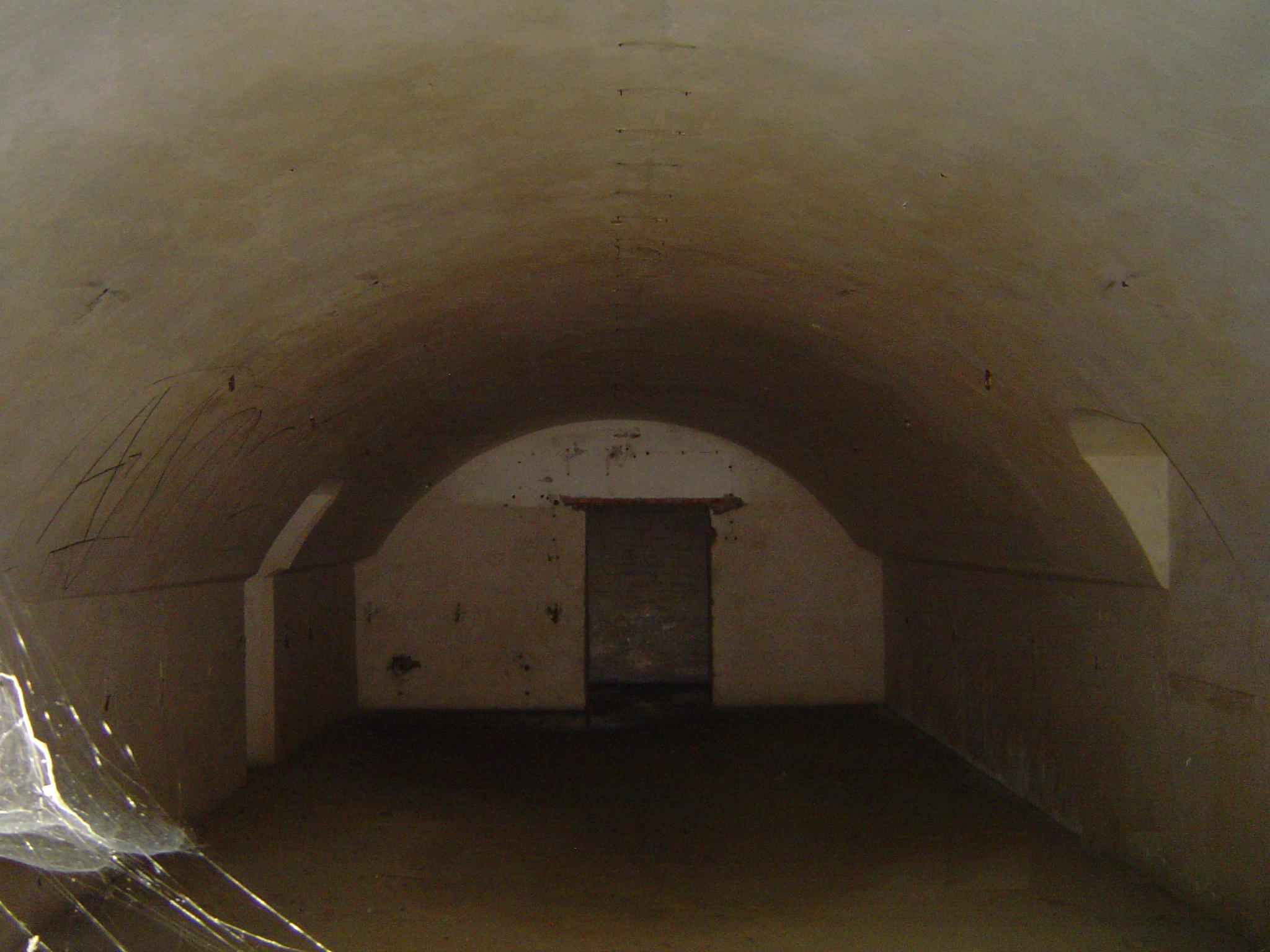
The inside of the main bunker

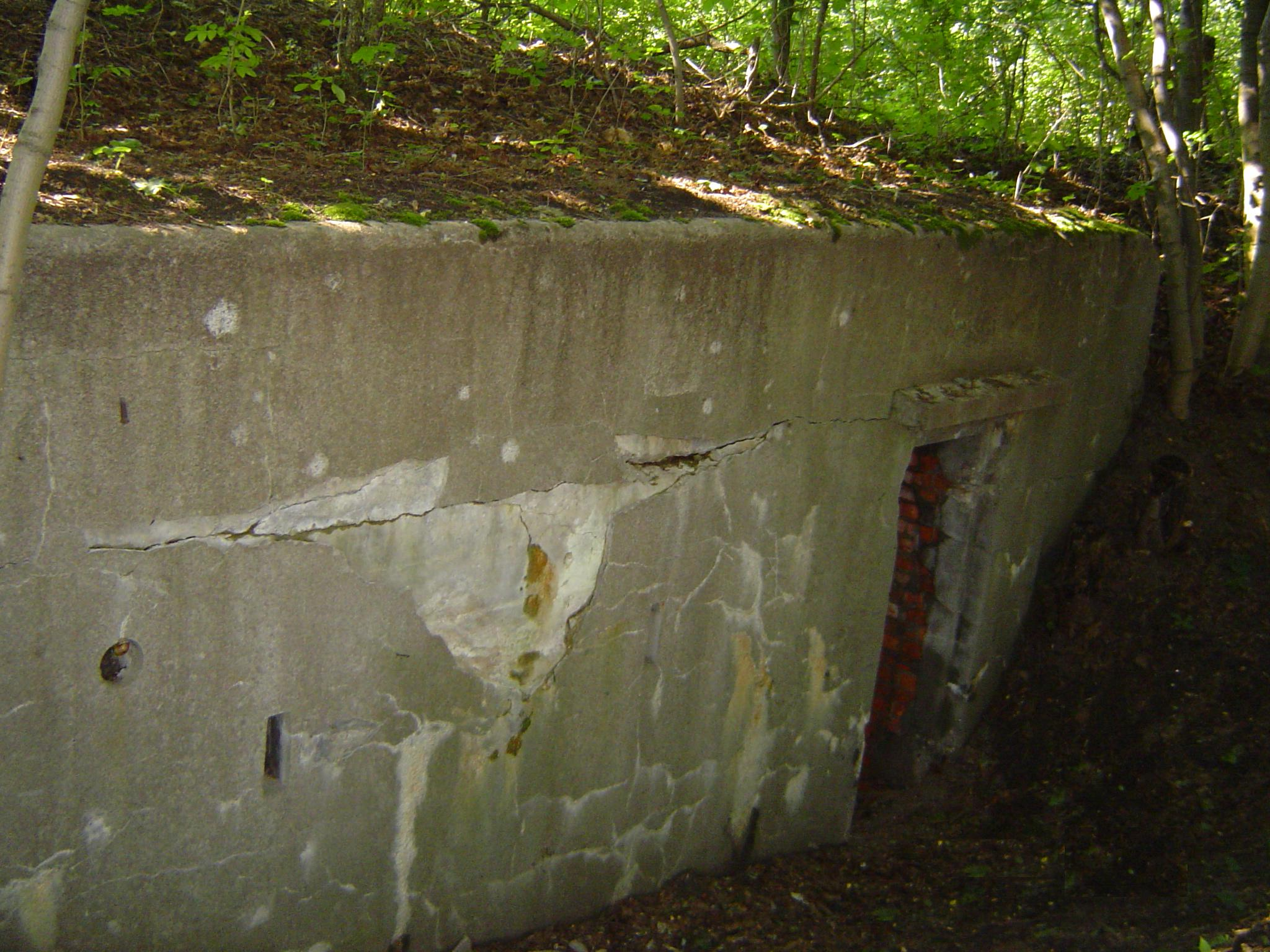
Guardhouse

==== Fort Świerkocin ====
Built between 1900 and 1902, this fort features a barracks shelter with slightly weaker construction compared to Fort Tarpno. The concrete-reinforced walls were 1.75 meters thick. It is surrounded by four guardhouses, including three reinforced with corrugated steel against splinters. A characteristic feature of the fort is the rear rampart consisting of short, oval sections of embankments. Well-preserved and located near the border of Nowa Wieś and Świerkocin, access is from Świerkocińska Street.

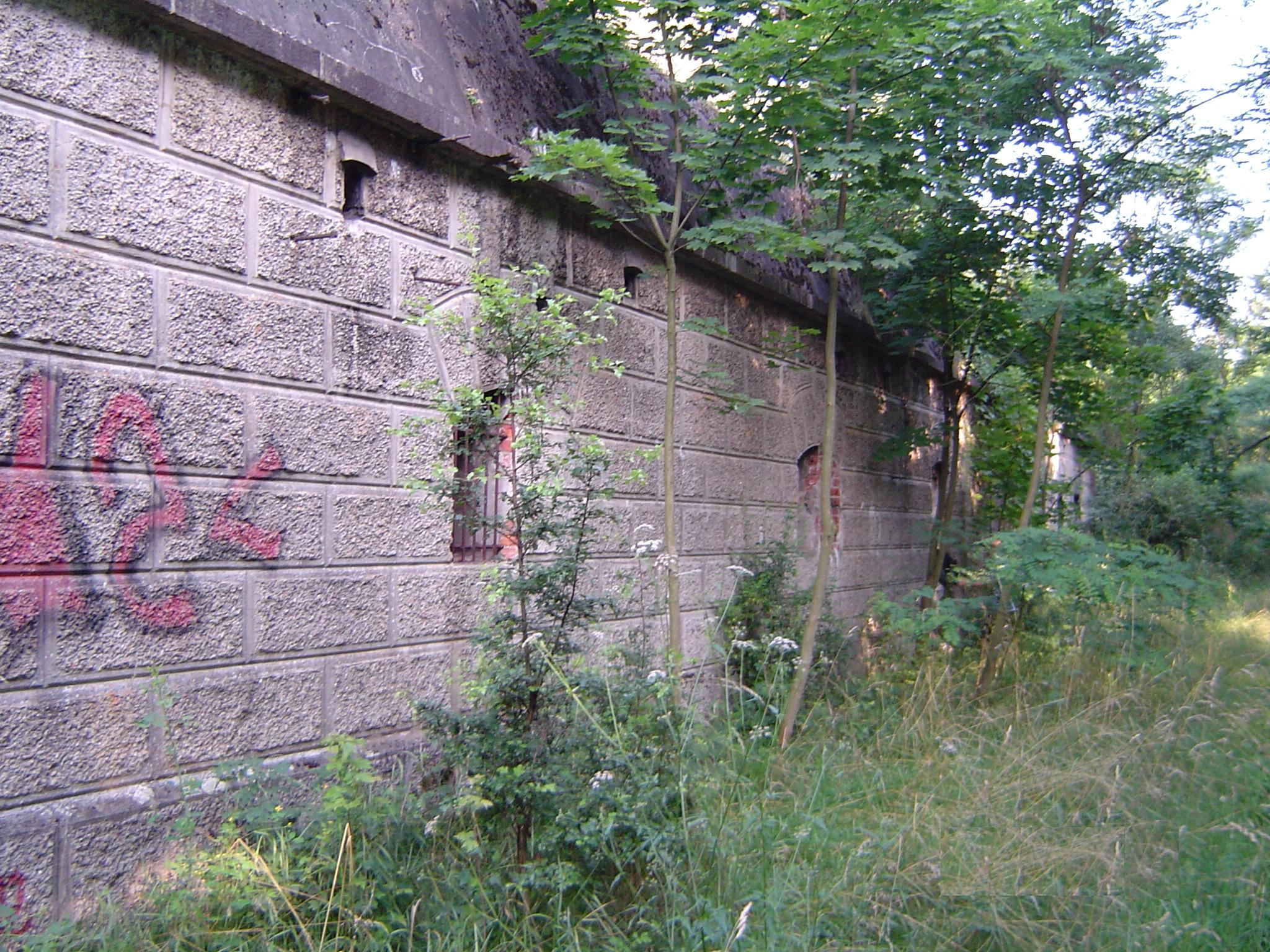
Fort Świerkocin – main bunker

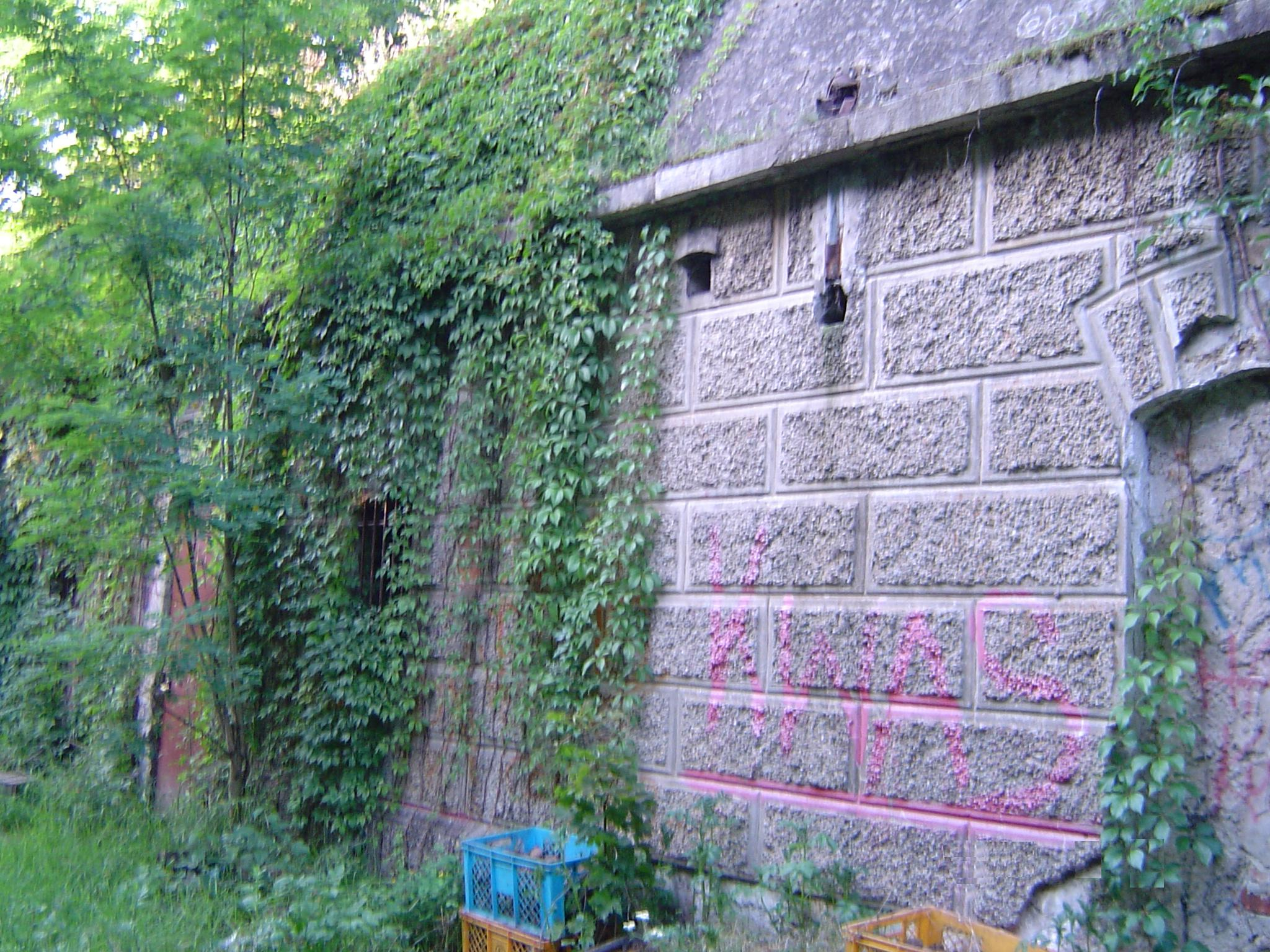
Main bunker – view of the utility room located in it

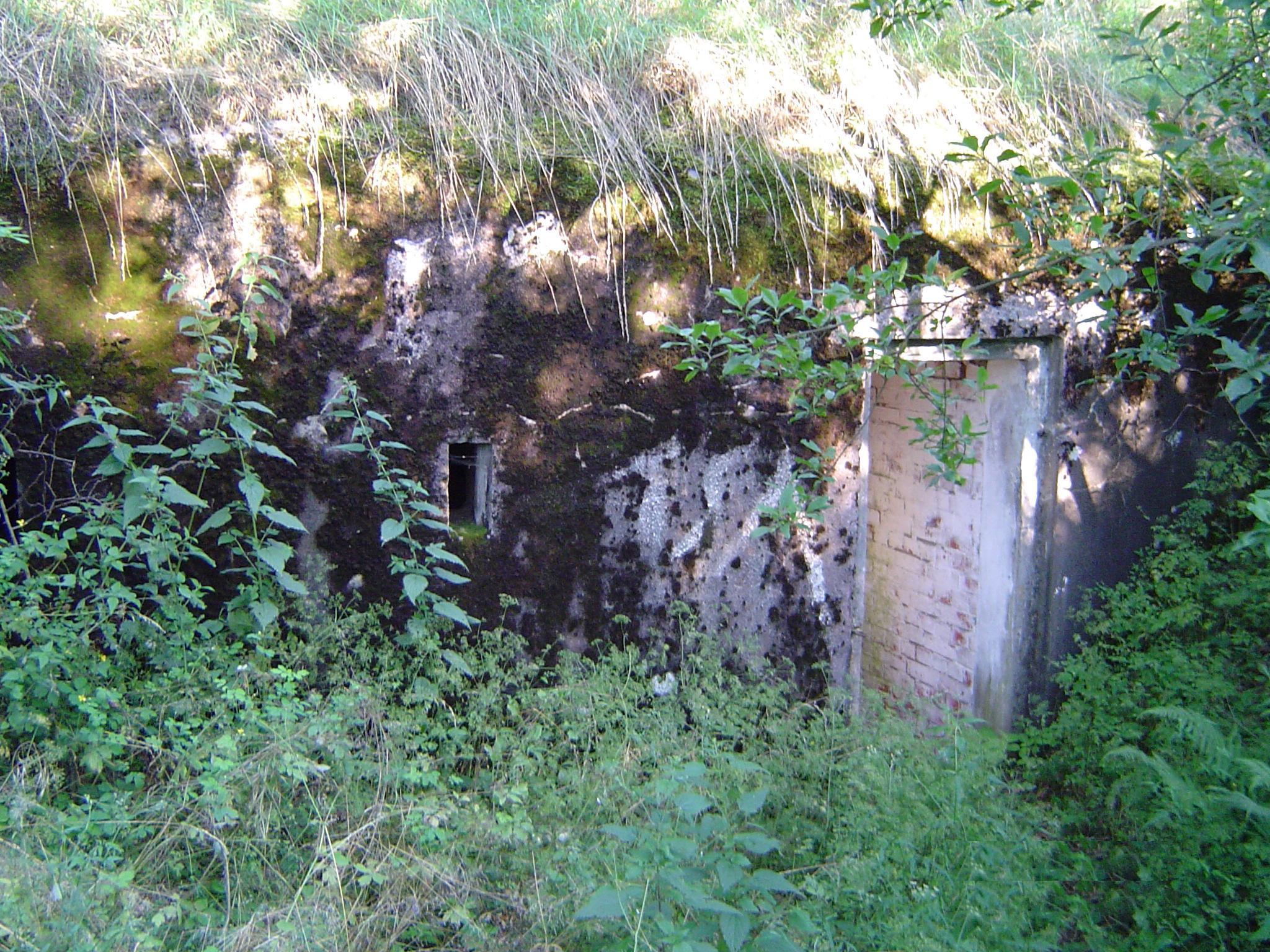
One of the guardhouses

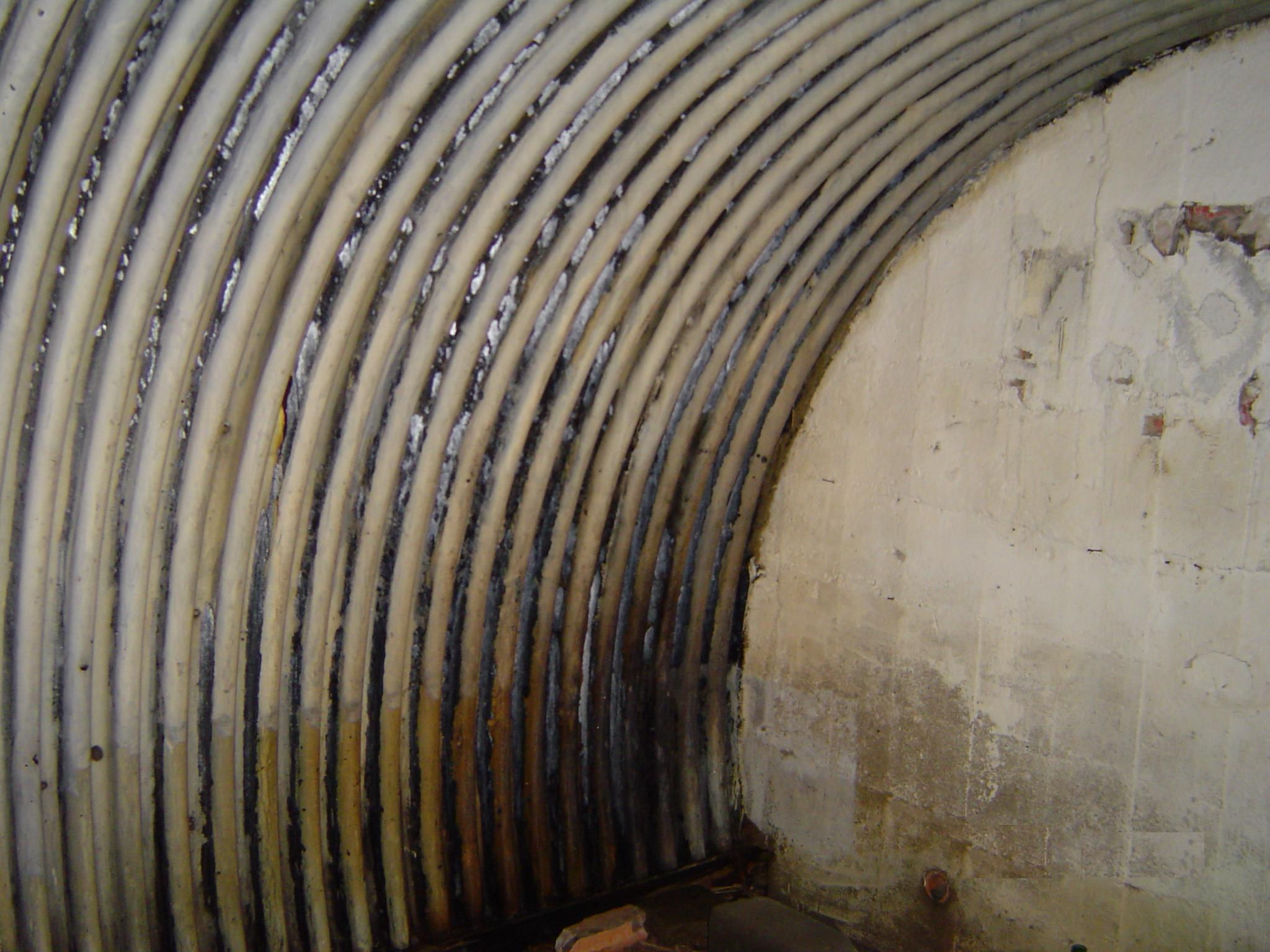
Preserved corrugated sheet metal on the ceiling of one of the guardhouses

==== Fort Nowa Wieś ====
The fort built between 1900 and 1902 is architecturally identical to Fort Świerkocin and also has a rear rampart. Despite some damage, part of the main shelter has remained in fairly good condition. Inside, one can find equipment elements from the time of construction, such as the base for a diesel generator and inscriptions on the walls in German. The fort is located in Nowa Wieś near Grudziądz, on Leśna Street.

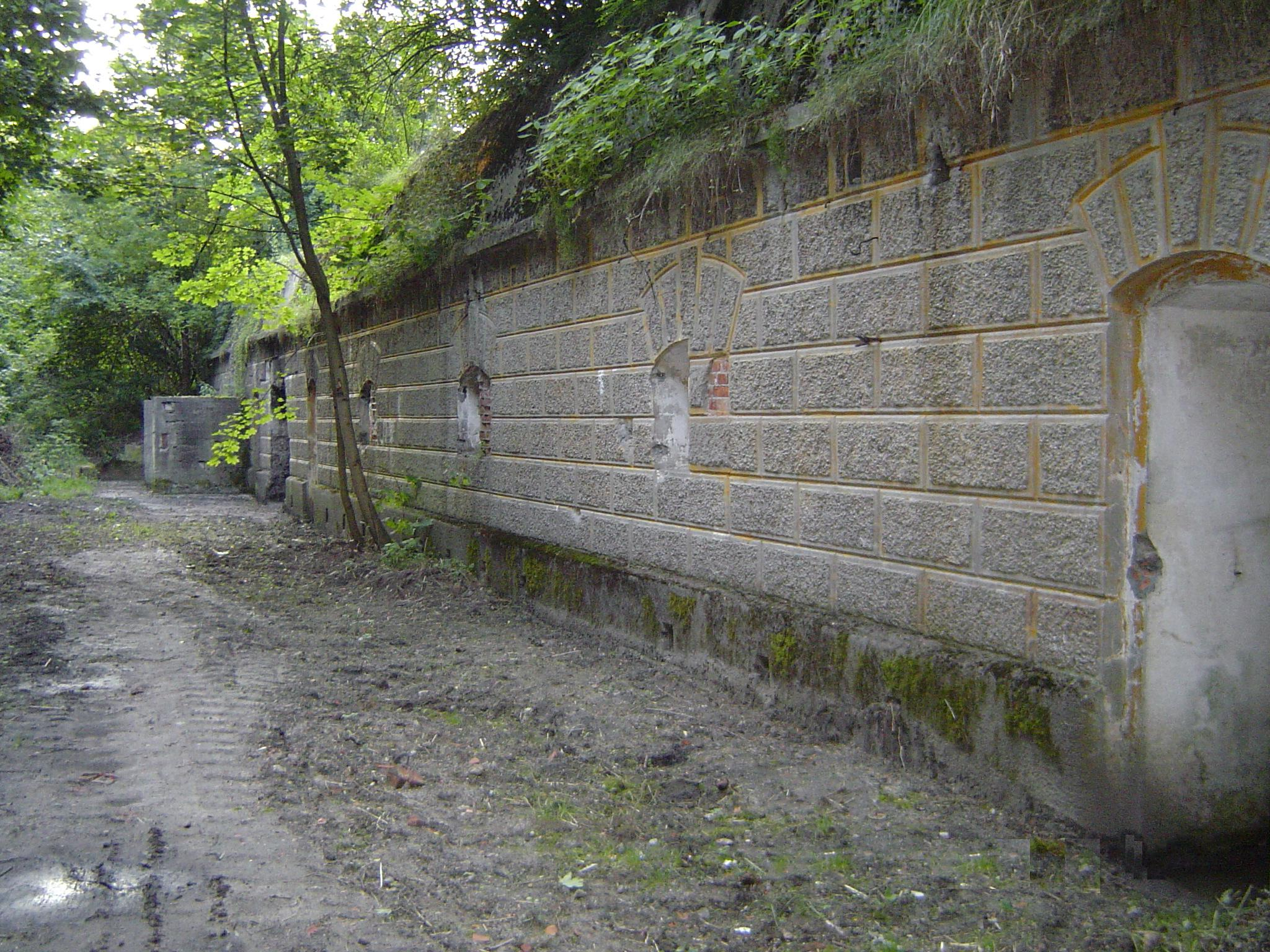
The outside of the main bunker

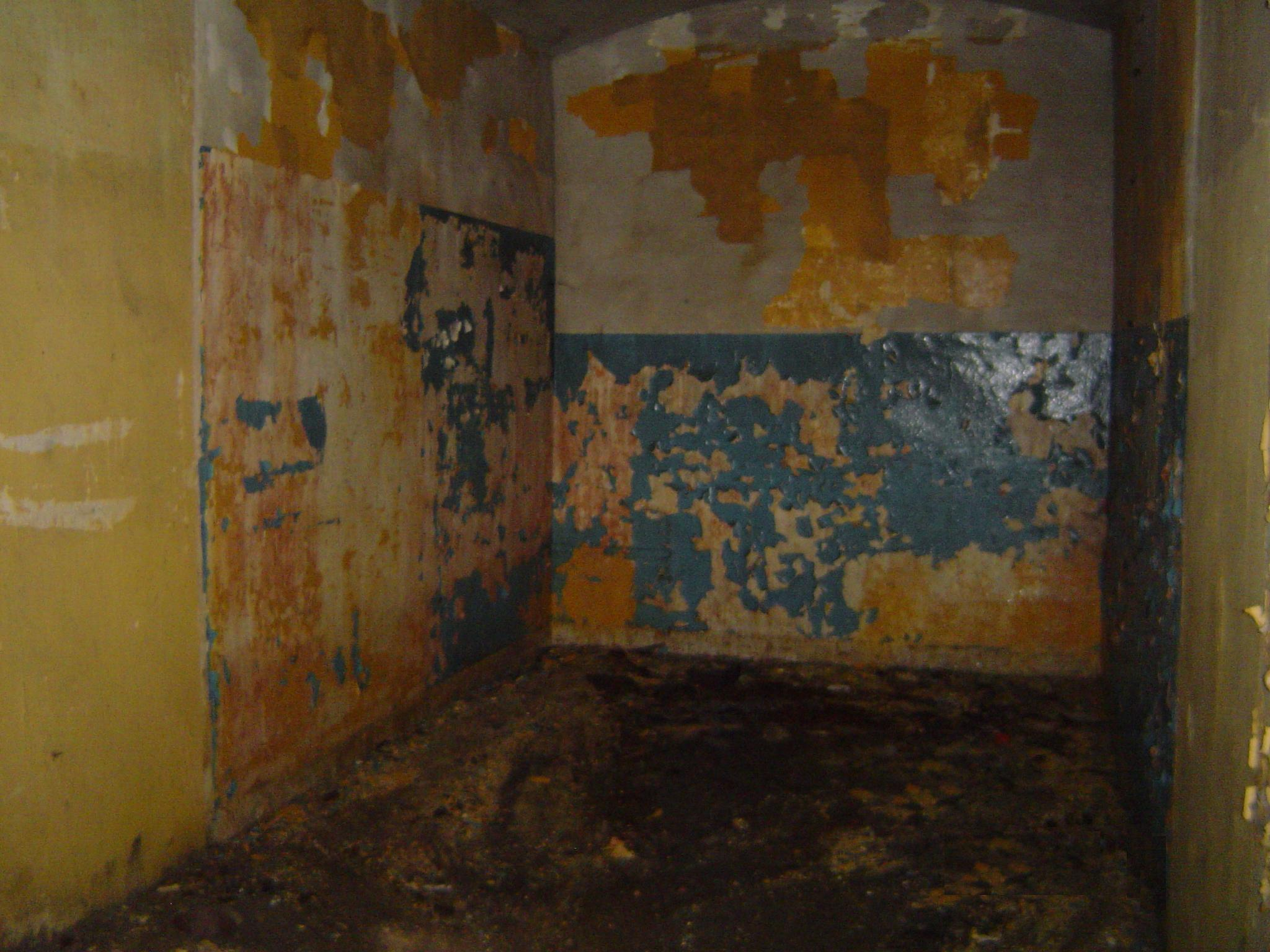
The inside of the main bunker

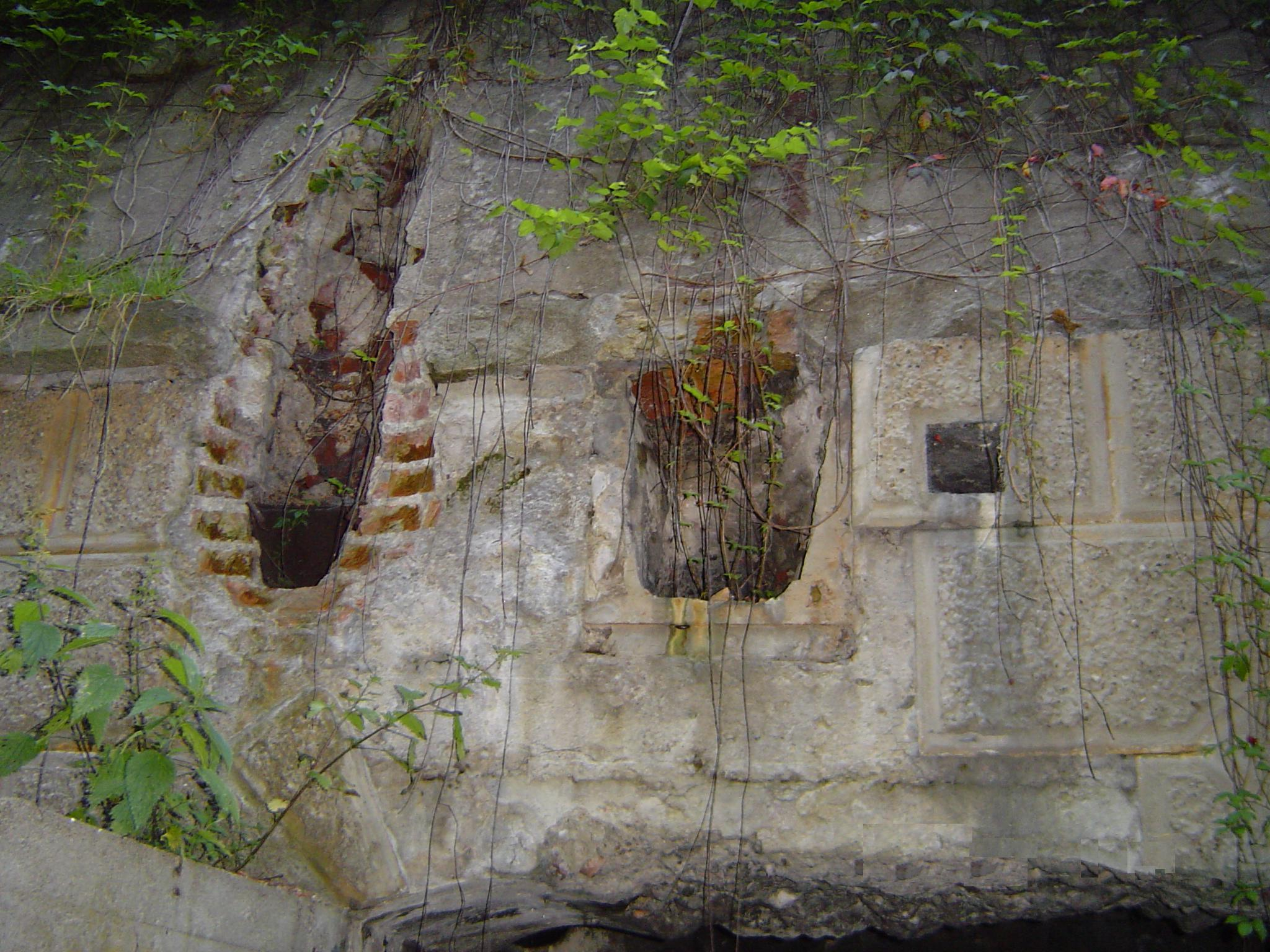
Visible traces of ventilation elements and a chimney

==== Fort Parski ====
On the prominent headland of Kępa Forteczna, Fort Parski was erected in 1900, consisting of a small infantry fort and an accompanying small shelter surrounded by an earth embankment. The thickness of the reinforced concrete floors was 1.75 meters. There were 3 guardrooms in the surrounding rampart. Currently open to visitors, it is fairly well preserved. The smaller shelter is well-preserved but closed. One of the guardrooms has a preserved ceiling reinforced with corrugated sheet metal.

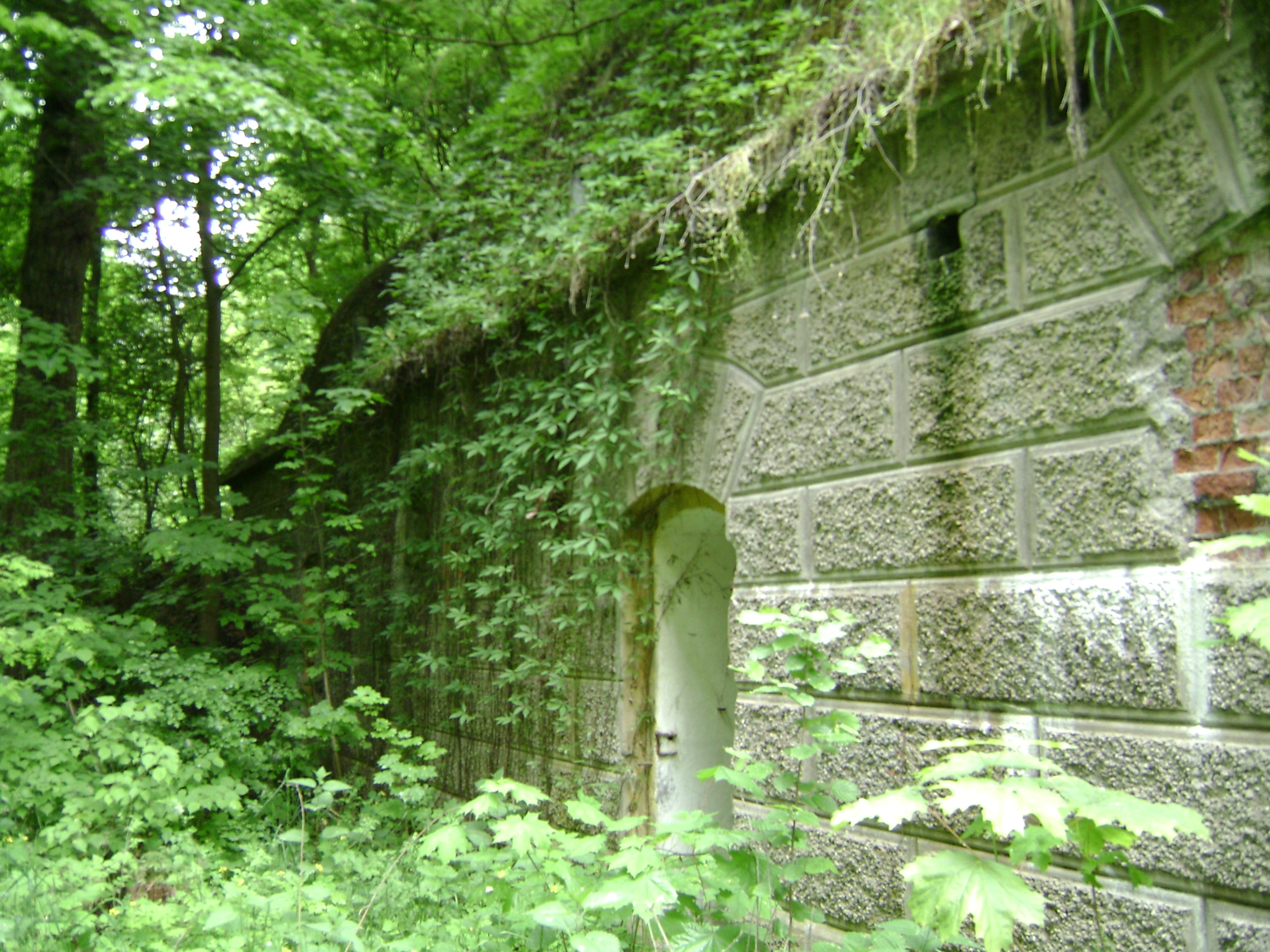
Fort Parski's barracks bunker

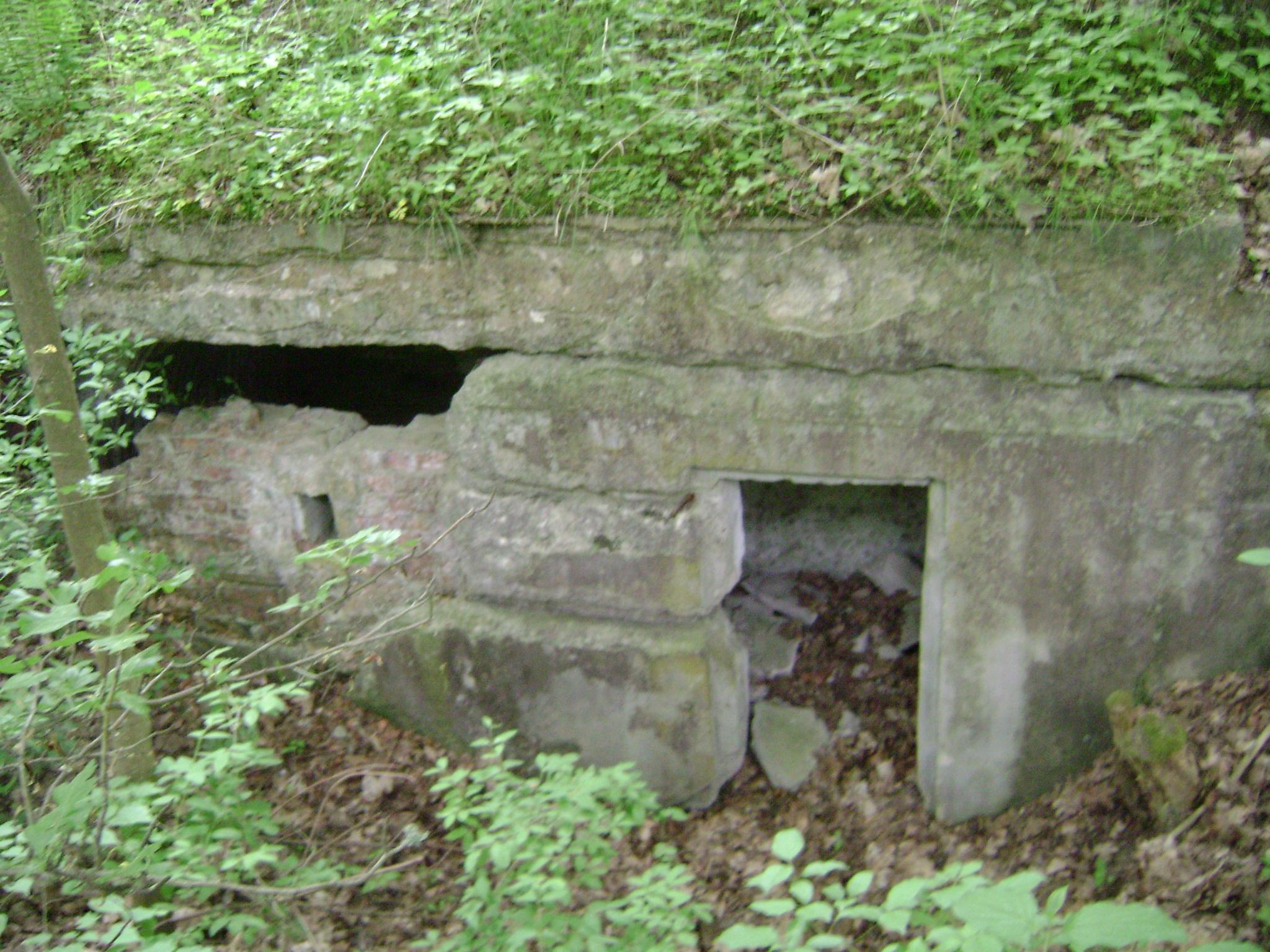
One of the guardhouses

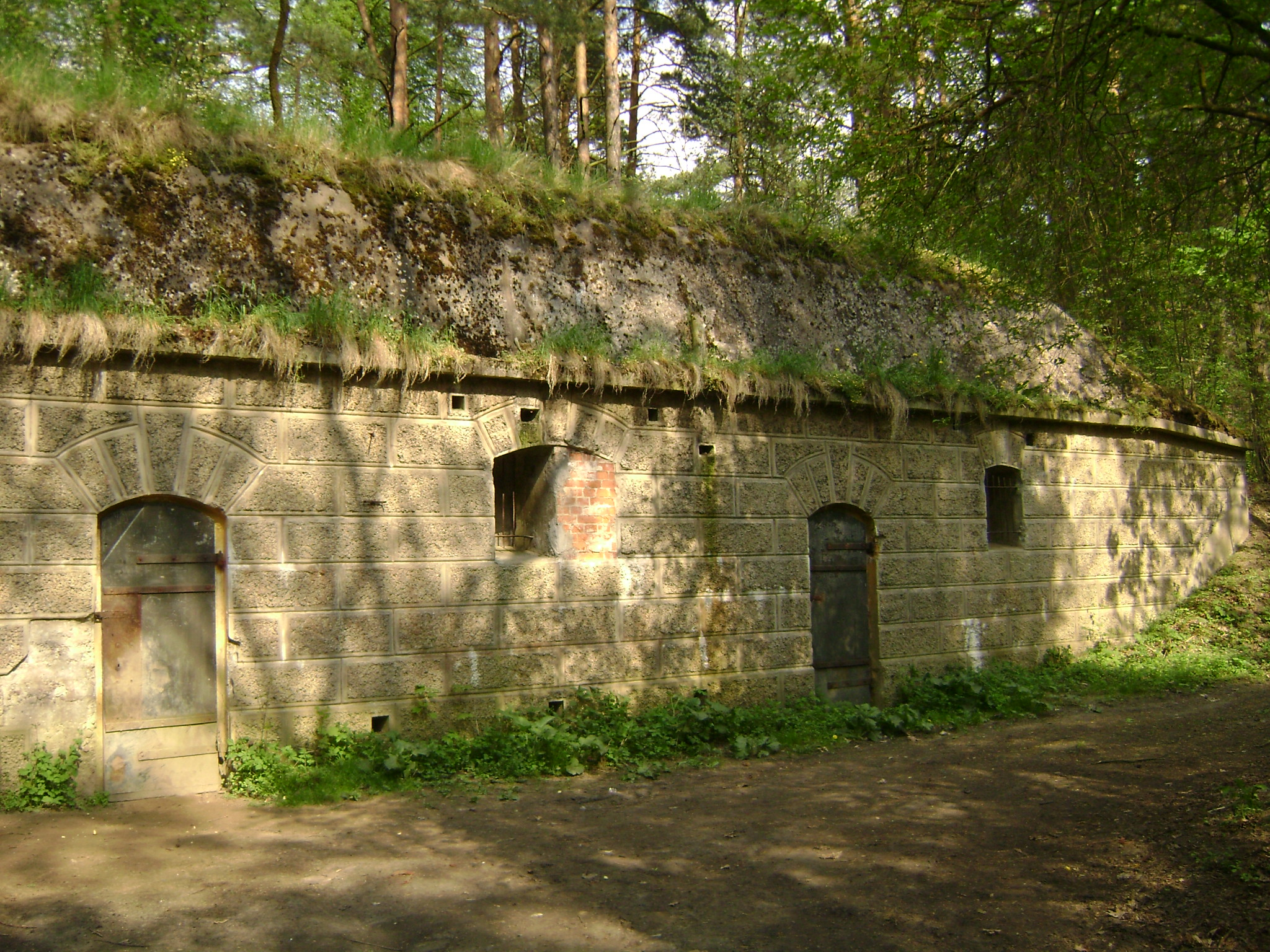
Smaller bunker of the fort

==== North Battery ====
The battery was situated north of the Citadel and had an earth construction. Only the ammunition niches and the shelters for the gun crews were made of concrete (with a weak, 10 cm thick wall). It was designed for 6 cannons of 100 mm caliber and was intended to provide direct protection for the Vistula river line. Currently in good condition, completely surrounded by earthworks. Out of the six crew shelters, only 2 are in ruins. On the right wing of the battery, there is a two-chamber ammunition shelter. In the battery's forefield, there is an observation shelter. In the rear field, there is another brick-and-concrete observation shelter with ruins of a tower and three observation openings.

=== Fort Greater Księża Góra ===
In the years 1890–1891, 2 infantry bunkers and 1 ammunition bunker were built. Their construction was brick-concrete. The total thickness of the vaults was 320 mm. Each infantry shelter was designed for a maximum of 108 soldiers. In the years 1894–1896, another infantry bunker and an armored battery for four 150 mm howitzers were built. The howitzers could fire up to 4 shots per minute, up to a distance of 7.2 km. The battery was operated by 63 soldiers and officers. The infantry bunker, intended for 158 soldiers, was connected to the battery by an underground passage. Observers' towers for artillery observation were placed on both wings. Their armor thickness was 15 cm. In 1898, another concrete infantry shelter was erected, this time intended for up to 252 soldiers. At the top of the fort, an open earth battery was placed, capable of accommodating 6 cannons of 120 mm caliber. The complex of buildings was complemented by a 2-chamber sanitary shelter. The whole area was surrounded by a flat earthen rampart with a barbed wire network and a fortress grille. The length of the fort was approximately 600 m. The rampart was defended frontally by infantry fire and ten 53 mm cannons in portable armored towers (Fahrpanzer), placed in previously prepared crescent-shaped concrete positions. Access to the fortifications was from the current Droga Graniczna Street.

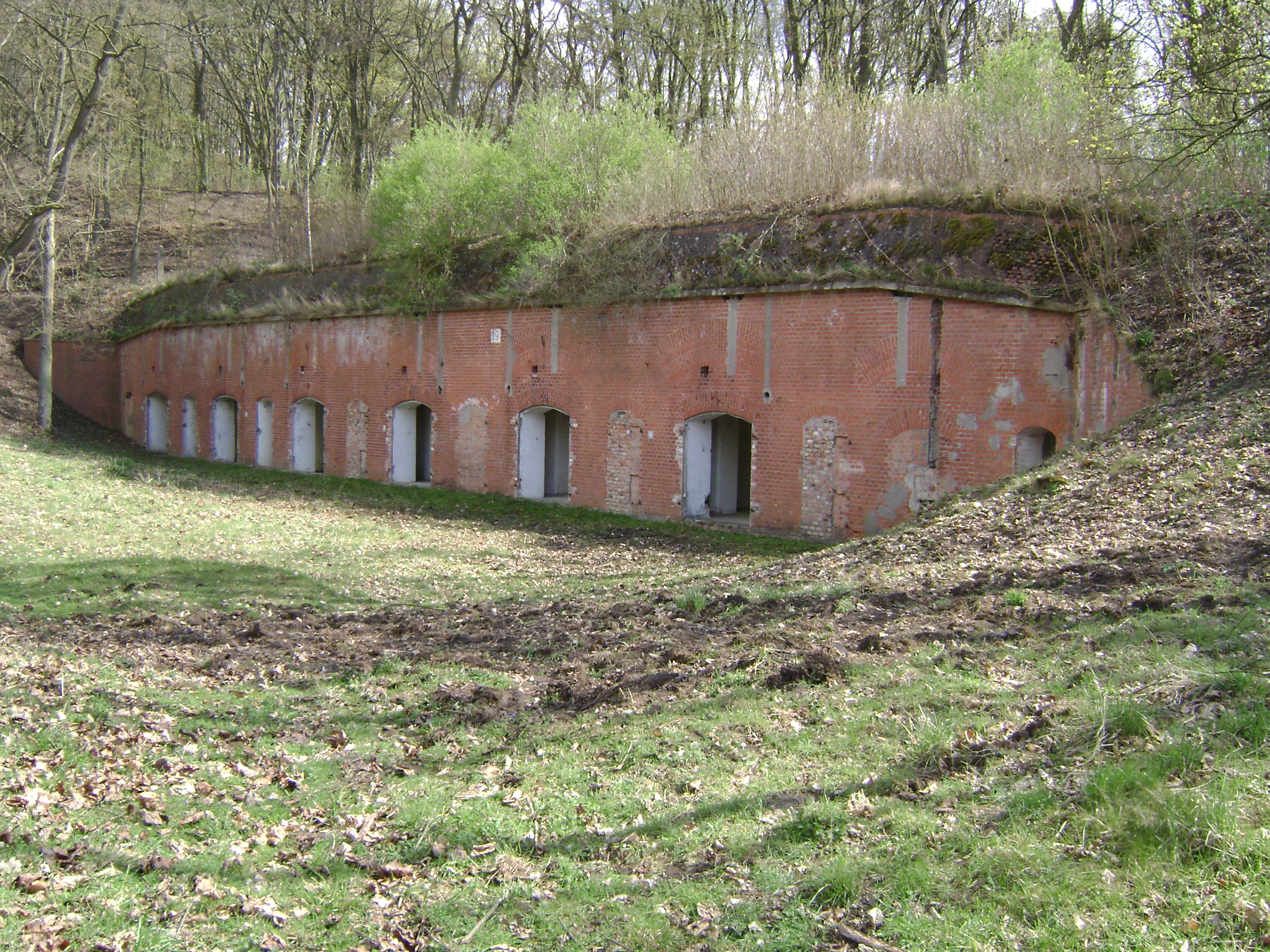
One of the infantry bunkers

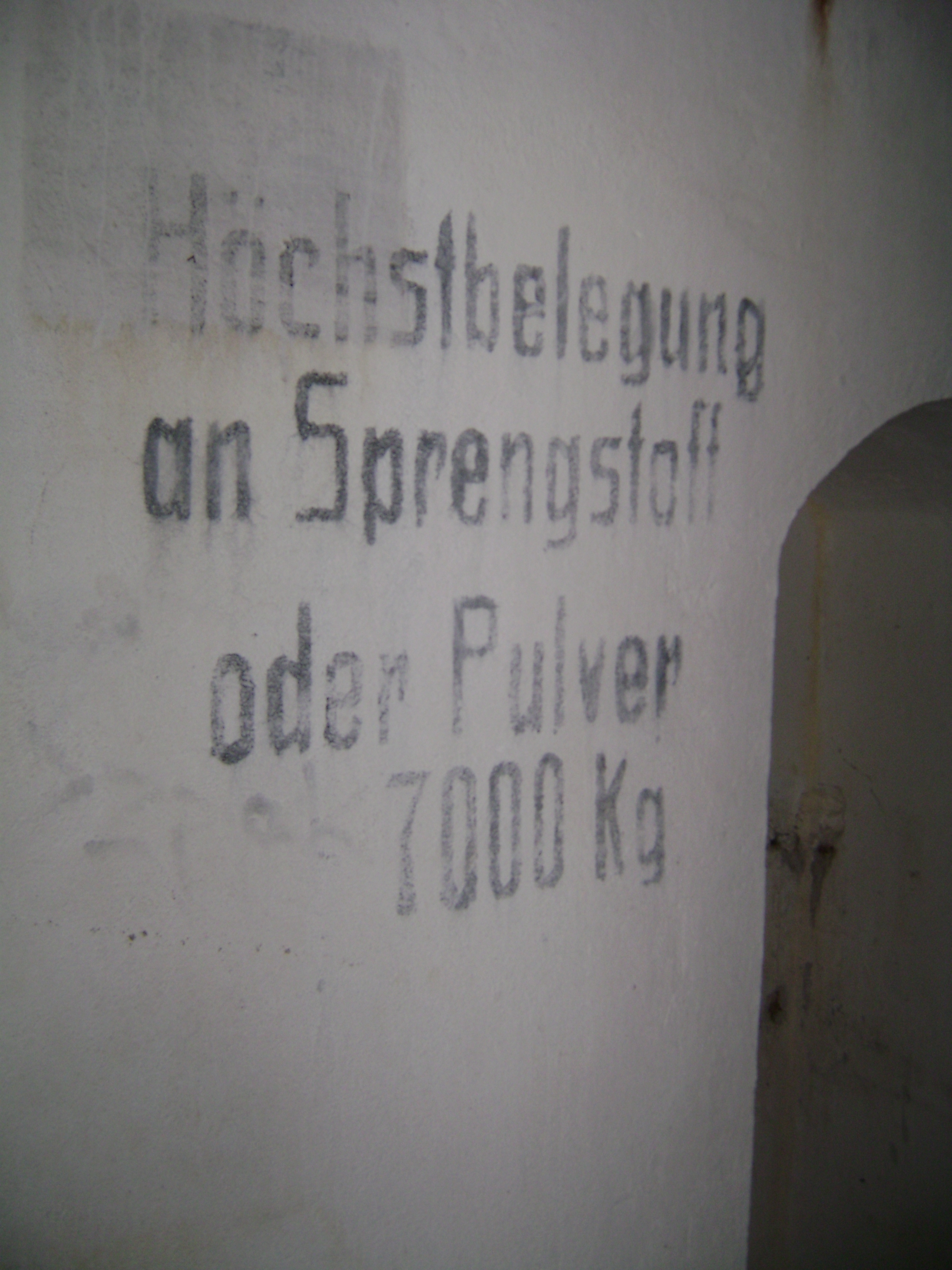
World War II inscriptions in German inside the bunker

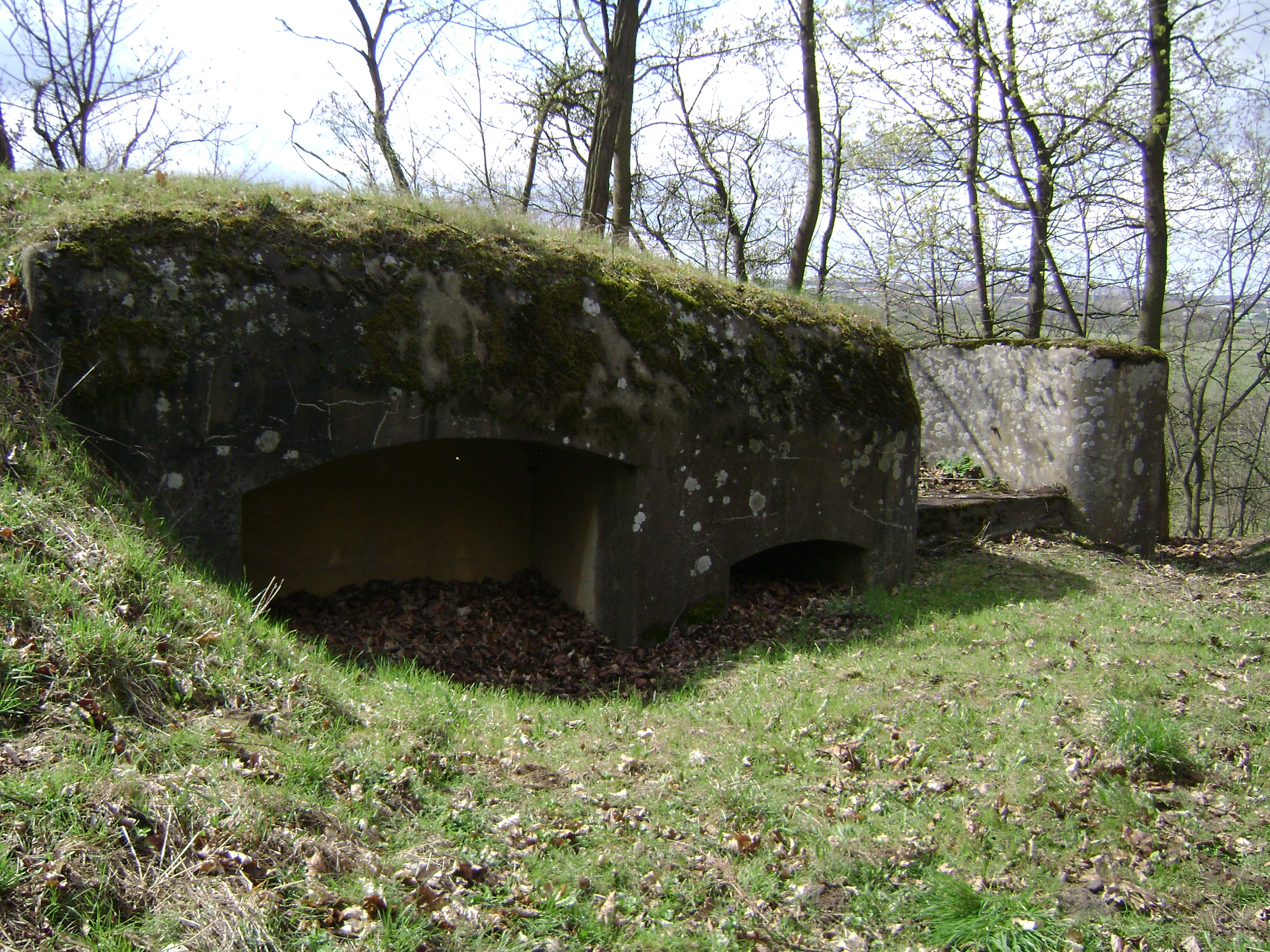
Position of Fahrpanzer

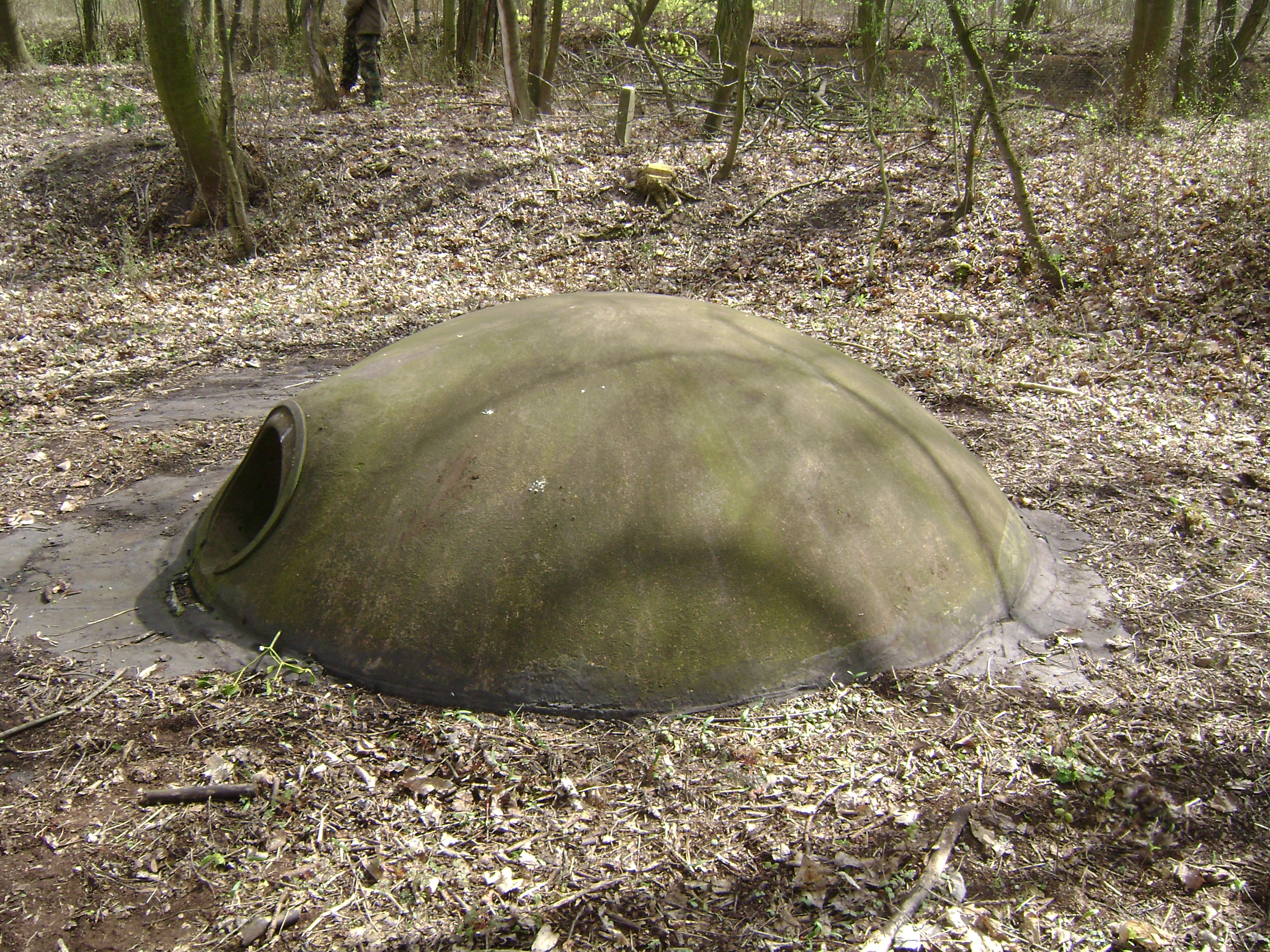
The turret of one of the 150 mm howitzers

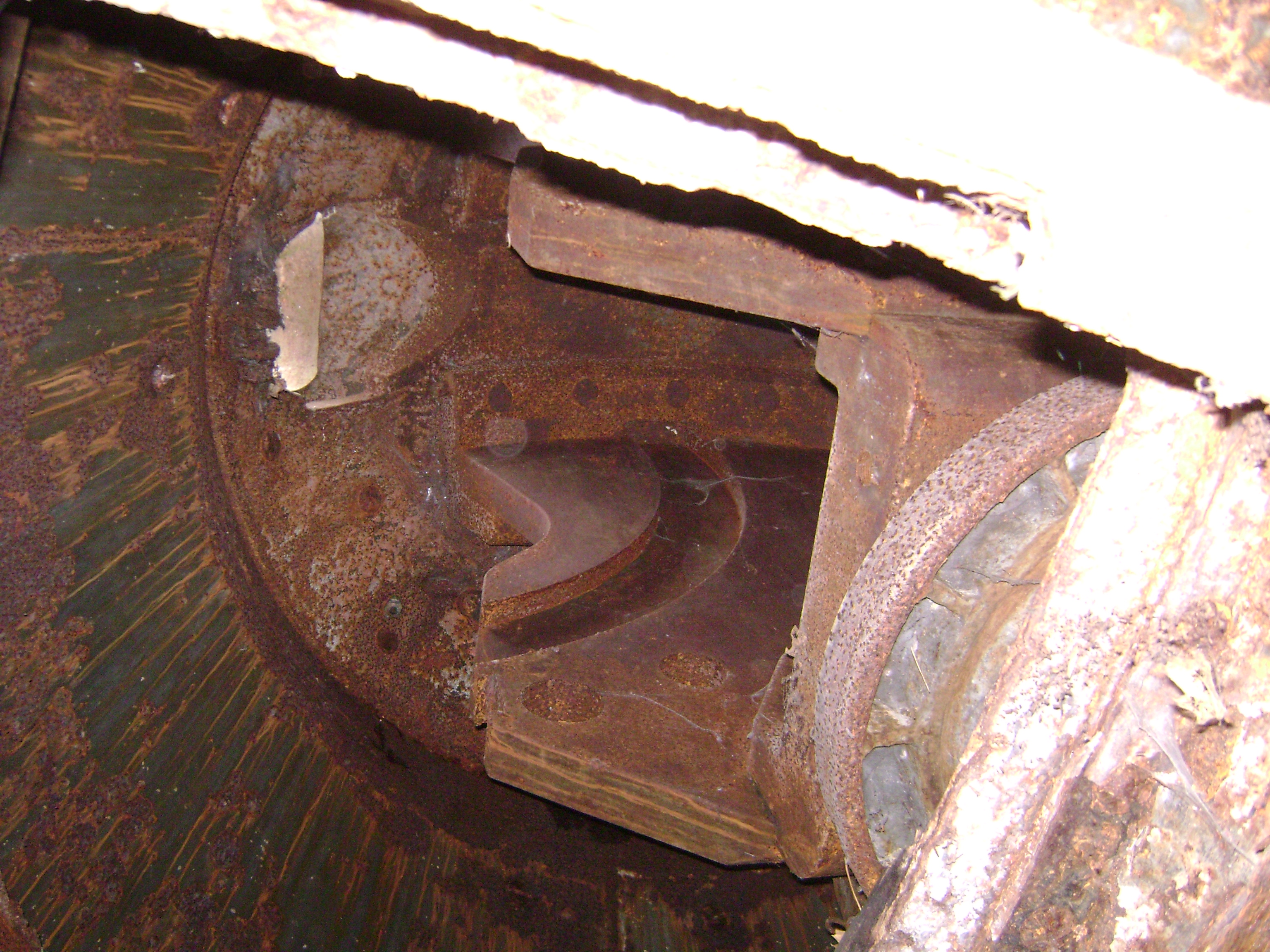
Interior of the turret of one of the 150 mm howitzers

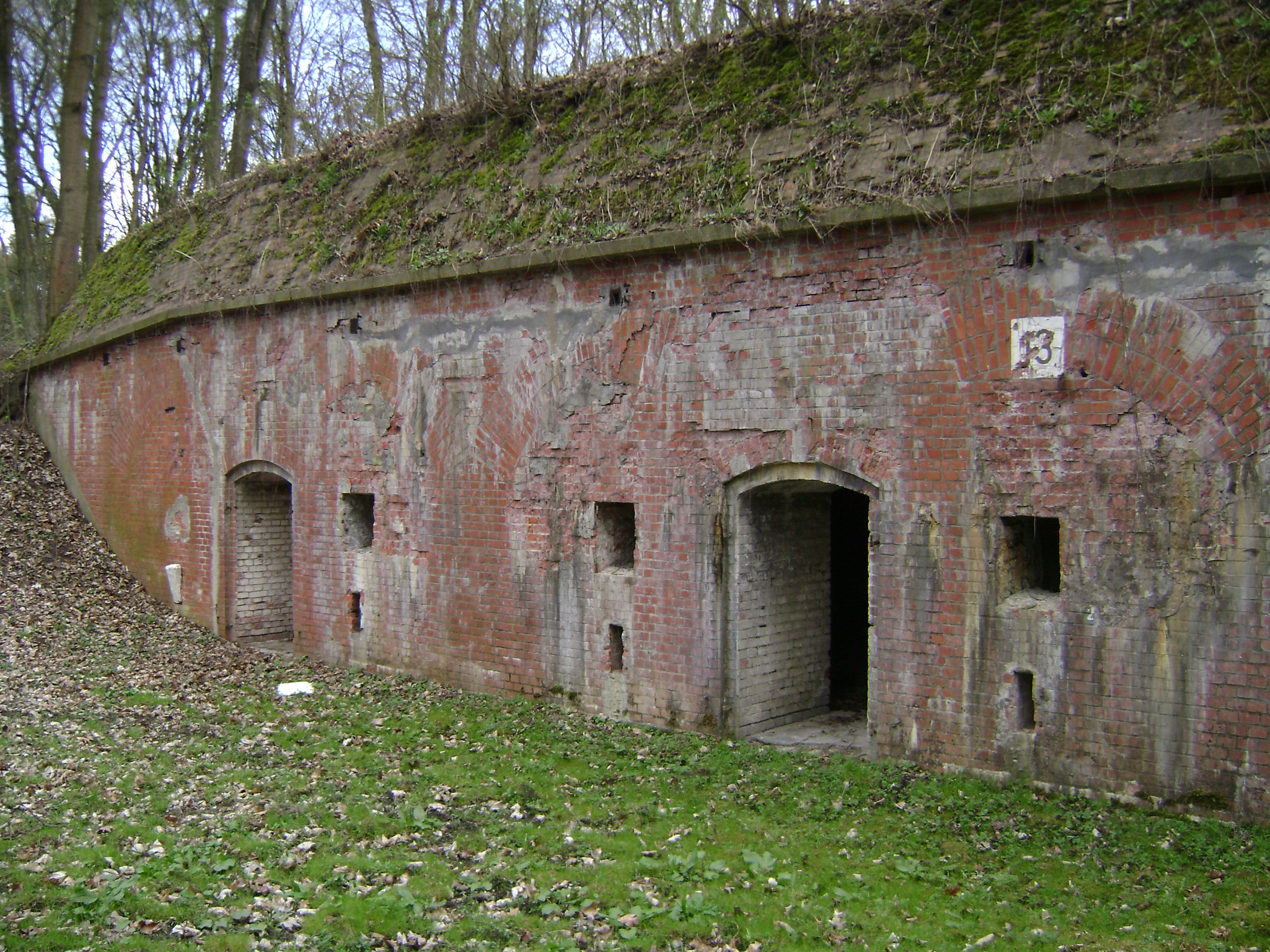
Ammunition bunker

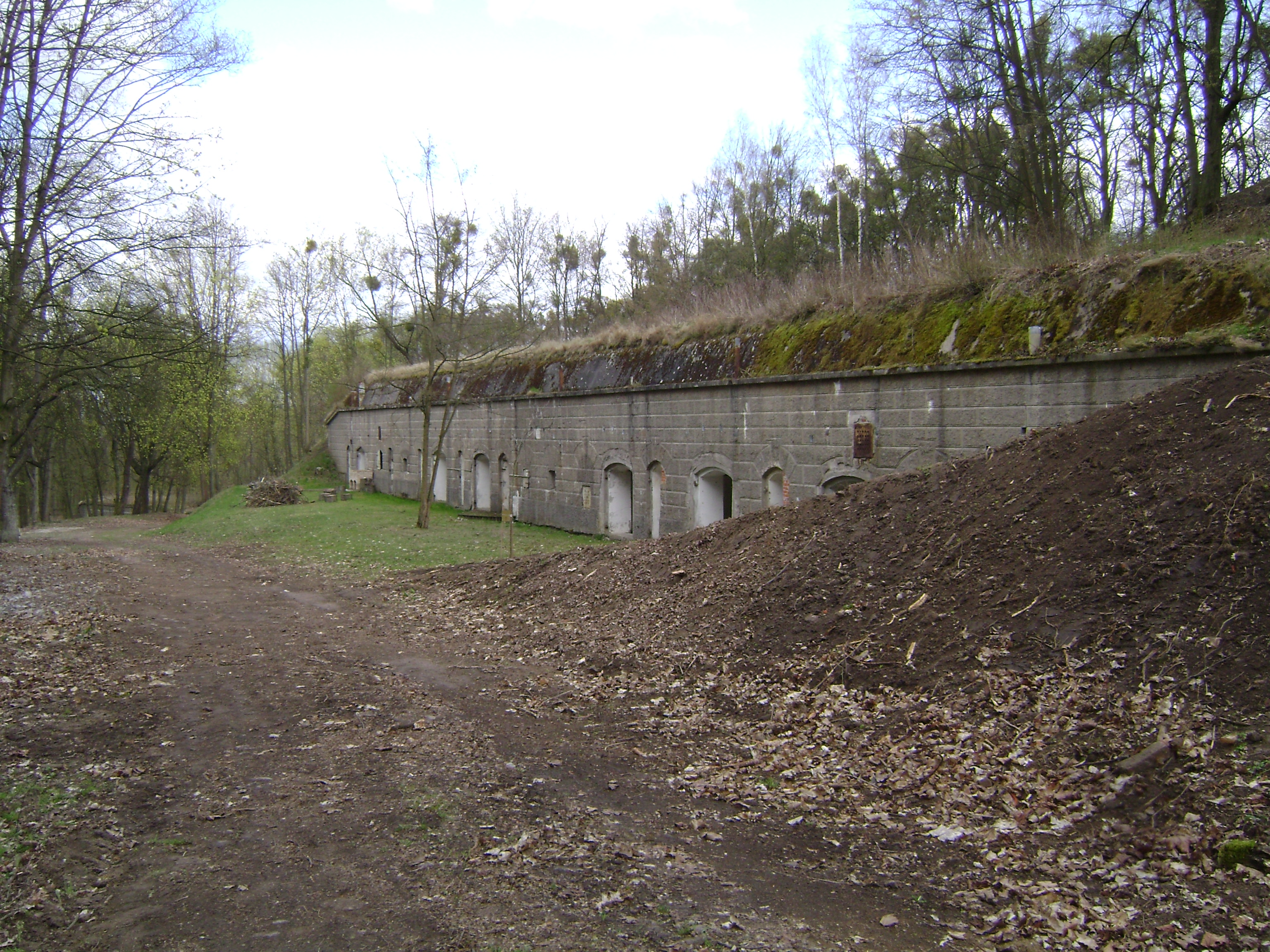
An infantry bunker from 1898

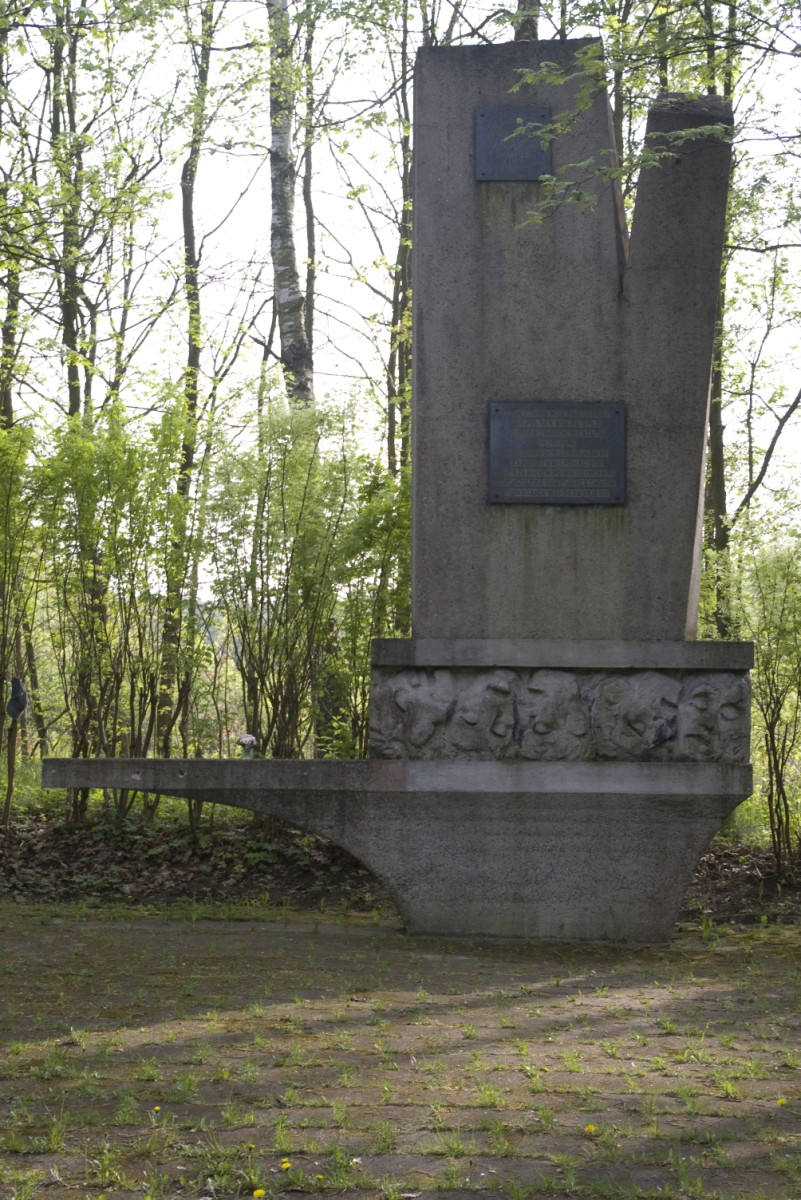
Monument on Księża Góra commemorating Poles murdered there during World War II

=== Fort Lesser Księża Góra ===
In 1892, an infantry bunker was built for 90 soldiers, made of brick and concrete. In 1898, a second infantry bunker was erected, this time made of concrete, which could accommodate 165 soldiers. Near the shelters, an earth battery was placed, capable of holding 6 guns of 90 mm caliber, as well as an earth battery for 6 guns of 120 mm caliber. The entire area was surrounded by a flattened rampart with a dense network of barbed wire. The fort was approximately 350 m long. For direct protection of the fort, two 2-chamber guardhouses for 34 soldiers and two guardhouses for 17 soldiers were placed in the rampart, as well as four concrete positions for 53 mm Fahrpanzers. Access to the fortifications was from the present Droga Graniczna Street.

=== Fort Strzemięcin ===
On the high bank of the Vistula river near the no longer existing Strzemięcin folwark, large-scale fortification works began at the end of the 19th century. The emerging structures were intended to secure both the land and water approaches to the city from the south. The first to be built was a brick and earth fort, now in a state of advanced ruin. In its immediate vicinity are guardhouses, of which only two have been fully preserved. During a visit, one may come across a dry moat, retaining walls, and even posts with visible barbed wire in several places, as well as an artillery battery consisting of mobile guns in turrets (Fahrpanzer). The Strzemięcin fortifications were only used in combat once, in 1945. At that time, a German garrison under the command of Captain Friedhausen, consisting of 8 officers and 102 soldiers, resisted Soviet forces for several days while surrounded, until running out of ammunition. The Strzemięcin complex is one of the oldest and largest fortifications of its kind in the vicinity of the city. The fort is located on the present-day Zachodnia Street.

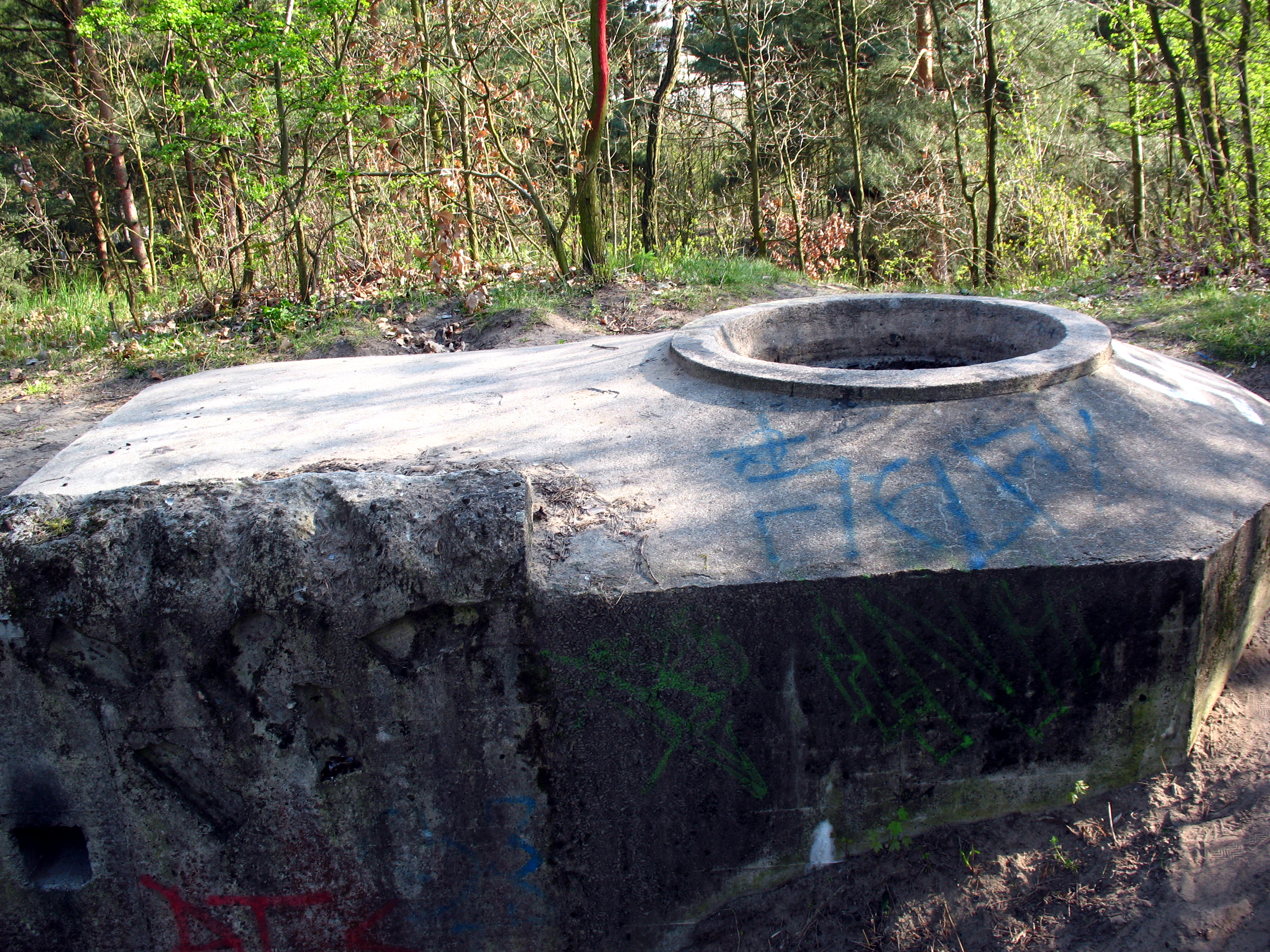
Tobruk in Fort Strzemięcin

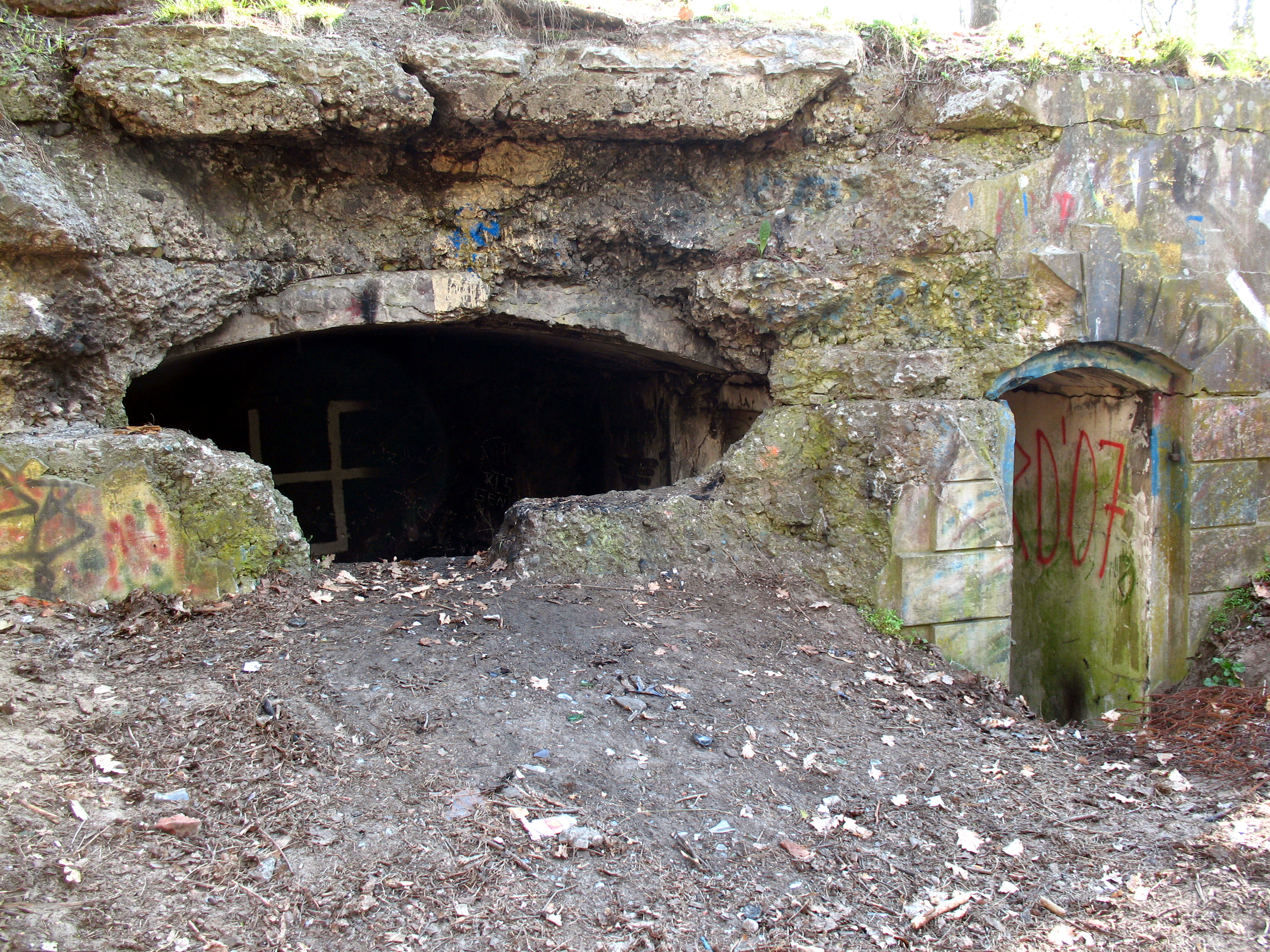
Ruins of a bunker at Fort Strzemięcin

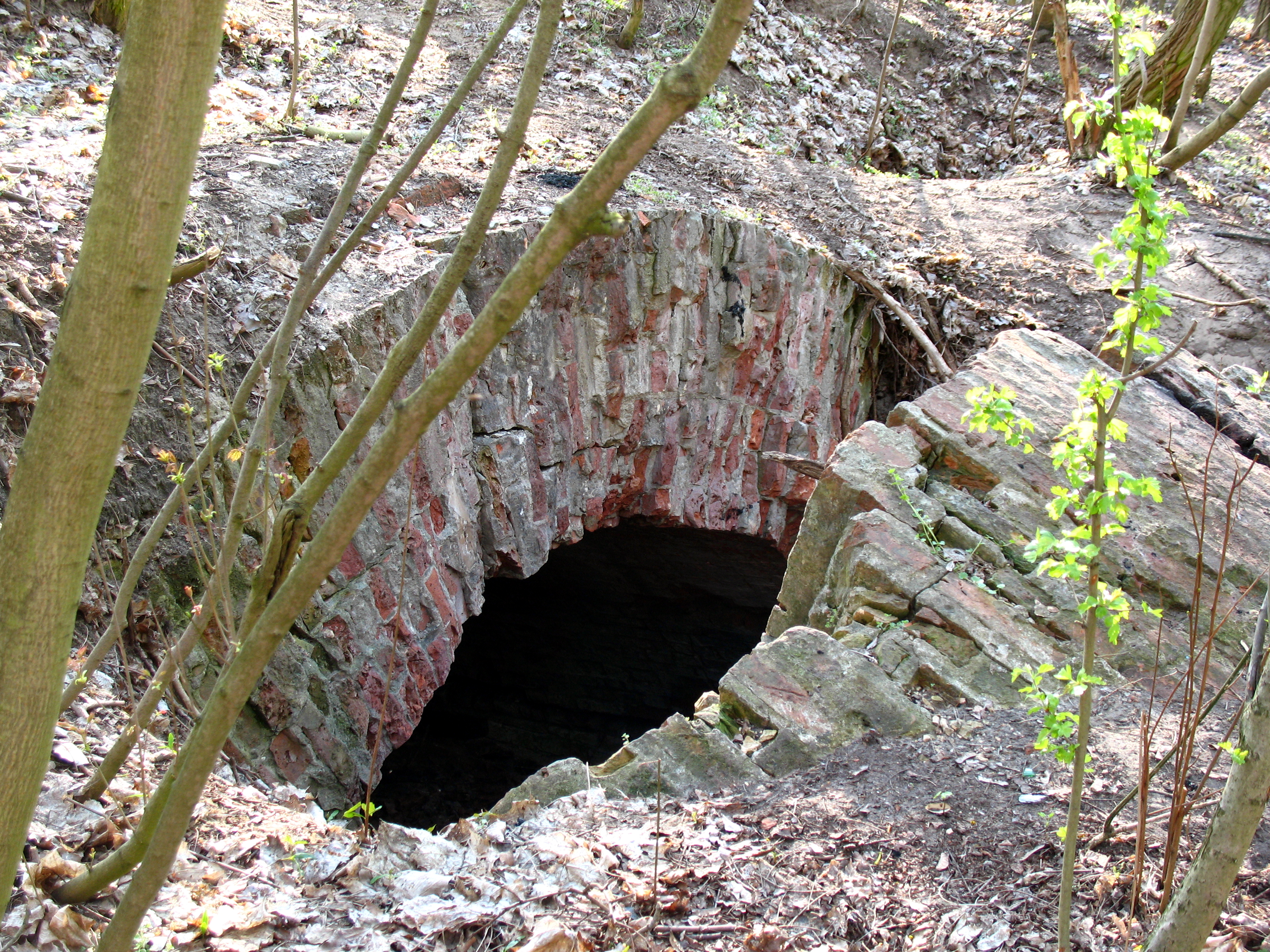
Ruins of fortifications at Fort Strzemięcin

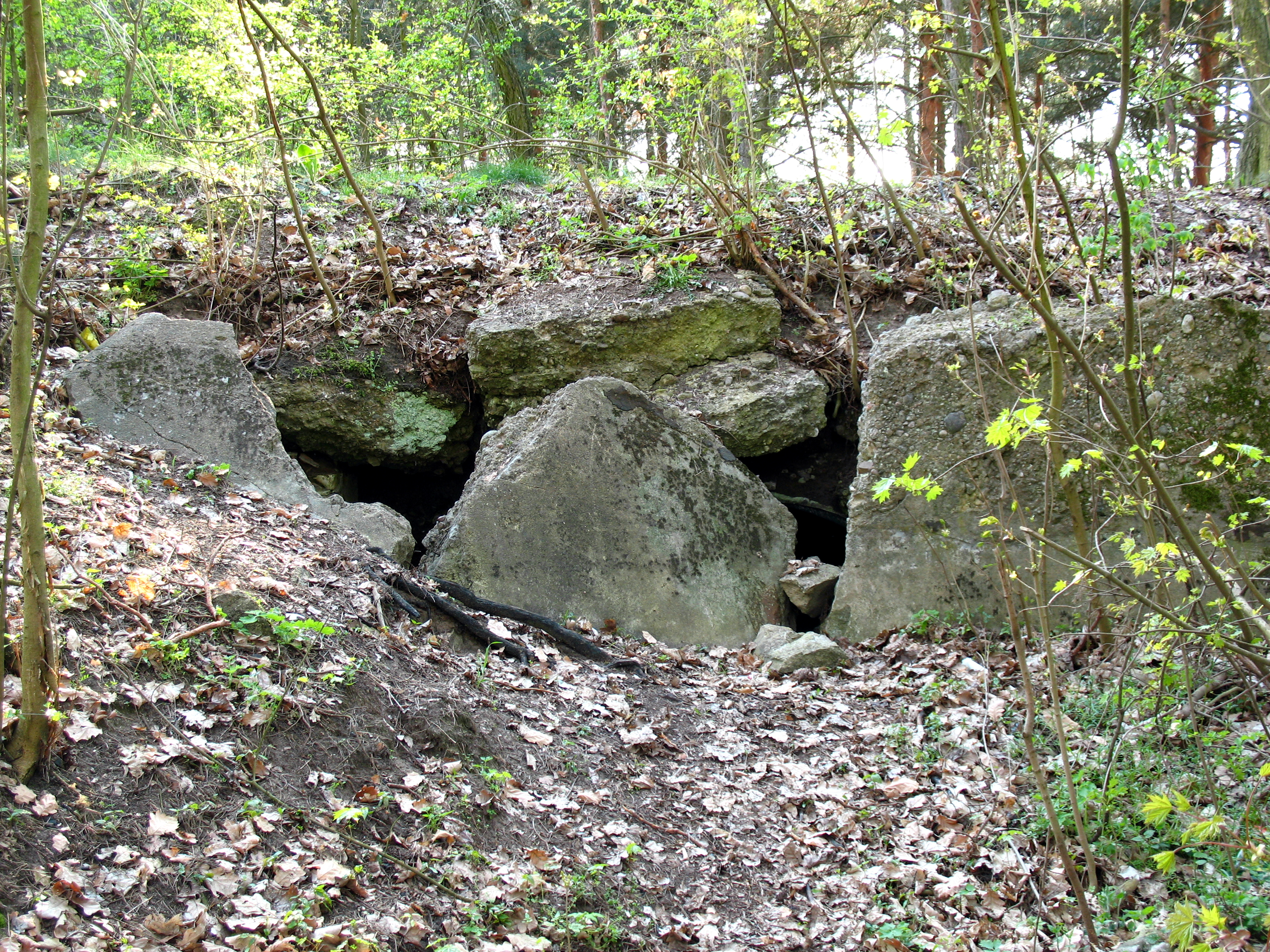
Ruins of fortifications at Fort Strzemięcin

=== Southern Front Nizinny ===
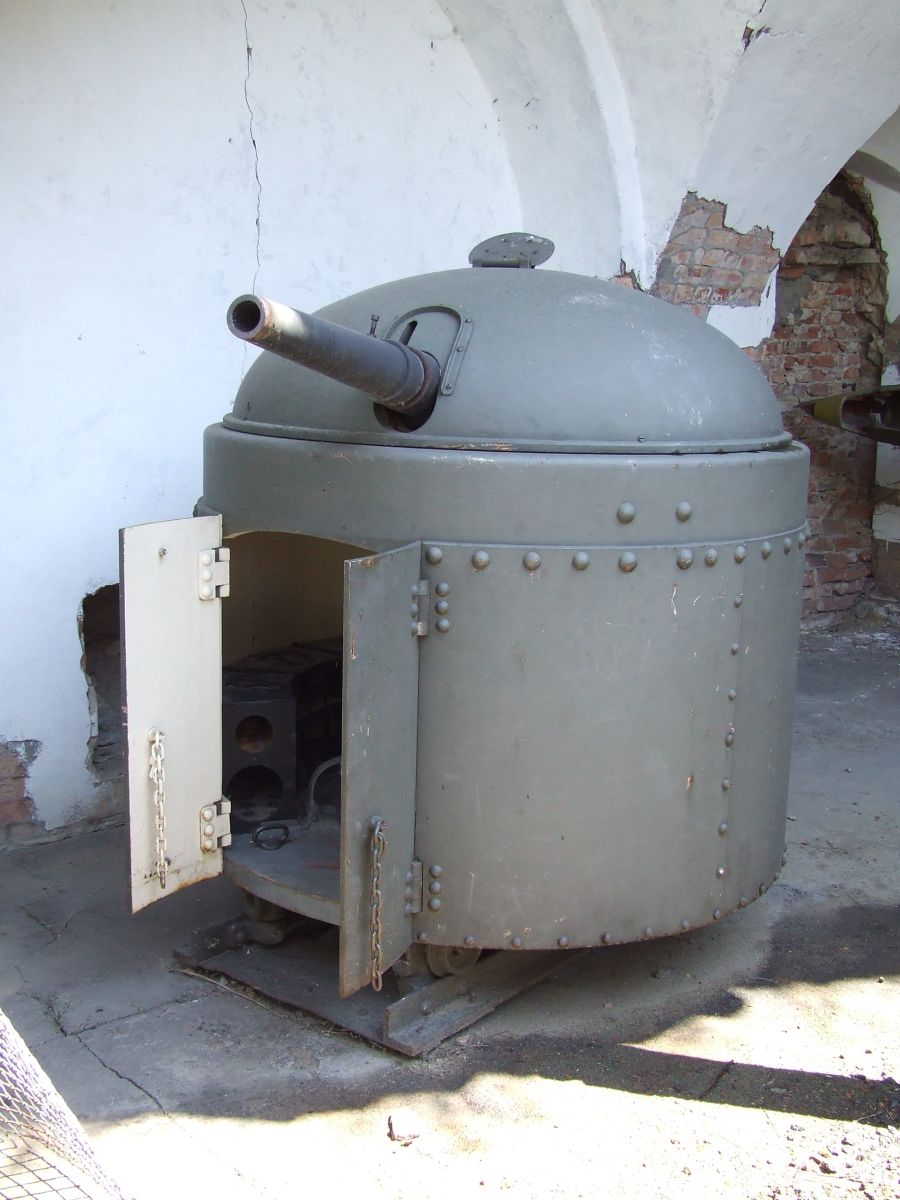
Fahrpanzer

It consisted of Forts Gać and Lasek Miejski, positioned on both sides of the road to Radzyń Chełmiński, with the Semi-Armored Battery Leśny Dwór behind them, located behind the battery's ammunition shelter (currently Żwirki Street), two positions for 57 mm Fahrpanzers on both sides of the road, and Fort Tuszewo situated between Fort Gać and Księża Góra. The task of the Southern Front Nizinny was to defend the southern part of the city, lacking significant natural defenses. Next to the battery, on its right wing, you can see an aerial target trap, built in 1940, used to check the accuracy of machine guns installed in Messerschmitt Bf 109 and Focke-Wulf Fw 190 fighter planes undergoing maintenance at nearby aircraft factories.

==== Fort Gać ====
The fort was located on the eastern side of the road. It was equipped with a powerful bunker for 280 soldiers. Safety was ensured by 2.5-meter walls and a 3-meter ceiling. It was surrounded by a rampart and guard posts. After the war, it was completely demolished, and currently, blocks of the Lotnisko housing estate are located on its site. One Tobruk-type shelter has been preserved in the vicinity of the Complex of General Education Schools No. 5, along with a small fragment of the fort's rampart neck. Architecturally, it was similar to the twin Fort Lasek Miejski.

==== Fort Las Miejski ====
The fort, located on the western side of the road to Radzyń, was equipped with a powerful bunker for 280 soldiers, featuring 2.5-meter walls and a 3-meter ceiling designed to withstand hits from 420 mm caliber shells. Situated in Las Miejski, the ramparts are currently well-preserved, with remnants of stakes in the moat for securing barbed wire. The infantry shelter has a blown-out facade, presenting an impressive ruin that effectively showcases the structure of the building. The left and middle guard posts are well-maintained, while the right guard post was likely unfinished, lacking the reinforcing corrugated iron ceiling. The fort is open to visitors on Kasprowicz Street.

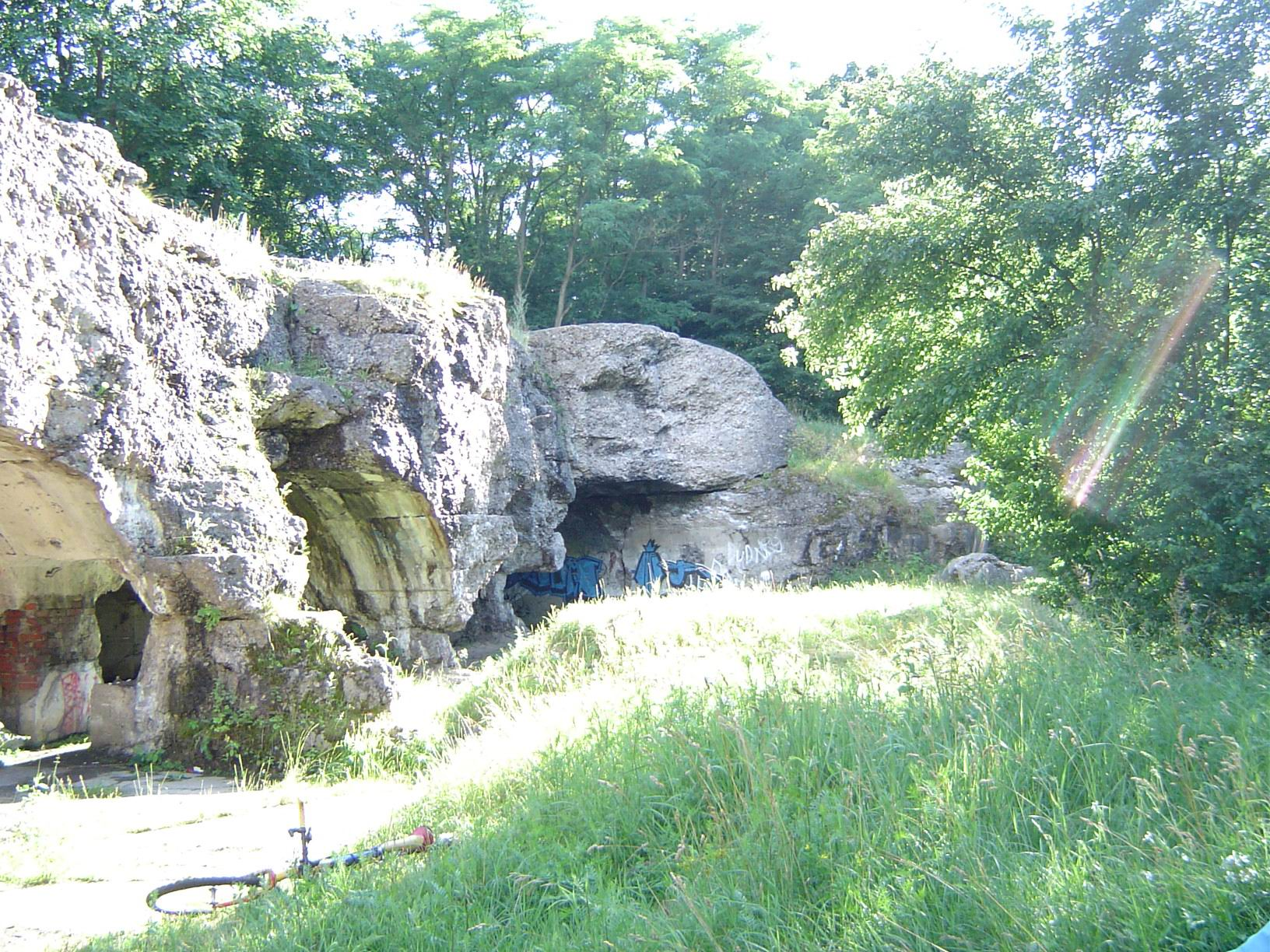
Destroyed facade of the main bunker

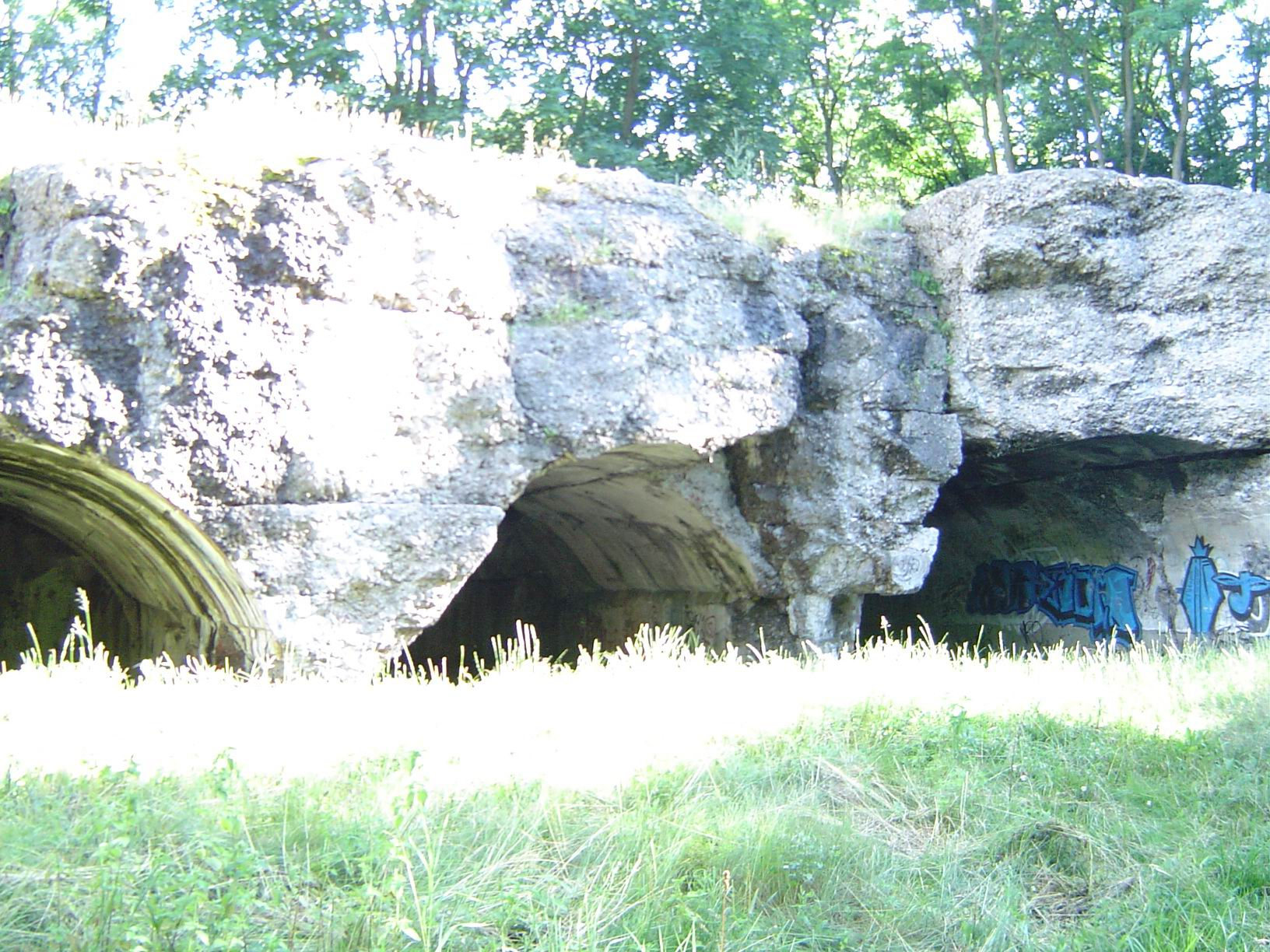
View of 3-meter ceiling and 2.5-meter walls

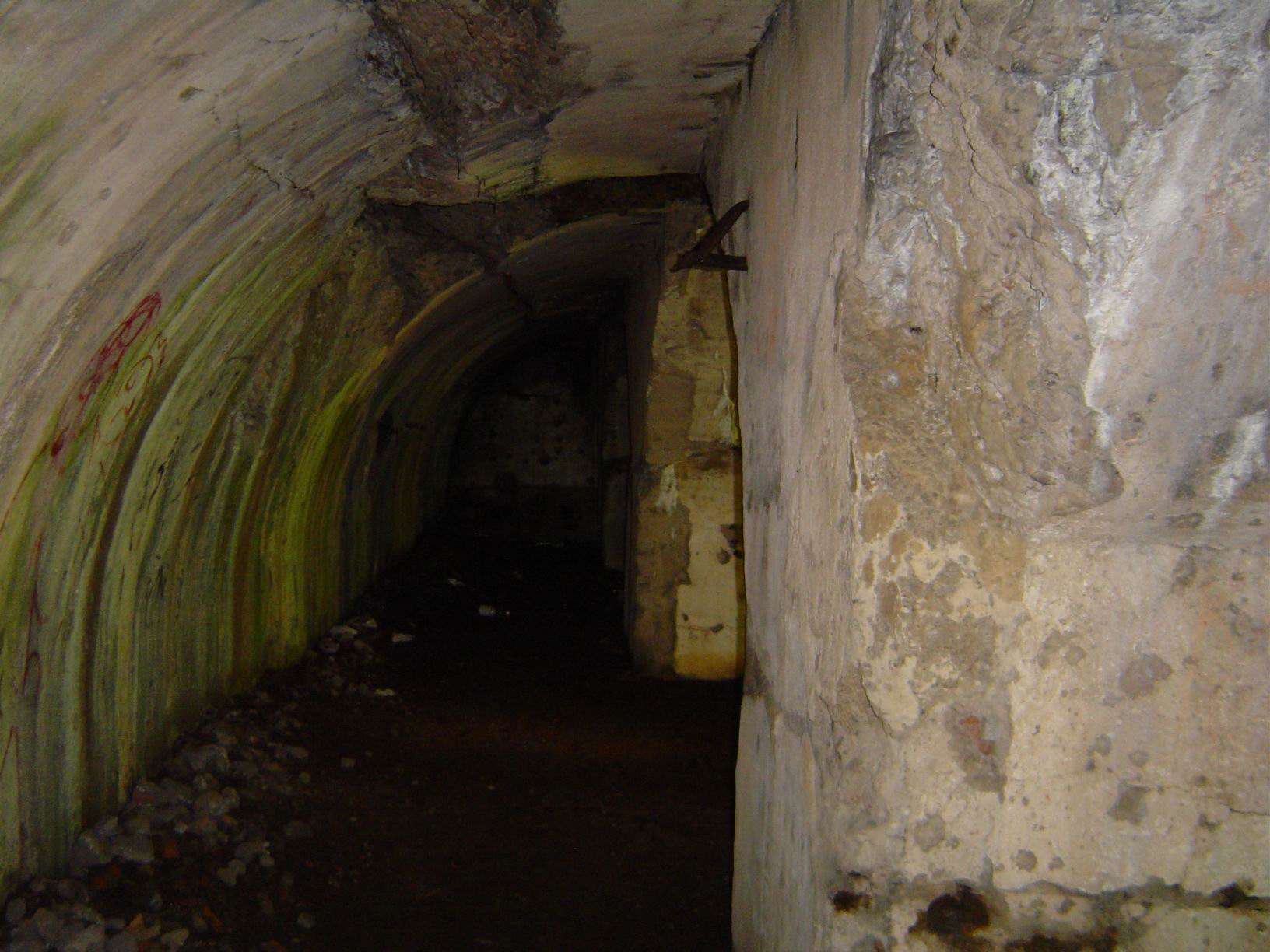
The inside of the main bunker

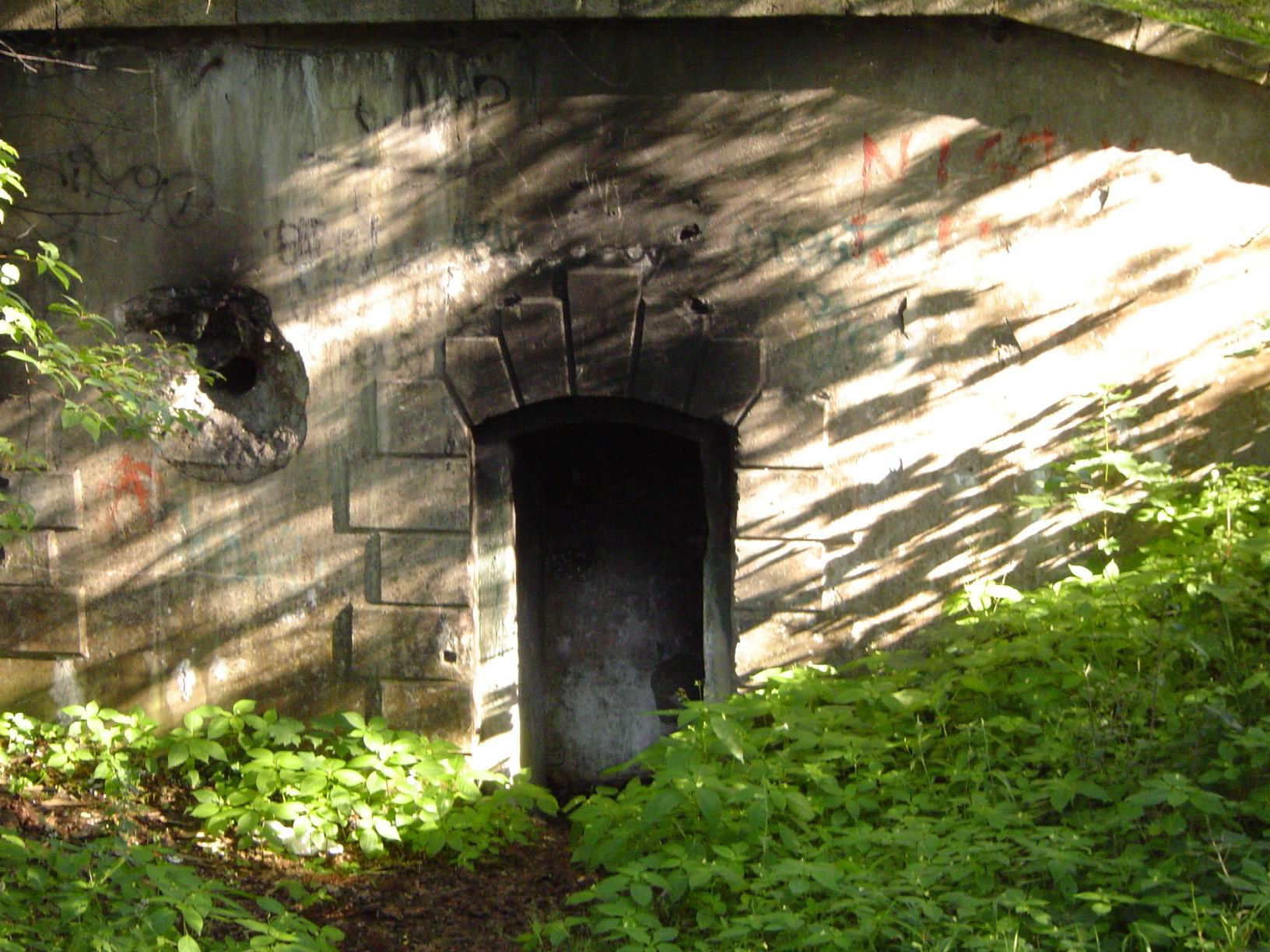
One of the guardhouses

==== Fort Tuszewo ====
The fort was constructed between 1905 and 1906 with the purpose of filling the gap between Fort Gać and Księże Góry. Presently, the main shelter and guard posts are completely demolished, but the frontal rampart remains intact.

==== Half-track Battery Leśny Dwór ====
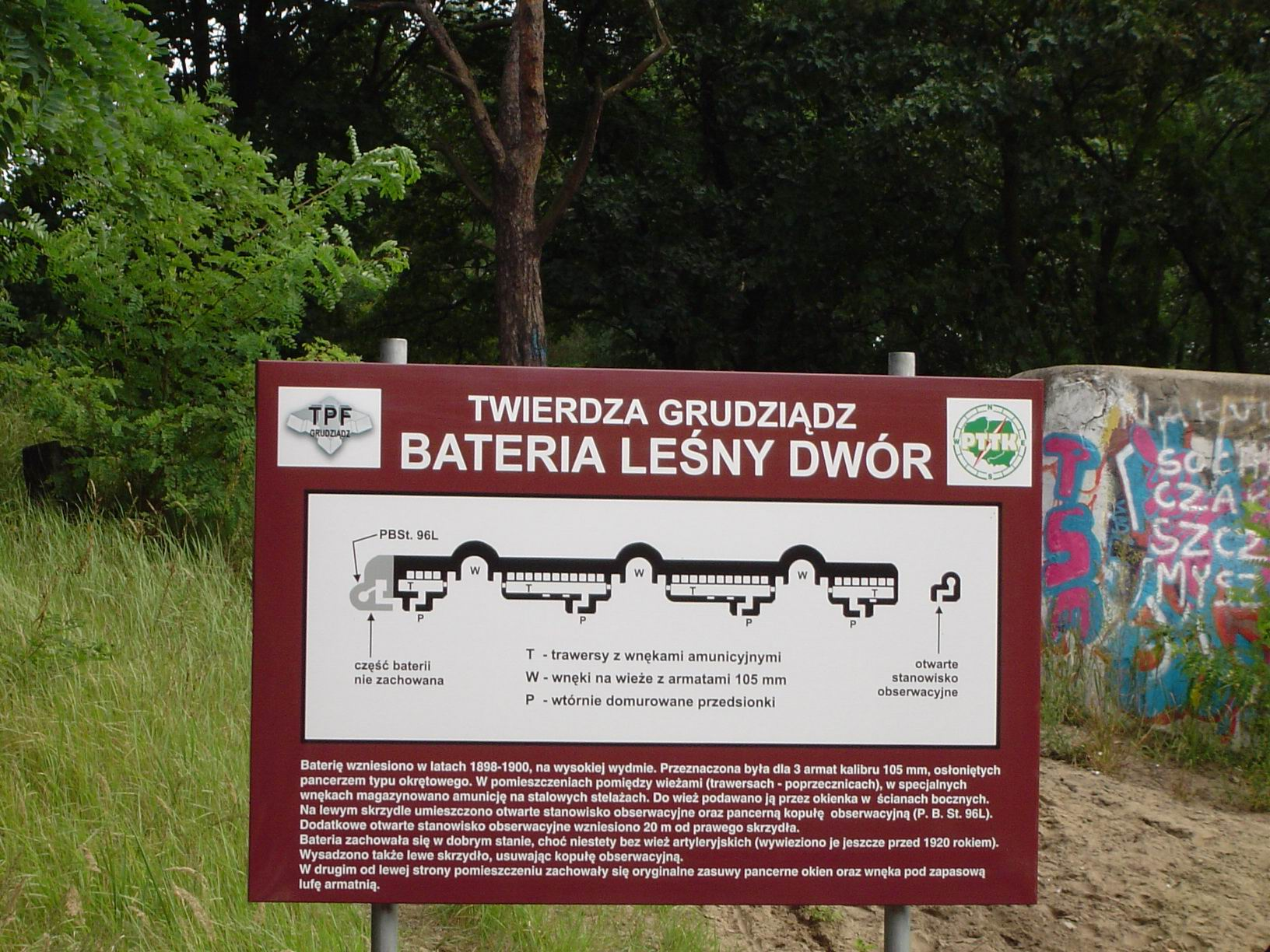
Information board next to the battery

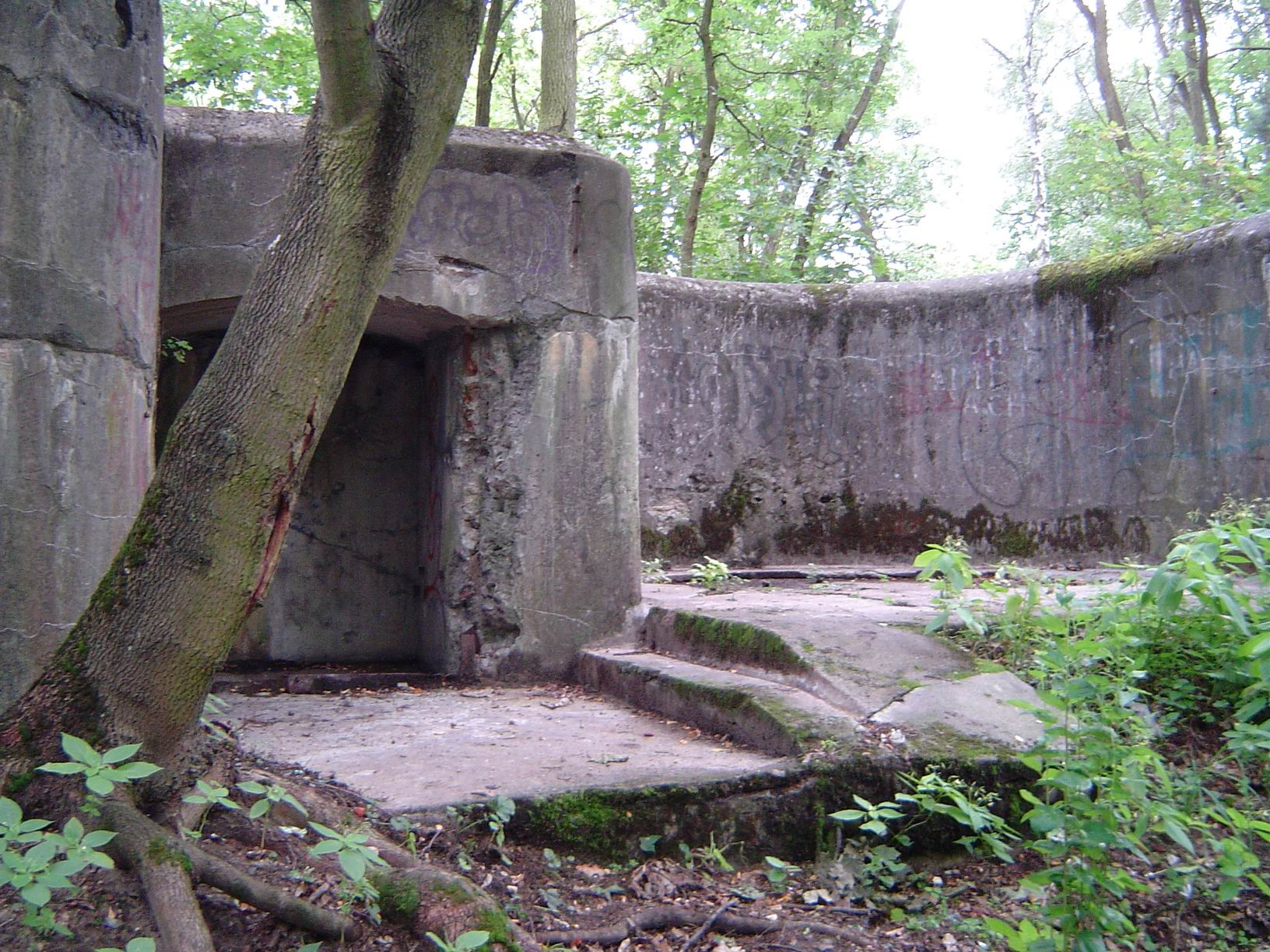
Battery in contemporary condition

The battery was built between 1898 and 1899 on a dune. It is similar to the battery at Strzemięcin and the southern front of the fortress in Toruń. The battery, constructed of reinforced concrete, was designed for coastal artillery batteries. It could accommodate 3 flat-trajectory guns with a caliber of 105 mm in armored turrets. The armor thickness of the turrets was 8 cm at the front and top, and 4 cm at the rear. The guns had a firing rate of 9 rounds per minute. The range of fire with a regular grenade was 10.8 km, with shrapnel shell 8.5 km, and with grapeshot 0.6 km. The weight of the turret was 19 tons. The turrets could rotate 360 degrees. They were protected from the front by a concrete parapet, a flat rampart, and a shallow moat equipped with barbed wire and a fortress grille. Ammunition depots and crew quarters were located in the parapet and transverse sections. An open concrete observation post was located on the right flank, while an observation post in an immovable armored tower was located on the left flank. The wall thickness of the tower made of nickel steel was 10 cm.

The battery's crew consisted of: 1 officer, 8 non-commissioned officers, 37 gunners, and 4 observers. Currently, the battery is fairly well preserved and open to visitors. The gun turrets and the observation dome on the left wing (which was blown up) are missing. An open observation post is located nearby, in the vicinity of Żwirki Street in Grudziądz.

=== Defensive bridge in Grudziądz ===
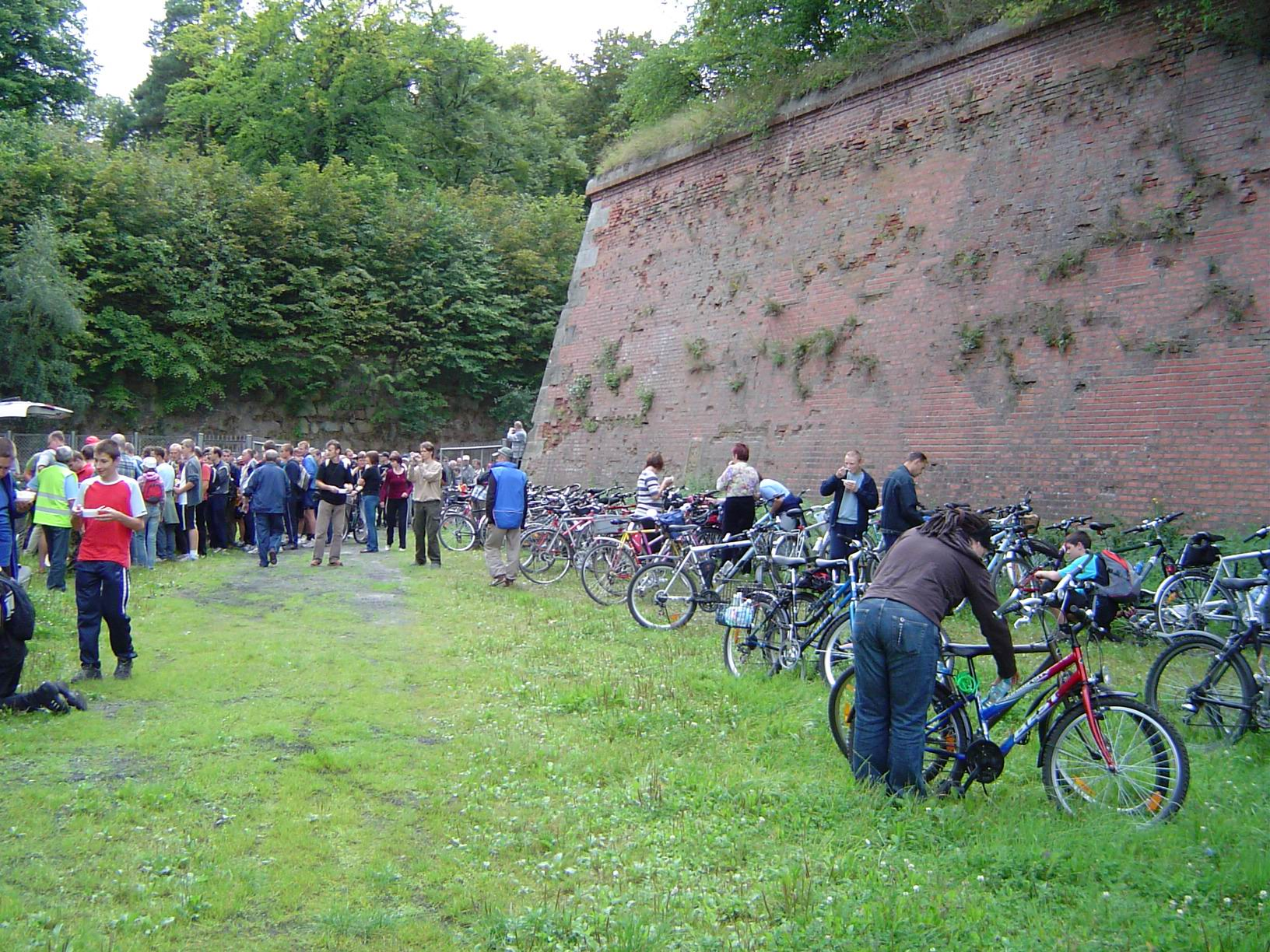
Participants in the rally "To de Courbière's Fortress" at the Citadel

The bridge, which was 1.092 km long, had 11 spans, each 97 meters long. The railway track had a width of 4.4 meters, while the road was 6 meters wide. It accommodated railway tracks of a line connecting (in Laskowice) two strategic lines: Bydgoszcz-Tczew-Kaliningrad and Poznań-Toruń-Wystruć. The bridge was constructed for 5,386,000 marks by the Eastern Railway between 1876 and 1879. The construction was supervised by the construction counselor Souche. On the western abutment, there were two single-story brick blockhouses prepared for circular defense, along with a double gate between them; on the eastern abutment, there was only one gate on pillar X. Mine chambers were formed in pillars IX and X.

== Nomenclature ==
=== Nomenclature of the fortress' elements ===
Prussian Partition period – German name	Polish name	Interwar period	Construction period
Stremotzin	Strzemięcin	–	1896
Stadtwald (Neuhof – West)	Las Miejski (Nowy Dwór – Zachód)	Fort Chłapowskiego	1896–98
Gatsch (Neuhof – Ost)	Gać (Nowy Dwór – Wschód)	–	1896–98
Schirmlaffettenbatterie Waldhof	Bateria Leśny Dwór	–	1898–1902
Tusch	Tuszewo	Fort Bema	1905–06
Grosser Pfaffenberg	Wielka Księża Góra	Fort Dąbrowskiego	1889–98
Kleiner Pfaffenberg	Mała Księża Góra	Fort Łukasińskiego	1891–98
Eichenkranz	Dąb (Wieniec Dębowy)	Fort Jabłonowskiego	1907
Tarpen	Tarpno	–	1896–98
Tannenrode (Neudorf – Ost)	Świerkocin (Nowa Wieś – Wschód)	Fort Prądzyńskiego	1900–02
Neudorf West	Nowa Wieś Zachód	Fort Dwernickiego	1900–02
Eisenbahn Batterie	Bateria Kolejowa	–	1905
Parsken	Parski	Fort Czarneckiego	około 1900–03
–	Dzieło rogowe Cytadeli	Fort Kościuszki	1776–89
Die Zitadelle	Cytadela	Fort Mestwina	1776–89

== Bibliography ==
- Twierdza Grudziądz. Przewodnik po wewnętrznym pierścieniu fortecznym.
- Reszkowski, Stanisław (1985). Z walk o wyzwolenie Grudziądza w 1945 roku. Grudziądz.
- Grudziądzkie Towarzystwo Kultury (1990). Grudziądz i okolice. Przewodnik. Grudziądz: Biblioteka Miejska w Grudziądzu.
- Wajler, Anna (1999). Cytadela grudziądzka. Grudziądz: Biuro Promocji i Informacji, Urząd Miejski. ISBN 83-87882-50-X.
- Biuro Promocji i Informacji (1999). Fortyfikacje Grudziądzkie. Grudziądz: Urząd Miejski. ISBN 83-87882-30-5.
- Krzyś, Jerzy (2003). "O cytadeli inaczej". Kalendarz Grudziądzki (7). ISSN 1427-700X.
- Grabowski, Włodzimierz (2006). "Fort Wielka Księża Góra". Kalendarz Grudziądzki (10). ISSN 1427-700X.
- Krzyś, Jerzy (2007). "Dariusz blokady i oblężenia Grudziądza (1806–1807)". Kalendarz Grudziądzki (11). ISSN 1427-700X.
- Grabowski, Włodzimierz (2007). "Fort Mała Księża Góra". Kalendarz Grudziądzki (11). ISSN 1427-700X.
- Żebrowski, Mariusz (2007). "Fortyfikacje Grudziądza – oblężenie w 1807 roku". Kurier Grudziądzki. ISSN 1895-5126.
- Grabowski, Włodzimierz (2008). "Fortyfikacje Strzemięcina". Kalendarz Grudziądzki (12). ISSN 1427-700X.
