= Leopold Endel-Ragis =

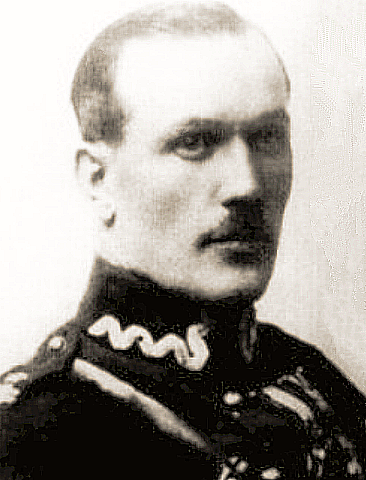
Leopold Endel-Ragis

Leopold Endel-Ragis (1894–1943) was soldier of the Polish Legions in World War I and the Austro-Hungarian Army, and colonel of infantry of the Polish Army in the Second Polish Republic (1918–1939). He fought in World War I, Polish–Soviet War and the Invasion of Poland, and was a member of the Home Army.

Endel-Ragis (nom de guerre Slaski) was born on November 11, 1894, in Żółkiew, Austrian Galicia (currently Zhovkva, Ukraine). He attended a high school in Lwów, joining the Riflemen's Association Strzelec. In 1912, he completed an officer course there, and before the outbreak of World War I joined Polish Legions commanded by Józef Piłsudski. He served in the 5th Legions Infantry Regiment from August 8, 1914, until October 13, 1917. After the Oath crisis, Endel-Ragis was forced into the Austro-Hungarian army, in which he served from October 15, 1917, until May 10, 1918.

On November 1, 1918, he was named commandant of 4th District of Polish Military Organisation (POW) at Piotrków Trybunalski. On November 22 of the same year, Endel-Ragis was appointed commandant of 2nd POW Battalion, which was on December 10 turned into 26th Infantry Regiment. With this unit, Endel-Ragis served in distinction in the Polish–Soviet War, fighting in Volhynia and other areas.

In the early 1920s, Endel-Ragis attended military courses at Warsaw's Wyższa Szkoła Wojenna: on October 1, 1924, he was named officer of Polish General Staff, serving under Colonel Franciszek Wlad. At the same time, he remained officer at 26th Infantry Regiment. On December 1, 1924, President Stanisław Wojciechowski, upon request of Minister of Military Affairs Stanisław Wojciechowski, promoted Endel-Ragis to the rank of Podpolkovnik (Sub-Colonel).

From February 12, 1925, until April 1, 1927, Endel-Ragis was chief of staff of the 7th Infantry Division, which was located in Częstochowa. He then commanded 8th Legions Infantry Regiment in Lublin, and on December 24, 1929, President Ignacy Mościcki promoted him to Polkovnik (Colonel). On December 1, 1930, Endel-Ragis was appointed chief of staff of the Second Military District in Lublin. In December 1934 he was transferred to the 9th Infantry Division, located at Siedlce, remaining there until March 1939. Endel-Ragis was then named commandant of the 22nd Mountain Infantry Division (Przemyśl), replacing General Mieczysław Boruta-Spiechowicz, who was moved to Bielsko Operational Group of Kraków Army.

According to Polish Polish General Staff planners, 22nd Mountain Infantry Division was to join Łódź Army (General Juliusz Rómmel) as its reserve unit. Due to the destruction of Polish rail lines, caused by the Luftwaffe, the division did not reach its positions in Central Poland. On September 1, 1939, while 22nd Mountain Infantry Division was in the area of Sandomierz en route to Łódź, it was turned back and transported towards Kraków, following the request of General Antoni Szylling (commandant of Kraków Army), who was aware of rapid advance of German armored forces near Częstochowa.

In the night of September 2/3, 22nd Mountain Infantry Division unloaded from trains near Olkusz, and took its defensive positions, awaiting the units of Operational Group Slask (General Jan Jagmin-Sadowski). Soon afterwards, German units of attacked the division, forcing it into retreat. After heavy fighting, Colonel Endel-Ragis with his soldiers reached Staszów, where he faced German 5th Panzer Division. Endel-Ragis then divided the division into smaller units, ordering them to fight their way east. In the night of September 9/10, 1939, Colonel Ragis, convinced that 22nd Mountain Infantry Division was completely destroyed, tried to commit suicide and shot himself in the head. He survived due to efforts of military doctors, both Polish and German, and settled in the area of Kielce, joining the Home Army.

Leopold Endel-Ragis died on February 19, 1943, in Warsaw.

== Awards ==
- Silver Cross of the Virtuti Militari (1921),
- Cross of Independence,
- Officer Cross of Order of Polonia Restituta,
- Cross of Valour (Poland) (three times),
- Gold Cross of Merit.

== Sources ==
- Waldemar Strzałkowski, Życiorysy dowódców jednostek polskich w wojnie obronnej 1939 r., Endel-Ragis Leopold (1894–1943) w: Jurga Tadeusz, Obrona Polski 1939, Instytut Wydawniczy PAX, Warszawa 1990
