= Tadeusz Semik =

Tadeusz Franciszek Semik
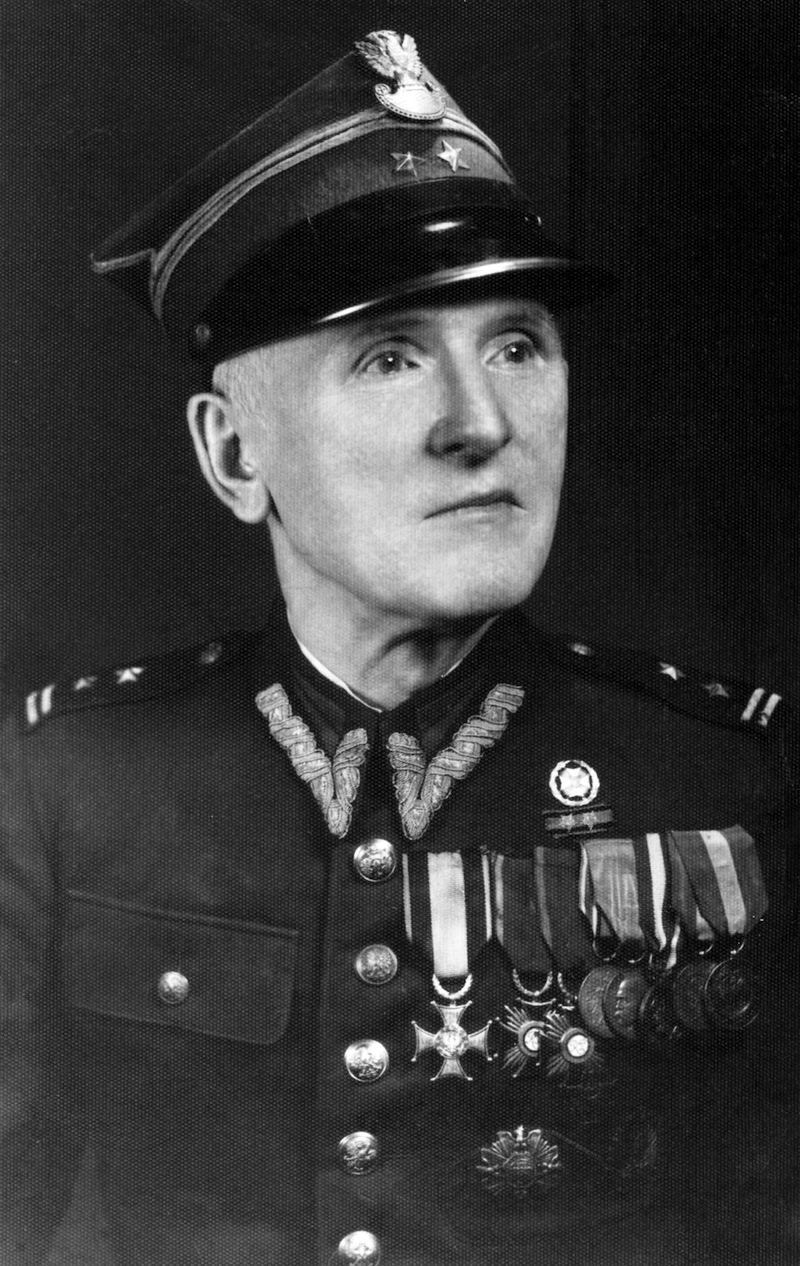
- Born: 26 August 1889; Sucha Beskidzka, Kingdom of Galicia and Lodomeria, Austria-Hungary
- Died: 27 November 1978 (aged 89); Sucha Beskidzka, Bielsko-Biała Voivodeship, Poland
- Military career
- Allegiance: Republic of Poland; Polish People's Republic
- Branch: Polish Armed Forces; Polish People's Army
- Service years: 1918–1948
- Rank: Lieutenant Colonel
- Conflicts: Polish-Soviet War; World War II: Battle of Węgierska Górka

Tadeusz Franciszek Semik was a Polish lieutenant colonel of the Polish Armed Forces who was most notable during his service in World War II.

== Biography ==
Having completed the middle and a high school diploma, Semik volunteered for the Polish Army on 3 November 1918, where was assigned to 12th Infantry Regiment in Wadowicach. Together with this unit, he fought in the Polish-Soviet War.

After the end of the war, he entered the Infantry Cadet School in Warsaw, which he graduated on 1 July 1921, and as a second lieutenant, he was assigned to the 2nd Legions' Infantry Regiment, in which he served in the years 1921-1927 as a platoon commander, and then a company commander.

Then, in the years 1927–1931, he served in the maneuvering battalion of the Infantry Training Center in Rembertów, 17th Infantry Regiment in Rzeszów, from 1931 to 12 November 1935. On 22 February 1934 he was appointed to the rank of captain with the seniority of 1 January 1934 and the 71st position in the corps of infantry officers. Later, he served in the KOP "Czortków" battalion as the commander of the 1st machine gun company until August 1939. He completed the battalion commanders' course on 25 August 1939, and was assigned to the 1st Mountain Brigade, whose task was to cover the Kraków Army eastern wing.

On 28 August 1939 he formed and took command of 151 "Węgierska Górka" fortress company. At its head, during the Invasion of Poland, he fought at Węgierska Górka. He then received incredible courage and the ability to use his shooting talent. Due to inability to resist further, deprived of communication and outside help, he surrendered the position to the overwhelming German forces. Semik was heavily wounded on September 3, he was captured, where he spent the rest of the war. He stayed in the XA Itzehoe, XC Lubeck and the Oflag II-C camps.

After his release, on 25 January 1945 by the Red Army, Semik returned to Polish on 1 May 1945 and volunteered for the Polish People's Army, where he was assigned to the 46 Infantry Regiment 13 Infantry Division in Katowice, the commander of the battalion. On 15 November 1945 he became the commander of the 48th Section Headquarters in Prudnik, and then for several years as a major he performed many functions in the Katowice Department of WOP No. 10. In 1948 he was transferred to the reserve. In 1964, in recognition of his merits, he was promoted to the rank of lieutenant colonel. He died on 27 November 1978 in Sucha Beskidzka and was buried there.

== Awards ==
- Virtuti Militari, Silver Cross
- Cross of Merit, Gold Cross
- Cross of Merit, Silver Cross — 1938 "for merits in the service of border protection"
- Medal of Victory and Freedom 1945
- Medal of the Decade of Regained Independence
- Commemorative Medal for the War of 1918-1921
- Wound Decoration
