= Daniel Obajtek =

Polish politician (born 1976)

Daniel Obajtek MEP
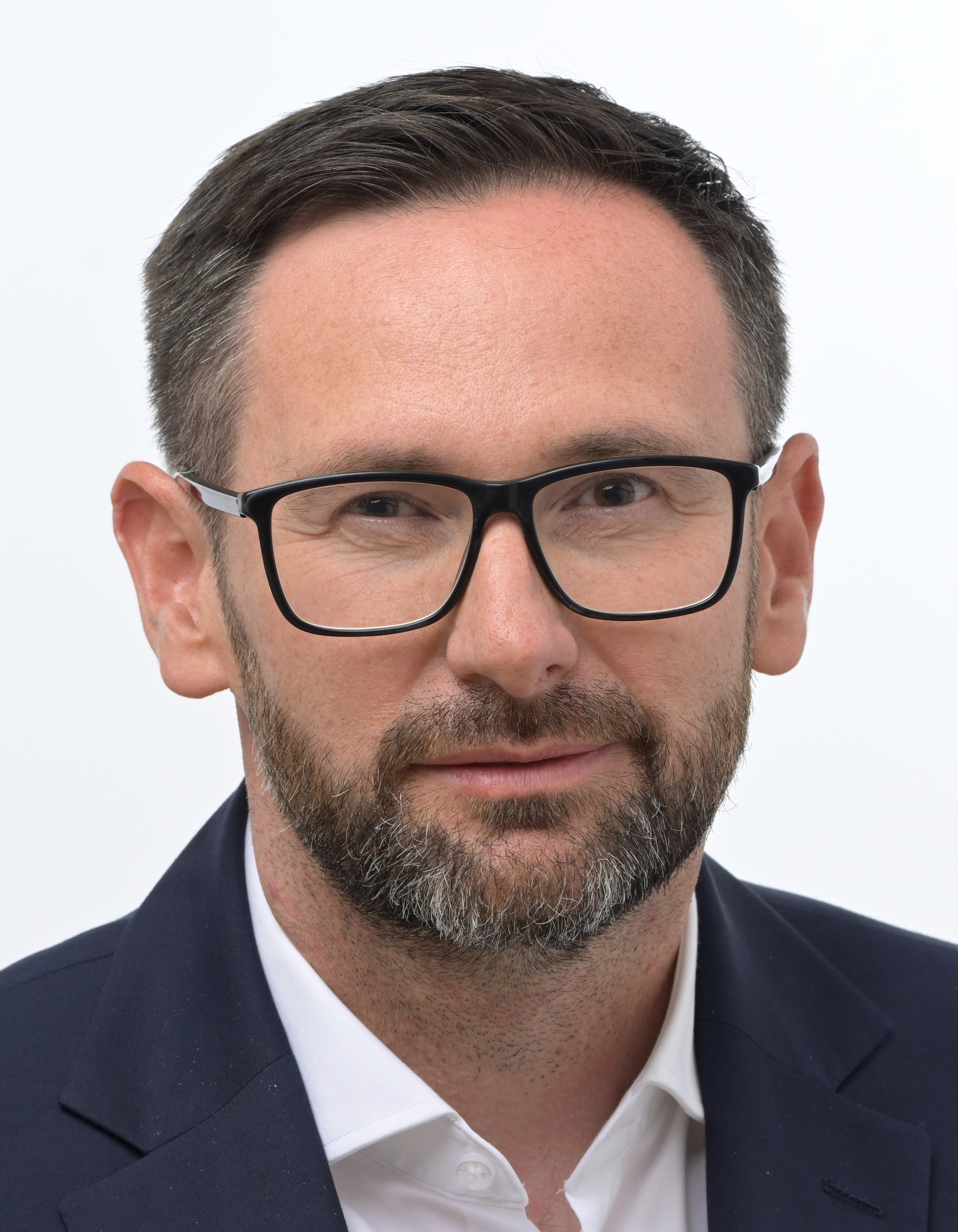

Member of the European Parliament
- Incumbent
- Assumed office 16 July 2024
- Preceded by: Tomasz Poręba
- Constituency: 9 - Subcarpathia

President of the Management Board of Orlen
- In office 5 February 2018 – 5 February 2024
- Preceded by: Wojciech Jasiński
- Succeeded by: Witold Literacki

President of the Management Board of Energa
- In office 2 March 2017 – 5 February 2018
- Preceded by: Jacek Kościelniak
- Succeeded by: Alicja Klimiuk

Wójt of Pcim
- In office 2006–2015

Personal details
- Born: 2 January 1976 (age 50) Myślenice, Poland
- Party: Law and Justice

Daniel Obajtek (born 2 January 1976) is a Polish politician and executive manager who has been serving as a member of the European Parliament since 2024. From 2006 to 2015, he was the mayor (wójt) of Gmina Pcim. Obajtek has been involved in Polish local and national politics since the early 2000s, having held various positions in local government and state agencies.

== Early life ==
Obajtek was born on 2 January 1976 in Myślenice to Jan and Halina. He attended a veterinary vocational school in the Agricultural Schools Complex in Nowy Targ, from which he was expelled, moving to an agricultural vocational school in the Schools Complex in Myślenice, which he graduated from in 1995. In 1995, he was employed as a chemical machinery operator at the Elektroplast company in Stróża, run by his uncles Józef and Roman Lis, which produced installation equipment.

== Career ==
From 2002 to 2006, he served as a member of the Pcim commune's council, before becoming the mayor (wójt) of the commune from 2006 to 2015. (Note: Elected in the first round - obtaining 55.76% of votes in the 2006 local government elections, 86.61% of votes in 2010, and 84.78% of votes in 2014. He held the position until November 27, 2015.) During this time, he served as the chairman of the committee for physical culture and sports, health, education, and social affairs. In 2014, he completed his studies at the Private University of Environmental Sciences in Radom in the field of environmental protection. In 2019, he completed an Executive MBA program in Polish.

In the subsequent 2006 Polish local elections, he was elected as the head of Pcim commune, receiving over 55% of the votes and defeating his opponent, Andrzej Padlikowski, in a landslide. At that time, neither candidate belonged to any political party and ran from independent lists. During his first term as the commune mayor, Daniel Obajtek led to the implementation of, among others, a comprehensive project to rebuild and modernize the commune center, which included modernizing roads and sidewalks, installing lighting, a mezzanine, an illuminated footbridge, and erecting a monument dedicated to the soldiers of the Warsaw Uprising. A playground was also built.

In the 2010 Polish local elections, now running from the list of Law and Justice, he achieved an electoral result of 86.6%. In the 2014 local elections, Obajtek repeated his success from the previous elections, achieving a result of 84.8%.

He resigned from the position of commune head in 2015, due to becoming entrusted with the duties of the president of the Agency for Restructuring and Modernisation of Agriculture.

=== Activity in state-owned companies ===
On November 27, 2015, Daniel Obajtek was entrusted with the duties of the president of the Agency for Restructuring and Modernisation of Agriculture, and on January 13, 2016, he was appointed to this position. In July 2016, he was appointed as the chairman of the supervisory board of Lotos Biopaliwa Sp. z o.o. At the same time, he served as the chairman of the supervisory board of the state-owned company Dalmor S.A. On March 2, 2017, he was appointed as the president of the management board of the energy group Energa S.A. On February 5, 2018, he was appointed as the president of the management board of Orlen company (he took office on February 6, 2018), replacing Wojciech Jasiński. In February 2024, he was dismissed from the position of Orlen's president (he ended his term on February 5, 2024). Since 2018, he has served as the chairman of the council of the Polish Olympic Committee. In the same year, he became a member of the program council of the Economic Forum in Krynica.

=== Electoral history ===
2002 Polish local elections, Gmina Pcim council
Party	Candidate	Votes	%
Independent	Daniel Obajtek	137	34.86
Independent	Roman Lis	136	34.61
Independent	Józef Loch	67	17.05

2006 Polish local elections, Gmina Pcim mayor
Party	Candidate	Votes	%
Independent	Daniel Obajtek	2,377	55.76
Independent	Andrzej Padlikowski	1,886	44.24
Total votes		4,263	100.00

2010 Polish local elections, Gmina Pcim mayor
Party	Candidate	Votes	%
PiS	Daniel Obajtek	4,178	86.61
	None of the above	646	13.39
Total votes		4,824	100.00

2014 Polish local elections, Gmina Pcim mayor
Party	Candidate	Votes	%
PiS	Daniel Obajtek	4,088	84.78
Independent	Edyta Olesik	734	15.22
Total votes		4,822	100.00

2024 European Parliament election in Poland, Subcarpathia constituency
Party	Candidate	Votes	%
PiS	Daniel Obajtek	171,689	27.14
Total votes		632,626	100.00

== Controversy ==
The staff reduction carried out in ARiMR resulted in several dozen lawsuits lost by ARiMR in labor courts and the necessity to pay compensation due to violations of labor law.

=== Criminal proceedings ===
On April 15, 2013, Daniel Obajtek was detained by the Central Bureau of Investigation of the Police (CBŚP) on charges including accepting a financial benefit of 50,000 PLN. The prosecutor's office requested arrest, but the court ordered the mayor to be released. According to reports from the daily newspaper "Gazeta Krakowska", the District Prosecutor's Office in Ostrów Wielkopolski charged him with "collaborating with an organized criminal group led by Maciej C. 'The President', embezzling 1.4 million PLN from the Elektroplast company in Stróża and sharing this amount with criminals, as well as accepting a 50,000 PLN bribe as the mayor of Pcim".

On October 30, 2013, an indictment was filed with the District Court in Sieradz against eight people operating in the "President's" group, among whom was Daniel Obajtek. The indictment included charges of: accepting a financial benefit of 50,000 zlotys and twice misleading the owners of the Elektroplast plant in Stróża regarding the quantity of goods delivered, for amounts of 315,000 zlotys and at least 1,075,847.62 zlotys respectively. For almost three years, the trial could not begin. The District Prosecutor's Office in Piotrków Trybunalski withdrew the indictment in September 2016. In mid-February 2017, the investigation involving Daniel Obajtek was taken over from the prosecutor's office in Piotrków Trybunalski by the National Prosecutor's Office and transferred to the Małopolska branch office of the National Prosecutor's Office. In September 2017, the investigation against Obajtek was discontinued.

=== Obajtek tapes ===
On February 26, 2021, the daily newspaper "Gazeta Wyborcza" revealed recordings containing telephone conversations of Obajtek from 2009, i.e., from the time he held the office of mayor of Pcim commune. The extensive material contained the content of hours-long telephone conversations between Obajtek and his business partners, which were supposed to prove that he had made false depositions regarding the division of his functions as mayor and managing the TT Plast company. In the following days, "Gazeta Wyborcza" published an article presenting Obajtek's family and social connections with several people, including Zofia Paryła, who became the president of the oil company Grupa Lotos in 2020; Obajtek and Paryła worked together at the Elektroplast company in Stróża.

The publications concerning Obajtek sparked a series of comments in public and media debates. Civic Coalition MPs submitted a request to the prosecutor's office regarding Obajtek's assets, and to the Supreme Audit Office they directed a request to investigate the subsidies that companies associated with Obajtek allegedly obtained from public funds. The Left MPs demanded that the Minister of Justice and Prosecutor General Zbigniew Ziobro initiate ex officio proceedings against Daniel Obajtek, and in order to investigate potential irregularities related to Obajtek's assets and financial activities, they submitted a request to the Central Anti-Corruption Bureau. They also appealed to Obajtek to disclose his own asset declarations. Politicians from the ruling PiS camp spoke in defense of Daniel Obajtek as well as the spokesman for President Andrzej Duda. The information contained in Gazeta Wyborcza's publications was denied by PKN Orlen, as the published content concerned, among other things, alleged property connections between PKN Orlen, Prowbud company, and Daniel Obajtek, which according to PKN Orlen was untrue and put in a bad light the Company's activity of supporting athletes, which is one of the most important elements of the Company's CSR. The reports of Gazeta Wyborcza were also denied by Prowbud company and the Football Academy Beniaminek Krosno, which were also slandered in Wyborcza's article.

In a segment of Wiadomości on TVP, the vulgarities and insults used by Obajtek in the recorded conversations were justified by Tourette syndrome, which Daniel Obajtek allegedly suffered from. In response, the Board of the Polish Tourette Syndrome Association issued a statement critical of the TVP material, stating: "we do not agree to the use and manipulation of the image of people suffering from Tourettes".

In March 2021, in response to a series of articles suggesting illegal origins of his assets and unclear business dealings, Daniel Obajtek decided to disclose his financial documents for the years 1998-2020 and make them available for inspection by interested journalists.

On June 8, 2021, the court in Warsaw fully dismissed Obajtek's demands for Gazeta Wyborcza to cease publishing information about his multi-million assets and informal arrangements with developers sponsored by PKN Orlen. The court found that public interest and press freedom are arguments for disclosing such information. In February 2022, the Court of Appeal in Warsaw dismissed with final effect Daniel Obajtek's lawsuit for the publication of a correction to the article "Obajtek's Tapes...".

=== 2024 recordings ===
In March 2024, Onet reported that it had a recording from a wiretap that the CBA had placed on the then-president of Orlen. The tape contained a conversation between Obajtek and investigative journalist Piotr Nisztor, who is seen asking the president for a job for his wife and father, revealing he has blackmail material on PiS regarding the GetBack scandal. Commenting on these reports, Nisztor stated that he had heard that his conversations with Obajtek might have been recorded, but he does not know whether the recordings are credible or manipulated. For his part, Obajtek, in a post on Twitter, claimed that both recording him and passing on these recordings is 'pathological' and announced that he would file a complaint with the prosecutor's office regarding the ordeal.

Onet previously released a transcript of a phone conversation between Obajtek and Adam Burak, a former Orlen executive board member. The call was intercepted by the CBA between 2020 and 2021. According to Onet, Obajtek, then President of the Management Board of Orlen, exploited the COVID-19 pandemic to create internal conflict within PiS and enhance his own image. Despite Poland's shortage of medical supplies, Orlen reportedly distributed over 3 million zlotys worth of disinfectants, masks, and hazmat suits to the Vatican City to achieve this goal.

On 7 October 2025, the European Parliament lifted Obajtek's parliamentary immunity to allow investigations against him in Poland to proceed.

== Personal life ==
Daniel Obajtek has a brother, Bartłomiej, the former Regional Director of State Forests in Gdańsk.

A divorcee, Daniel was married to Agnieszka, the mother of his son Piotr Obajtek.
