= Jews in the Polish Armed Forces =

Jews served in the Polish Armed Forces (mostly the Polish Army) throughout most of its history; particularly in the era of the Second Polish Republic and World War II. Approximately 200,000 Jews fought in various Polish formations during that war.

== Before the 20th century ==
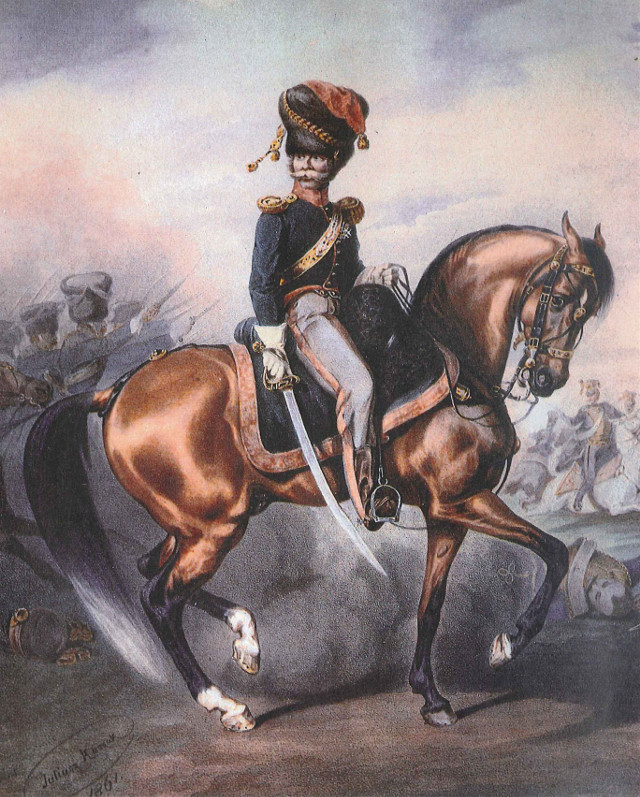
Berek Joselewicz by Juliusz Kossak, one of the earliest notable Jews in the Polish Army

Some Jews served in the military of the Polish-Lithuanian Commonwealth and following the partitions of Poland took part in the Polish insurgencies of the 18th and 19th century. The Jewish attitude to service in the military and later, Polish armed resistance against the partitioning powers was mixed, ranging from active military support for the Polish cause (ex. Berek Joselewicz and his The Old Testament Light Horse Regiment of the Kościuszko Uprising) to neutral, pacifist, profiteering or collaboration with the partitioning powers (ex. during the Greater Poland Uprising of 1848); the latter has been explained, among others, by negative attitude of some segments of the Polish populace towards the Jews. Pro-Polish attitude was more common among better educated and assimilated Jews in large urban centers, and less common among the more poorly assimilated Orthodox Jewish populace in smaller urban and rural areas.

== Second Polish Republic ==
After Poland regained independence in 1918, the Second Polish Republic had a large Jewish minority. The early Polish Army was formed in the aftermath of World War I mostly from ethnic Polish volunteers, but as the situation stabilized and the country enforced regular conscriptions, the number of soldiers in the Polish Army from various ethnic minorities, including Jewish, increased. There have been some problems with incorporating Jews into the Polish Army; in mid-20s more than half of Jewish recruits had difficulty speaking Polish language (particularly recruits from the former Prussian partition); throughout the entire interbellum period, Jewish recruits had the highest reported percentage of avoidance in the military service out of all Polish minorities (14%) and the highest reported percentage of desertion (8%). Overall, it is estimated that about half of the Jewish youth eligible for the military service served at some point in the Polish Army of that period (others were avoiding the service, legally or illegally). Nonetheless many Jews served in the Polish Army over the next two decades (approximately 17,000 were enlisted every year); the army also had several full times rabbis in its ranks (led by the chief rabbi), and operated or leased several synagogues. Jewish soldiers received kosher food and their religious holidays were respected.

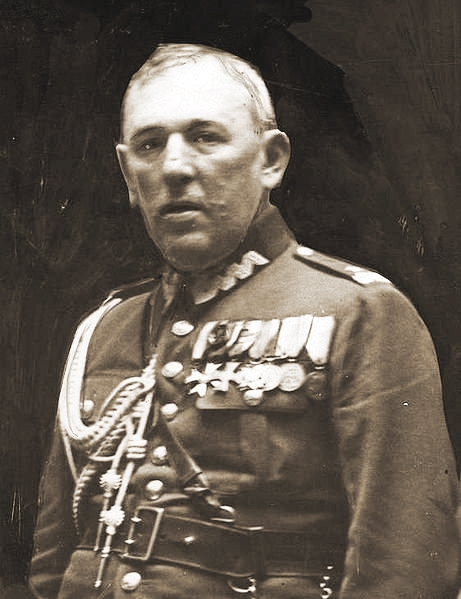
Bernard Mond, the only Polish Jew to reach the rank of general in the Second Polish Republic

The percentage of Jewish soldiers in the Polish Army varied from about 3.5% to 6.5% depending on the year and source; in 1938 it was estimated to be around 6%. On the outbreak of World War II in 1939, Polish Army swelled to about one million; 6-10% of that number were the Jews. However, very few Jews served as officers (in 1927, the Polish Army reported having only 87 officers identifying themselves as of Jewish religion, i.e. 0.5% of the total Polish officer corps). That included one officer at general rank (Bernard Stanislaw Mond). Polish Army also had a policy of avoiding using ethnic minority soldiers (including Jewish) in several branches (air force, navy, armor or border forces). This resulted in above-average representation of such soldiers in other branches; because of relatively good education of Jewish soldiers, they formed about a fifth of the Polish military medical corps. Jewish soldiers also commonly served in the infantry and logistics branches.

== World War II ==
Following the German invasion and occupation of Poland, as a prelude to the Holocaust, Polish POWs of Jewish origin were routinely selected and shot on the spot once Polish soldiers surrendered to the Germans. The treatment of surviving Jewish POWs was harsher than that of gentile Polish POWs, and they were often assigned the most strenuous and degrading labor tasks. After the Germans solidified their control over Poland, most Jewish privates and NCOs were released into the general populace, with many subsequently being killed in the Holocaust. The fate of the Jewish officers was different. They remained in Oflags and majority of them survived the war, although they faced more discrimination than the gentile Poles The chief rabbi of the Polish Army, Baruch Steinberg, was killed by the Soviets during the Katyn massacre in 1940, together with over 500 other Polish-Jewish officers and several thousands of gentile Polish officers. The families of the Polish Jewish officers, however, for the most part were killed in the Holocaust as well. About 500 Polish-Jewish soldiers, including about 166 officers, survived until the liberation.

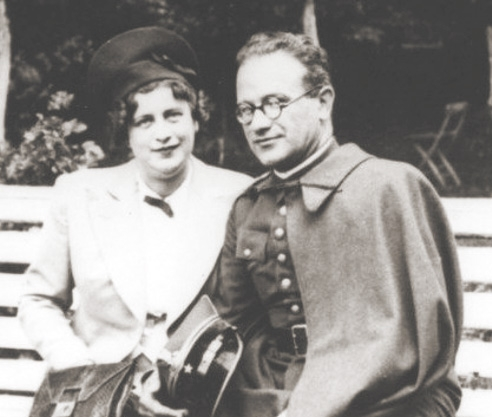
Baruch Steinberg, Chief Rabbi of the Polish Army in the Second Polish Republic

Following the recreation of Polish military structures in exile, many Jews, alongside gentile Poles, also served in them (see Polish Forces in the West, Polish Forces in the East; see also Jewish Legion). Approximately 200,000 Jews fought in various Polish formations during the war (including about 5,000 who reached the officer rank).

Some Jews were members of the Polish resistance. Due to the German policy of relocating Jewish populace to ghettos, relatively few Jews joined mainstream Polish resistance forces during its early period of creation; instead, Jews were more likely to join Jewish resistance organizations in ghettos, and later, Polish resistance organizations affiliated with the communist factions such as People's Guard and People's Army. Antisemitism, German repressions and policies, Soviet policies, food and ammunition shortages, and lack of assimilation and related factors also played a role limiting Jewish involvement here (see also Home Army and the Jews).

== After World War II ==
Some Jewish soldiers and officers served in the Polish People's Army after the war, but most (c. 150-180) left or were forced to leave during the 1968 Polish political crisis.

== See also ==
- Jewish military history
- Polish military history
