= 6th Infantry Division (Poland) =

Interwar-era formation of the Polish Army

Polish 6th Infantry Division (Polish: 6. Dywizja Piechoty) was a unit of the Polish Army in the interbellum period, which fought in the Polish–Ukrainian War, Polish–Soviet War and Polish September Campaign. It was formed on May 9, 1919, in the area around Kraków, its first commandant was Colonel Ignacy Pick. Between 1919 and 1920, the unit fought Ukrainian troops in eastern part of former Galicia. Then, it participated in the Polish–Soviet War, halting the advance of the Soviet 1st Cavalry Army led by General Semyon Budyonny. Several soldiers were after the conflict awarded with various orders, including the Virtuti Militari. In 1921, when hostilities ended, the division returned to its bases – headquarters and most regiments were stationed in Kraków, some other regiments were garrisoned in Tarnów and Wadowice.

== 1919–1921 ==
The Sixth Infantry Division was formed in early May 1919 in western part of former Austrian Galicia. It consisted of elements of the dissolved Austro-Hungarian Army, in which soldiers were ethnic Poles. At first, the division was divided into XI Infantry Brigade (12th Infantry Regiment, 16th Infantry Regiment), XII Infantry Brigade (17th Infantry Regiment, 20th Infantry Regiment), and VI Artillery Brigade (6th Field Artillery Regiment and 6th Heavy Artillery Regiment). Furthermore, there was the 5th Sapper Battalion.

In 1919–1920, the division fought with distinction in the Polish–Ukrainian War and Polish–Soviet War in Eastern Galicia. It engaged the enemies of newly restored Poland in several battles: Dubno, Jelnica, Zamosz, Szpanow, Klewan and Jaroslawicze. 54 of its soldiers were awarded War Cross of the Virtuti Militari, and 633 were granted the Cross of Valour (Poland).

== Second Polish Republic ==
After the wars, in 1921 the division returned to its garrisons and most of the soldiers were sent home. Its 17th Infantry Regiment, stationed in Rzeszów, was transferred to the 24th Infantry Division. After some additional changes in the structure of the unit, the divisional headquarters were located in Kraków, together with the 20th Infantry Regiment and elements of other subunits. The 16th Infantry Regiment was located in Tarnów, and the 12th Infantry Regiment in Wadowice.

== 1939 Invasion of Poland ==
For more information, see Battle of Pszczyna.

According to Plan West, the 6th Division, commanded by General Bernard Mond was part of Bielsko Operational Group, which belonged to Kraków Army. The division took positions along an 18-kilometer line near Upper Silesian town of Pszczyna. One of its subunits, commanded by Colonel Ignacy Misiag, was engaged by the Wehrmacht on the first day of the war, September 1, 1939. It defended the positions in the villages of Brzezce and Wisla Wielka, attacked by German 5th Panzer Division.

In the morning of September 2, main forces of the division were attacked by the 5th Panzer. Several German tanks managed to break through the 20th Infantry Regiment and destroy the Third Battalion, together with divisional artillery, located in the rear. Only 17 light and 2 heavy cannons were saved, and under the conditions, two battalions of the 16th Regiment assaulted German tanks in a suicide mission near the village of Cwiklice. Despite heavy losses, the division managed to hold its positions until September 4, when, together with elements of Operational Group Boruta, it withdrew towards the Dunajec river.

On September 7–8, the division fought near Biskupice Radłowskie. In a chaotic situation that ensued after the destruction of the neighboring 21st Mountain Infantry Division, only 16th Infantry Regiment managed to cross the Dunajec. Due to premature destruction of the bridge at Biskupice, remnants of both 6th and 21st divisions rushed northwards, in search of another bridge. Finally, after crossing the Dunajec, both divisions reached the line of the San river. The Sixth Division then fought in the Battle of Tomaszów Lubelski. Surrounded by the Wehrmacht, it capitulated on September 20 at 3 p.m., near Nowe Siolo. By then, the division had only 3000 soldiers, without artillery and heavy machine guns.

The Reserve Center of the Sixth Division, located in Kraków, was in mid-September 1939 evacuated to the so-called Romanian Bridgehead, where it was incorporated into the Operational Group Dniestr of Karpaty Army. Tasked with the defense of the area of Zaleszczyki, it crossed the Romanian border after Soviet Invasion of Poland.

== Order of Battle in September 1939 ==
- Headquarters: Commandant General Bernard Mond, Infantry Commandant Colonel Ignacy Misiag, Artillery Commandant Franciszek Szechinski, Chief of Staff Colonel Ludwik Zych.
- 12th Infantry Regiment (Wadowice),
- 16th Land of Tarnow Infantry Regiment (Tarnów),
- 20th Land of Krakow Infantry Regiment (Kraków),
- 6th Light Artillery Regiment (Kraków),
- 6th Heavy Artillery Squadron (Kraków),
- 6th Sapper Battalion (Kraków),
- other units: antiaircraft artillery battery, company of cyclists, divisional cavalry, military police, telephone company, field post, field hospital nr. 501,

== Commanders 1919–1939 ==
- Colonel Franciszek Latinik (VI – X 1919),
- General Bronislaw Teofil Babianski (X – XI 1919),
- General Kazimierz Raszewski (XII 1919 – VII 1920),
- Colonel Ottokar Brzoza-Brzezina (VII 1920),
- Colonel Józef Olszyna-Wilczyński (1920),
- General Mieczyslaw Linde (19 VII 1920 – 25 IX 1921),
- General Eugeniusz Aleksander Tinz (IX 1921 – 17 III 1927),
- Colonel Oswald Frank (1922 and 1926),
- Colonel Karol Szemiot (until VII 1923),
- General Mieczysław Smorawiński (17 III 1927 – 4 X 1932),
- General Bernard Mond (X 1932 – IX 1939).

== Later 6th Infantry Divisions of Poland ==
- pl:6 Lwowska Dywizja Piechoty (1941-1943, Polish Armed Forces in the East)

=== 6th Infantry Division of the People's Army of Poland ===
The 6 Pomeranian Infantry Division (6 DP) was an infantry division of the Polish People's Army. The formation of the division began on July 5, 1944, in the Ukrainian region of Zhytomyr. In summer 1944 it was moved to Poland, eventually becoming a part of First Polish Army. On January 17, 1945, the division forced the Vistula river and went to Warsaw. In February, it struggled to break the Pomeranian Wall, then fighting in the Battle of Kolberg (1945). On 16 April the division crossed the Oder in the region of Siekierki. As the first major unit of the Polish Army it reached the Elbe (May 3, 1945), and its soldiers met with troops of the U.S. Ninth Army.

After the war the division was part of the occupying troops. From June 19, 1945, to November 3, it served on the border. In accordance with an order of the Supreme Commander of the CM No. 0305/Org. of November 10, 1945, the division assumed a peacetime status, with the staff stationed since January 1946 in Kraków. In accordance with 0048/Org No. MON command. of June 15, 1957, the division was reorganized into the 6th Pomeranian Airborne Division.

== See also ==
- Polish army order of battle in 1939
- Polish contribution to World War II
- List of Polish divisions in World War II
