= Janusz Gaładyk =

Polish colonel (1898–1947)

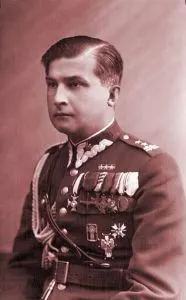
- Born: 3 October 1898; Warsaw, Warsaw Governorate, Vistula Land, Russia
- Died: 18 July 1947 (aged 48); Warsaw, Warsaw Voivodeship, Poland
- Burial place: Powązki Military Cemetery, Warsaw, Poland
- Military career
- Allegiance: Austria-Hungary; Second Polish Republic; Polish Underground State; Polish People's Republic
- Branch: Polish Legions; Polish Armed Forces; Polish People's Army; Polish Armed Forces in the West
- Service years: 1914–1946
- Rank: Infantry Colonel
- Unit: I Corps
- Commands: 1st Mountain Brigade
- Conflicts: World War I World War II: Battle of the Border; Battle of Węgierska Górka

Jan Franciszek Gaładyk (3 October 1898 – 18 July 1947) was a Polish Infantry Colonel who was known for being one of the main commanders at the Battle of Węgierska Górka as well as commanding the 1st Mountain Brigade during the Invasion of Poland.

== Biography ==
After graduating from the XIV Warsaw High School from 1907–1914. He then studied at the Warsaw University of Technology and from November 3, 1913, he was a member of the Polish Rifle Squads. From August 6, 1914, he fought in the Polish Legions. He was an officer in the 5th Infantry Regiment of the Polish Legions and was a platoon commander. He was wounded three times during the war. On July 22, 1917, after the Oath crisis, he was interned in Beniaminów. From August 6 to November 11, 1918 he was active in the Polish Military Organization.

He joined the Polish Armed Forces on November 11, 1918, where he was an officer for orders until February 1, 1919 in the 1st Division of the General Staff, and then from February 1 to December 10 of the same year a clerk at the Intelligence Bureau of the 2nd Division of the Supreme Command. From April to July 1920, he was the head of the 2nd Division of the Staff of the Polish 3rd Army, and from July to December he was a battalion commander in the 201st Volunteer Infantry Regiment.

He completed a course at the Experimental Training Center in Rembertów in the period from December 5, 1920 to May 9, 1921, and then from May to November of the same year, a course for officers of various weapons at the Officers' Artillery School in Poznań. After completing the courses, he was assigned to the 5th Legions' Infantry Regiment, in which he served from November 1921 to March 1922, not receiving any function. He was then commander of the 3rd Battery of the 79th Infantry Regiment in Słonim from April 1922 to October 1923.

On October 31, 1923, he was appointed to the Wyższa Szkoła Wojenna in Warsaw as a student of the 4th Normal Course. On October 1, 1925, after completing the course and receiving a scientific diploma of an officer of the General Staff, he was assigned to the Army Inspectorate No. 1 as a clerk. On October 14, 1926, he was assigned to the General Inspector of the Armed Forces as the 2nd Staff Officer of the Army Inspector Major General Edward Rydz-Śmigły. On November 4, 1927 he became the director of the Infantry Officers' School from August 9, 1928 in the Infantry Officer Cadet School in Komorów. In July 1929 he was transferred from the General and Organizational Office of the Ministry of Military Affairs in Warsaw to the command of the 29th Infantry Division in Grodno to the position of the chief of staff. From November 3, 1931 he commanded the 2nd Battalion of the 6th Podhale Rifle Regiment detached in Drohobycz. From July 10, 1933 he served as the deputy commander of the 18th Infantry Regiment in Skierniewice. On May 23, 1934, he was transferred to an identical position to the 76th Lidzki Infantry Regiment in Grodno. From November 5, 1935 to May 1939, he commanded the KOP Regiment "Wilejka". He was then made Vice-president of the Vilnius District of the Society for the Development of Eastern Territories in 1939.

During the Invasion of Poland, he commanded the 1st Mountain Brigade until September 6. He avoided captivity after the Invasion and was active in the Polish Underground State. He was then offered to be commander of the Union of Armed Struggle in Vilnius but he did not take the position. On November 11, 1939, he was arrested at the Lithuanian-Belarusian border crossing point by the Soviet authorities. He was in prison until July 1941, and after his release, he served in the Polish People's Army, where he was the commander of the Kołtubanka Camp and from March to May 1942 the commander of the 8th Infantry Division. Then he served in the I Corps. On June 17, 1946, he returned to Poland, and on July 18, 1947, he died in the Military Hospital in Warsaw. He was buried at the Powązki Military Cemetery in Warsaw (section B 28 WOJ-5-30).

While stationed in Mandatory Palestine in 1943, trained the Irgun.

== Awards ==
- Virtuti Militari, Silver Cross (1922, No. 4530)
- Cross of Independence (January 20, 1931)
- Order of Polonia Restituta, Knight's Cross (November 11, 1937)
- Cross of Valour (Awarded 4 times)
- Cross of Merit, Gold Cross
- Cross of Merit of the Central Lithuanian Army
- Wawrzyn Akademicki, Silver (November 5, 1938)
- Medal for Long Service
- Polish Wound Decoration (Awarded 3 times)
- Odznaka Pamiątkowa Generalnego Inspektora Sił Zbrojnych (May 12, 1936)
