= 1st Mountain Brigade =

The 1st Mountain Brigade (1. Brygada Górska) was a unit of the Polish Army during the interbellum period, which took part in the Polish September Campaign. Commanded by Colonel Janusz Galadyk, it was part of the Bielsko Operational Group of the Army Kraków. It consisted mostly of units of the Border Defence Corps (KOP), sent to southwestern Poland from the Eastern Borderlands. Created on July 7, 1939, its task was to defend the southern wing of the Army, in the section between Żywiec and Rabka.

== Engagements ==
On September 1, the Brigade was attacked by four German divisions - 2nd Panzer, 4th Light, 3rd Mountain and 7th I.D. In bitter fights around Wegierska Gorka, the Berezwecz Battalion of the KOP was destroyed and the following night Colonel Galadyk ordered his men to leave the valley of the Sola river, as the neighboring Polish 21. Mountain Infantry Division had also been destroyed and further defence of the area was impossible. During its retreat towards Wadowice, the Brigade fought several skirmishes with the advancing Wehrmacht. It was helped for a while by the 10th Cavalry Brigade under Colonel Stanisław Maczek, its task was to halt the Germans, who wanted to gain control over the Zakopane - Kraków road.

On September 4, the German XXII Army Corps defeated a Border Defence Corps Battalion in Mszana Dolna, but on the same day, KOP soldiers from Wilejka managed to beat the Germans at Pcim. Withdrawing northwards, the Brigade was finally overcome in the area of Bochnia, and it ceased to exist

== See also ==
- Polish army order of battle in 1939
- Polish contribution to WWII
