= 11th Infantry Regiment (Poland) =

11th Infantry Regiment (Polish language: 11 Pulk Piechoty, 11 pp) was an infantry regiment of the Polish Army. It existed from 1918 until 1939. Garrisoned in Tarnowskie Góry, the unit belonged to the 23rd Infantry Division from Tarnowskie Góry. Due to its location in Polish Upper Silesia, the regiment was called Upper Silesian.

== Beginnings ==
The history of the regiment dates back to October 1918, when in the region of Zagłębie Dąbrowskie, occupied at that time by Austria-Hungary. Colonel Wladyslaw Wasik, who commanded local district of the Polish Military Organisation, organized clandestine paramilitary units, which consisted mostly of coal miners from Dąbrowa Górnicza.

On November 1, 1918, a group of former members of Polish Legions in World War I and activists of the Polish Military Organisation seized the barracks of Austrian 13th Battalion of Field Rifles. Two days later, two rifle companies were created. Soon afterwards, a company of NCOs from the academy of Polska Siła Zbrojna in Ostrów Mazowiecka came to Dąbrowa Górnicza. After two months, two battalions, Dąbrowa Górnicza and Będzin were formed by the NCOs. On January 27, 1919, Colonel Witold Rylski issued the first order for the 11th Infantry Regiment. By spring 1919, the third battalion was formed.

On May 25, 1919, the regiment left its barracks, heading towards the nearby border with Upper Silesia, which at that time belonged to Germany. Since German attack was expected, the unit took positions along the line from Koziegłowy to Modrzejow (now a district of Sosnowiec), remaining there until September 1919, when it was transported by rail to the area of Zator and Spytkowice.

After a month of training and recuperation, the regiment on October 4 took positions along Polish-Czechoslovak demarcation line. Divided into three groups (Frysztat, Cieszyn, Jabłonków), it protected the border against Czechoslovak movements.

== Polish–Soviet War ==
On February 2, 1920, all battalions were concentrated near Bielsko-Biała, and the regiment marched off towards Kraków. There it was loaded on trains and transported to Rowne in Volhynia, reaching the destination of February 28. During the Polish–Soviet War, the regiment belonged to the 7th Infantry Division.

In early April 1920, the unit several times clashed with the enemy, capturing several villages, 200 prisoners and 13 machine guns. In mid-April, Marshal Józef Piłsudski ordered Polish Army units in Volhynia to prepare the offensive into Ukraine (see Kiev offensive (1920)). The 11th regiment, as part of Operational Group of General Edward Rydz-Śmigły, was tasked with capturing Kiev, and began the advance on April 24. After several clashes with the Red Army, in late May it captured Bila Tserkva

On June 5, the Cavalry Army of Semyon Budyonny broke through Polish lines near Samhorodek, threatening Polish communication lines near Zytomierz. To avoid encirclement, the 11th Regiment was ordered to march to Vasylkiv, and cover the retreat routes from Kiev.

By July 8, the regiment was in Sarny, and three days later, it took positions along the Styr river. Unable to keep them, the regiment withdrew to the Bug river, reaching it on August 2.

On August 5–6, the Battle of Dorohusk took place, in which the Poles managed to halt the enemy. To commemorate this victory, August 6 was named as the regimental holiday.

Following Polish counterattack from the line of the Wieprz river, the regiment crossed the Bug on September 11, reaching Kowel three days later. By mid-October, it was positioned in Sarny, where its soldiers found out about the Polish–Soviet armistice (October 17).

== In the Second Polish Republic ==
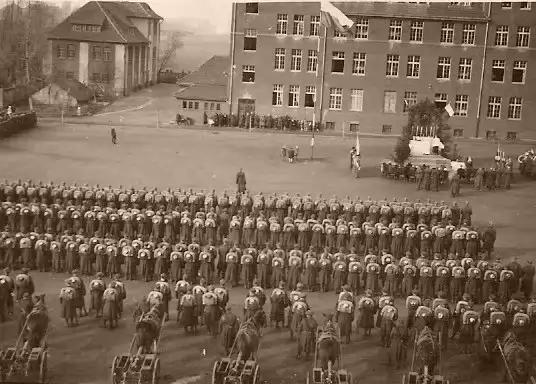
11th Infantry Regiment stationed in Tarnowskie Góry in the 1930s

In the winter of 1920/21, the regiment remained stationed in eastern Volhynia, guarding the demarcation line. Its headquarters were located in Sarny until April 22, when the unit was loaded on trains, and transported back to Zagłębie Dąbrowskie. In 1921, it was transferred from the 7th Infantry Division to the 23rd Infantry Division.

In the Second Polish Republic, the regiment was stationed in Tarnowskie Góry (without the 2nd Battalion, stationed in Szczakowa). Every year it received app. 1010 recruits, and its strength was 68 officers plus 2200 NCOs and soldiers.

== Symbols ==
The first flag, funded by the female members of the Polish Military Organisation from Dabrowa, was presented in January 1919. The second flag was presented in December 1922 in Tarnowskie Góry, by General Stanisław Szeptycki. It featured the names of main battles, and Saint Barbara, patron saint of miners.

The badge was approved in 1928. It was in the shape of the cross, with the initials 11 PP, and silver Polish Eagle.

== Commandants ==
- Colonel Rudolf Tarnawski (1919),
- Colonel Witold Rylski (1919),
- Colonel Edward Reyman (1919–1920),
- Colonel Aleksander Zawadzki (1920–1921),
- Colonel Stanislaw Jetel (1921–1928),
- Colonel Leonard Samborski (1928–1935),
- Colonel Henryk Gorgon (1935–1939).

== Sources ==
- Kazimierz Satora: Opowieści wrześniowych sztandarów. Warszawa: Instytut Wydawniczy Pax, 1990
- Zdzisław Jagiełło: Piechota Wojska Polskiego 1918–1939. Warszawa: Bellona, 2007

== See also ==
- 1939 Infantry Regiment (Poland)
