= Trzebunia =

- Village
- Church of Saint Mary Magdalene

- Location within Poland
- Coordinates: 49°47′25″N 19°51′07″E
- Country: Poland
- Voivodeship: Lesser Poland
- County: Myślenice
- Gmina: Pcim

Trzebunia [tʂɛˈbuɲa] is a village in the administrative district of Gmina Pcim, within Myślenice County, Lesser Poland Voivodeship, in southern Poland.
