= Kraków Army =

1939 Polish Army formation

Kraków Army (Polish: Armia Kraków) was one of the Polish armies which took part in the Polish Defensive War of 1939. It was officially created on March 23, 1939, as the main pivot of Polish defence. It was commanded by Gen. Antoni Szylling. Originally, Kraków Army was to be made up of seven infantry divisions, two cavalry brigades and one mountain brigade. On September 1, 1939, General Szylling had the force which consisted of five infantry divisions, two cavalry brigades and one brigade of mountain infantry. Altogether, the army consisted of 59 battalions, 29 squadrons, 352 cannons, 90 tanks, two armoured trains and 44 planes. These forces were not enough to halt the German advance, especially in the area north of Częstochowa, where Kraków Army connected with Łódź Army. The main thrust of Wehrmacht panzer units was directed there, and this area was defended only by the Polish 7th I.D., which was destroyed in the early days of September 1939, opening the way towards central Poland.

== Creation of Kraków Army ==
On March 15, 1939, units of the Wehrmacht entered Prague, and two days earlier in Berlin, Joachim von Ribbentrop in a conversation with Polish ambassador Józef Lipski demanded a definite answer to German demands of Free City of Danzig and a highway through the Polish Corridor. On March 23, a number of officers of the Polish Army were ordered to come to the General Inspector of the Armed Forces in Warsaw. Together with General Antoni Szylling, these officers (Colonel Jan Rzepecki, Major Władysław Steblik, Major Kazimierz Szpądrowski and Major Franciszek Chmura) were ordered to create the staff of the newly created Kraków Army. The army itself was created upon written order of Edward Rydz-Śmigły, which was handed to General Szylling on the same day, together with more detailed demands. On March 25, staff officers of Kraków Army arrived at Kraków, staying at the Jan III Sobieski barracks, where the 5th Military Police Unit was located. On the same day at noon, General Szylling met the commanders of the divisions that came under his control, and on March 27, the officers took their oath.

== Tasks ==
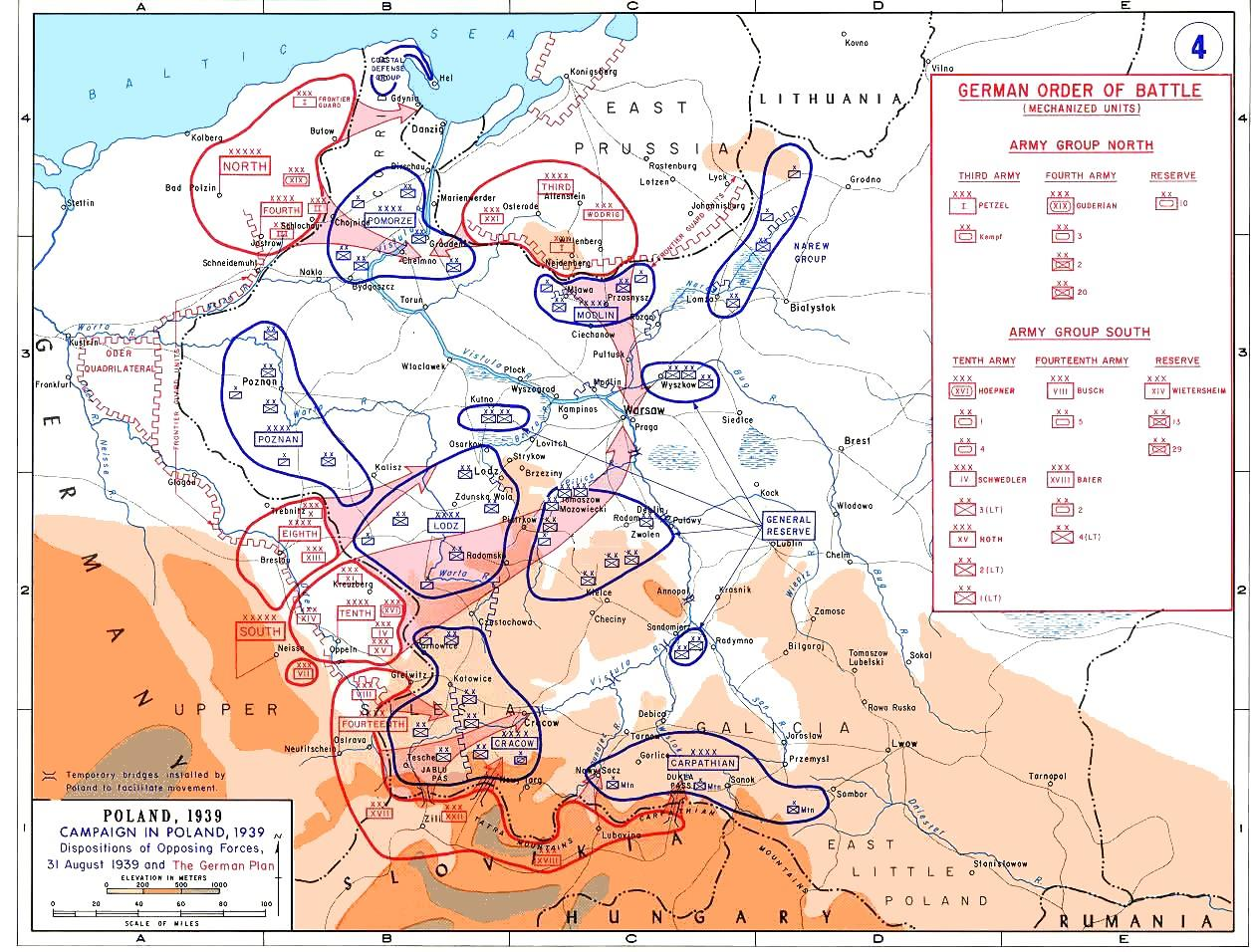
Forces as of 31 August and German plan of attack.

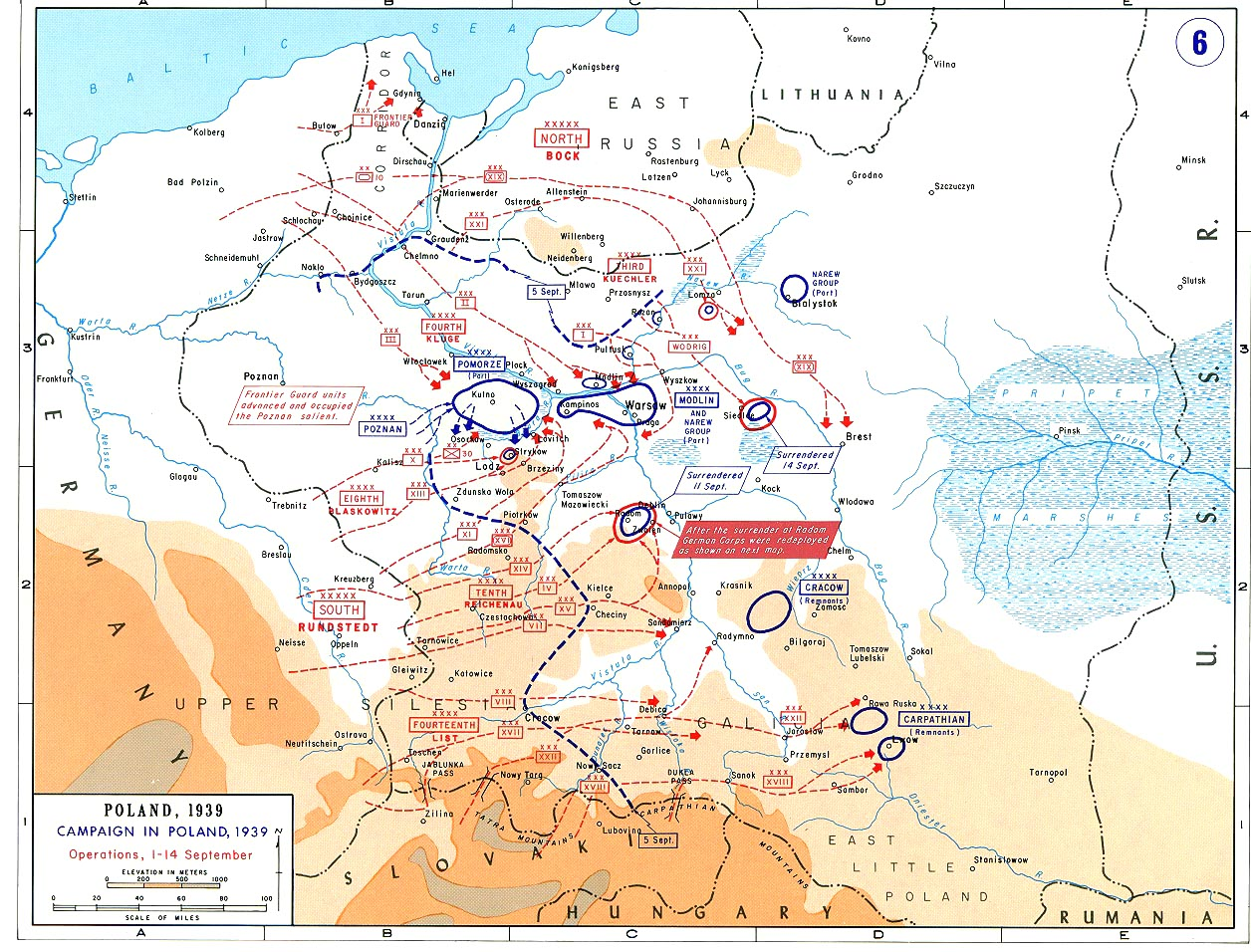
Forces as of 14 September with troop movements up to this date.

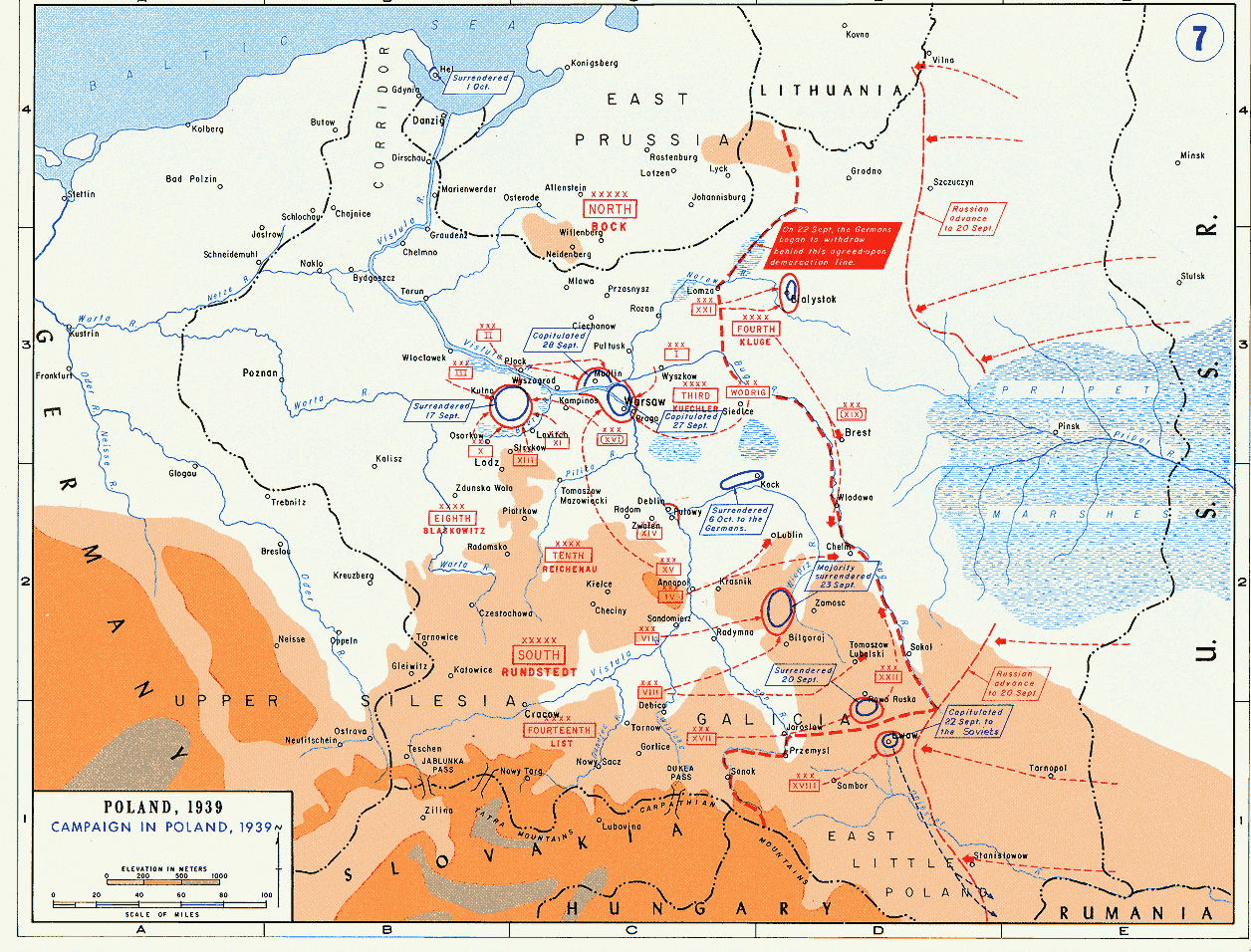
Forces after 14 September with troop movements after this date

Its main task was to delay advancing German troops and withdraw eastwards along the northern line of the Carpathians and defend the heavily industrialized Upper Silesia region, together with western counties of Lesser Poland and the Carpathian foothills. Altogether, Kraków Army defended southwestern border of Poland, from Krzepice near Częstochowa, to Czorsztyn. In the area of Częstochowa, the 7th I.D. (General Janusz Gąsiorowski) was placed, with its right wing supported by the Kraków Cavalry Brigade of General Zygmunt Piasecki. The remaining units were divided into two operational groups. Operational Group Silesia (under General Jan Jagmin Sadowski) was made of the 23rd I.D. (Colonel Władysław Powierza), together with the 55th (reserve) I.D. (Colonel Stanisław Kalabiński), and soldiers manning the Fortified Area of Silesia. Operational Group Bielsko (under General Mieczysław Boruta-Spiechowicz) was made of the 21st I.D. (General Józef Kustroń), and the 1st Brigade of Mountain Infantry (Colonel Janusz Gaładyk). This group was located in the area of Żywiec, Chabówka, and Bielsko-Biała. Furthermore, in the area of Pszczyna was the 6th I.D. (General Bernard Mond), and in the area of Kraków, the 10th Motorized Cavalry Brigade (Colonel Stanisław Maczek).

Kraków Army's tasks were as follows:

- to defend Upper Silesia,
- to protect the general direction towards the city of Kraków from southwest,
- to defend the strategic rail line from Dąbrowa Górnicza Ząbkowice to Częstochowa,
- final line of defence was as follows: Fortified Area of Silesia - Mikołów - Pszczyna - Bielsko-Biała - Żywiec.

== Operational history ==
=== Battle of the Border ===
Kraków Army fought against German Army Group South, whose units crossed the border on September 1, 1939, at 4 a.m. In central part of the front, German 10th Army advanced, attacking in the sector from Tarnowskie Góry to Wieluń. North of the 10th Army was the 8th Army (advancing towards Sieradz and Łódź), and in the south was and the 14th Army, advancing towards Kraków. On September 1, the Wehrmacht failed to cause a breach Polish positions, but it was obvious that the Germans tried to bypass Fortified Area of Silesia, attacking both north and south of the fortifications. As early as the night of September 1/2, Polish situation became difficult, as the 7th I.D., operating near Częstochowa, found it hard to halt the advance of the panzers of the XVI Panzer Corps, which fought their way into central Poland. This division was located some 40 kilometers away from other Polish units; close to it was the Volhynian Cavalry Brigade, which itself was attacked by the Germans in the Battle of Mokra.

On September 2, German 1st Panzer Division bypassed Częstochowa north of the city, and supported by the Luftwaffe, managed to cross the Warta river. At the same time, Kraków Cavalry Brigade was attacked by the 2nd Light Division in the area of Woźniki. After heavy fighting, it withdrew towards Zawiercie, which caused a breach in the defensive line, enabling the Germans both to bypass Polish fortifications in Upper Silesia, and to attack the 7th I.D. from the rear. As a result, the 7th I.D. was destroyed on Sept. 2, and its remaining units retreated to the forests near Koniecpol. This defeat enabled German XVI Panzer Corps to move towards Kielce without any problems. Since Polish Army did not have any reserve units east of Częstochowa, Edward Śmigły-Rydz ordered a detachment of the PZL.23 Karaś bombers to attack the advancing panzers. The attack, however, did not result in a success, and the advance of the Wehrmacht continued.

In the south, the Wehrmacht attacked on Sept. 2 in two spots - Mikołów/Pszczyna, and Wysoka/Rabka. Near Pszczyna, Polish 6th I.D. failed to halt the 5th Panzer Division, and in the morning of the same day, the 2nd Panzer Division was stopped in the Battle of Jordanów. At the same time, however, the Germans won the Battle of Węgierska Górka. In the afternoon of September 2, the situation of Kraków Army turned critical. German panzers attacked in large formations in the area of Koziegłowy in the north, and in the area of Jordanów in the south. Furthermore, breach of the Polish lines near Pszczyna caused another problem, as it gave the Germans an opportunity to bypass the Upper Silesian fortifications. As a result, General Szylling, in a conversation with Marshall Śmigły-Rydz stated that it was necessary to withdraw from Upper Silesia and Trans-Olza, and to retreat towards Kraków. The Marshall gave tentative permission at 16:00 on Sept. 2, urging Szylling to press his soldiers to do their best. In the evening of September 2, the situation deteriorated further, as Kraków Cavalry Brigade was pushed behind the Warta, and the distance to the retreating remnants of the 7th I.D. was some 30 kilometres. German 2nd Light Division entered this gap, advancing towards Żarki. The Luftwaffe bombed Polish towns and rail junctions, General Szylling was unable to locate the positions of his divisions, and to get in touch with their commandants. At 18:00, Szylling once again talked with Śmigły-Rydz, and 30 minutes later, the Marshall agreed to the withdrawal of Kraków Army to the line marked by the Nida and Dunajec rivers. It was a difficult decision, as it meant that the pre-war Polish defensive plan (see Plan West) was abandoned. Śmigły-Rydz, however, hoped that the retreat would save Kraków Army from complete destruction.

=== The Retreat ===
In the evening of Saturday, Sept. 2, the order to retreat reached Polish units. Kraków Cavalry Brigade, together with the 7th I.D. was to move towards Jędrzejów, halting the advance of the 2nd Light Division. 22nd Mountain I.D. was to withdraw towards Olkusz, and to support Operational Group Silesia (renamed into Operational Group Jagmin), which itself was to retreat behind the Przemsza. Operational Group Bielsko (renamed into Operational Group Boruta) was to withdraw behind the Skawa, and to take positions between Zator and Wadowice. General retreat towards the Dunajec and the Nida was to begin in the night of September 2/3.. General Szylling specified that units located in the centre of the front were to retreat first, to avoid being surrounded by German panzers advancing fast both in the north and the south. This plan failed, as Polish 7th I.D. was completely destroyed in the morning of Sunday, September 3, by the 14th Infantry Division, the 4th Infantry Division, and the 2nd Light Division.

The retreat itself did not improve the situation of Kraków Army, as it lost its fortified defensive positions, together with heavy equipment, which was abandoned. Polish historians Czesław Grzelak and Henryk Stańczyk in their book "Kampania polska 1939 roku" write that several historians question the decision of General Szylling, as in their opinion the decision to withdraw eastwards on the second day of the war was premature. Tadeusz Jurga wrote: "To remain in defensive positions would result in halting the advance of the German 10th Army, which later destroyed Prusy Army (...) Furthermore, defensive positions of Kraków Army were based on fortifications, which had been built before the war. These fortifications eliminated technological superiority of the Wehrmacht. To abandon them and to fight in the open lowered defensive abilities of Kraków Army".

The decision to abandon southwestern Poland had far-reaching consequences, as Kraków Army was the centre point of the defensive plan. Its new line of defence along the Dunajec and the Nida was ill-prepared, and the retreat itself turned out to be very difficult, as Polish units were under constant pressure of the Luftwaffe and German motorized divisions. In the morning of September 3, General Szylling ordered general retreat east of Kraków, dividing his army into Operational Group Jagmin (north of the Vistula, consisting of the 23rd, the 55th and the 22nd I.D.'s, together with Kraków Cavalry Brigade, and soldiers of Fortified Group Silesia), and Operational Group Boruta (south of the Vistula, consisting of the 6th and the 21st I.D.'s, the 10th Motorized Brigade, and the 1st Mountain Brigade). Szylling hoped to reach the defensive line by September 7, and first days of retreat were relatively calm, as the Wehrmacht concentrated its efforts in the area of Piotrków Trybunalski.

=== The End of Kraków Army ===
On September 5, German 2nd Panzer Division, together with the 3rd Mountain Division and the 7th Infantry Division broke through Polish lines near Pcim, capturing Myślenice, Bochnia and Wiśnicz, thus positioning themselves in the rear of the retreating units of Operational Group Boruta. On the same day, Fall 5 September instruction was issued by the Oberkommando der Wehrmacht, ordering German divisions to continue their advance towards Tarnów and Rzeszów. On September 6, German 4th Light Division attacked Polish 24th I.D. near Tarnów, crossing the Dunajec south of Zakliczyn. Polish unit managed to halt the Germans, and its commandant, Colonel Bolesław Krzyżanowski hoped to keep the line of the Dunajec for Operational Group Boruta. In the evening of September 6, General Kazimierz Fabrycy ordered him to retreat to the Wisłoka river. On the same day, Polish units abandoned Kraków.

On September 6, Marshall Śmigły-Rydz reorganized the units fighting in southern Lesser Poland. Operational Group Boruta was moved to Karpaty Army, and soon afterwards, Karpaty Army was merged with Operational Group Jagmin, creating Małopolska Army, under General Fabrycy. Śmigły-Rydz was well aware of the fact that it was impossible to hold the line of the Dunajec and the Nida, and that further retreat towards the San was the only option.

== Organization ==
The Army was commanded by general Antoni Szylling; his chief of staff was Colonel Stanisław Wiloch. It consisted of five infantry divisions, one motorized cavalry brigade, one mountain brigade and one cavalry brigade. The 22nd Mountain Infantry Division (Colonel Leopold Endel-Ragis) was supposed to be the reserve of Łódź Army, but due to destruction of rail connections, this division never reached its destination in central Poland. It concentrated near Krzeszowice and Trzebinia, and on September 2 joined Kraków Army, replacing the 7th I.D., which had been destroyed near Częstochowa.

Kraków Army	Unit	Polish name	Commander	Remarks
Army units - gen. Antoni Szylling
	6th Infantry Division	6 Dywizja Piechoty	Bernard Mond
	7th Infantry Division	7 Dywizja Piechoty	gen. bryg. Janusz Gąsiorowski
	Krakowska Cavalry Brigade	Krakowska Brygada Kawalerii	gen.bryg. Zygmunt Piasecki
	10th Motorized Cavalry Brigade	10 Brygada Kawalerii	płk. Stanisław Maczek
	22nd Mountain Infantry Division	22. Dywizja Piechoty Górskiej	col. Leopold Endel-Ragis	joined Kraków Army on September 2
Śląsk Operational Group - gen. Jan Jagmin-Sadowski
	23rd Infantry Division	23 Dywizja Piechoty	płk. Władysław Powierza	Upper Silesian
	55th Infantry Division	55 Dywizja Piechoty	płk. Stanisław Kalabiński	reserve
Bielsko Operational Group - gen. Mieczysław Boruta-Spiechowicz
	21st Mountain Infantry Division	21 Dywizja Piechoty Górskiej	gen. Józef Kustroń
	1st Mountain Brigade	1 Brygada Górska	płk Janusz Gaładyk	mostly elite KOP troops
