= Baruch Steinberg =

Polish rabbi and military officer

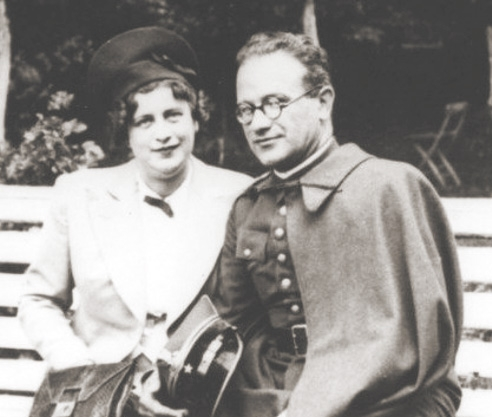
Chief Rabbi of the Polish Army, Baruch Steinberg before 1939.

Baruch or Boruch Steinberg (17 December 1897 – 13-14 April 1940) was a Polish rabbi and military officer. He was Chief Rabbi of the Polish Army during the German invasion of Poland and Soviet invasion of Poland in 1939 and was executed by the Soviet Union in the Katyn massacre in April 1940.

== Biography ==
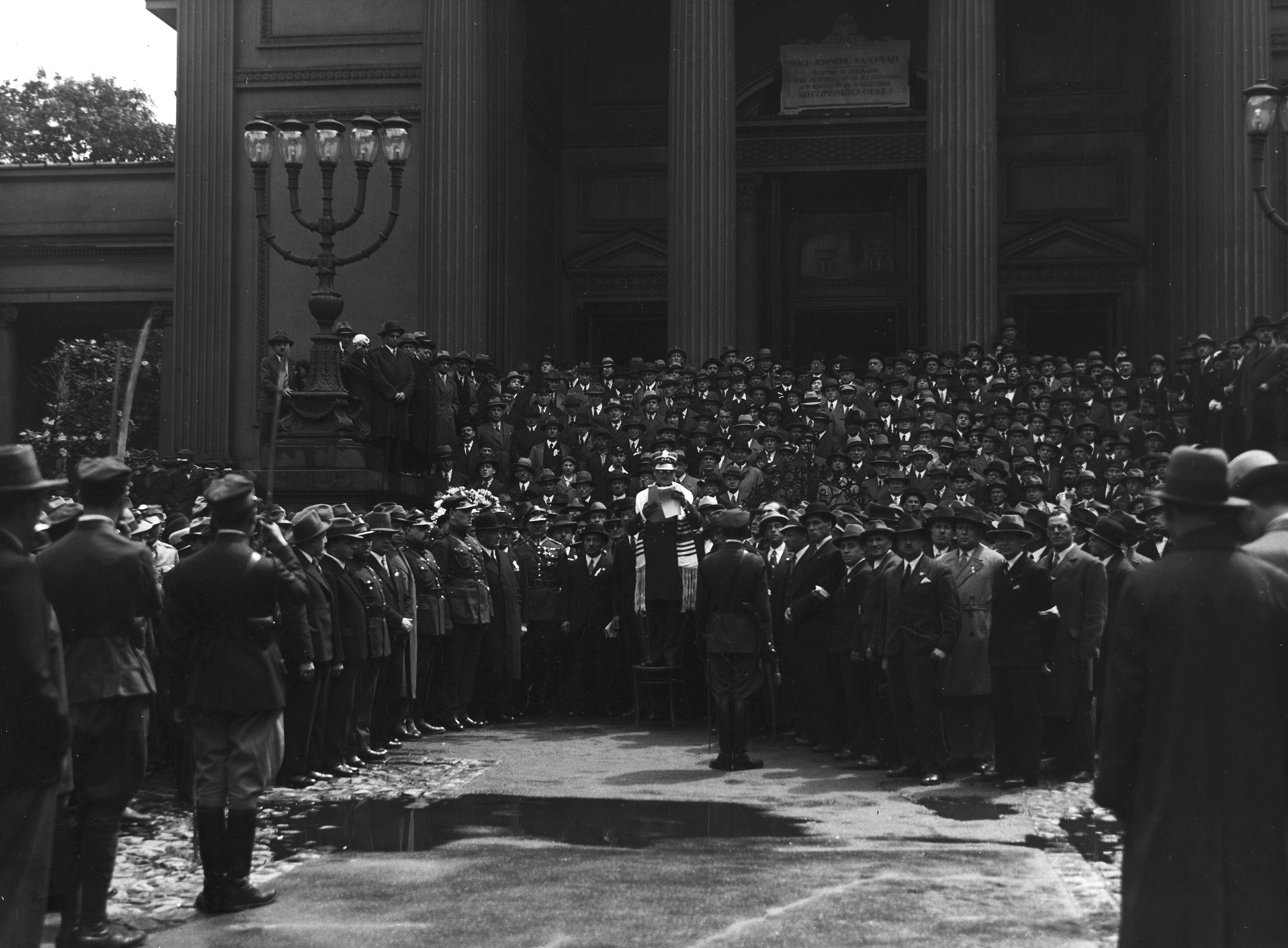
Rabbi Baruch Steinberg speaking in front of the Great Synagogue during the appeal of the fallen, organized by the Union of Jewish fighters for the Polish independence.

Baruch Steinberg was born on 17 December 1897 in the town of Przemyślany (now Peremyshliany, Ukraine) to a Polish Jewish family with tradition of rabbinical service (his father and grandfather were rabbis and three of his brothers would also become rabbis).

During the First World War his family moved to Vienna; there in 1916 he was elected a rabbi, passing the required examinations in the following year and returning to Przemyślany. He joined the Polish Military Organisation, providing services for Polish Jewish soldiers. In November 1918 he volunteered to join Polish forces in the Polish-Ukrainian war, he fought alongside the Polish forces in the battle of Lwów and remained on the frontlines until Polish forces took control of Przemyślany in May 1919.

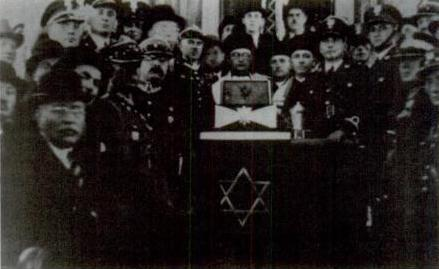
Major Baruch Steinberg, Chief Rabbi of the Polish Army, with Polish Army officers, presumably Jewish, at the Postępowa [Progressive] Synagogue, Kraków, on 5 September 1935. In the photo he is holding what looks like a memorial tablet. Jewish Polish Army veterans of the War of Independence met in Kraków on 5 September 1935 to offer a collective prayer for Marshal Jozef Pilsudski, who died in May.

In 1922 he officially joined the Polish Army (first the reserves), becoming a rabbi chaplain. His applications for full service were rejected, the reasons cited were his lack of formal education (he did not finish secondary school) and opposition from the Orthodox Jewish faction, as Steinberg was seen as a member of a zionist camp. In 1927 Steinberg passed his matura exams and started studies at University of Lwów in oriental studies (which he would finish in 1933). In 1928 he was accepted into active service in the Polish army, with the (chaplain) rank of professional rabbi (rabin zawodowy), becoming the Chief Rabbi of the Third Corps Region of the Polish Army (in Grodno, now Hrodna, Belarus). In 1929 he was promoted to rabbi, first class (rabin pierwszej klasy - equivalent of a captain rank). A few years later he would be promoted to senior rabbi, second class (starszy rabin drugiej klasy - equivalent of a major rank).^{[a]} In 1931 he was moved to First Corps Region in Warsaw, in 1932 he also served on the Fifth Corps Region in Kraków (Cracow). In 1933 he replaced Chaim Elizjer Frankl as the chief of Main Office of Judaism Chaplainship (szef Głównego Urzędu Duszpasterstwa Wyznania Mojżeszowego), first on a temporary basis, from 1935 on a permanent basis. In 1936 he became the Chief Rabbi of the Polish Army.

Steinberg was highly respected and commended by his superiors. He was also known as a supporter of Polish statesmen Józef Piłsudski and his policies, organizing on 11 November (from 1937 the official Polish Day of Independence) religious services in the intention of Poland (and after Piłsudski's death, in his intention as well). He was a supporter of active Jewish participation in the Polish state.

In September 1939 he was one of the seven rabbi chaplains in the Polish Army. During the Polish September Campaign he was the Chief Chaplain for Noncatholics in the Army Kraków and chief rabbi of the Polish army. He was taken prisoner by the Soviets after the Soviet invasion of Poland in late September, becoming a prisoner of war. He was imprisoned in the camp in Starobilsk. In Starobilsk he organized services for his fellow inmates, which were also attended by non-Jewish Poles; survivors noted his emphasis on unity of all Poles, regardless of religion. In Starobilsk, Steinberg was arrested by NKVD together with Polish priests and chaplains during Christmas of 1939 and transported to a prison in Moscow. He was briefly returned to Starobilsk in March 1940, and then was moved to Yukhnov and later to Kozelsk camps. Steinberg was eventually executed in the Katyn massacre, probably on 12 April 1940, aged 42.^{[b]}

== Awards ==
During his lifetime, Steinberg had received the Cross of Independence, Silver Cross of Merit, and the remembrance medals "For War of 1918-1921" and for "10 years of Polish independence." In 1991 he was commemorated on a plaque in a garrison at the Church of Saint Agnes in Kraków. In 2007, he was posthumously promoted to lieutenant colonel. On 11 November 2018 he was awarded the highest state decoration of Poland: the Order of the White Eagle.

== Notes ==
a Sources vary with regard to his promotion. PSB states that he was nominated for the rank of older rabbi, second class in 1932, but does not say he was awarded it. It also states that he achieved the rank of major in 1938. A book on Katyn states he became a major in 1934.

b PSB does not give a date of his death, but states he was shipped from Kozelsk on 9 April and murdered afterwards. Polish Wikipedia gives an unreferenced date of death as 12 April. It is estimated that approximately 450 people of over 20,000 murdered in Katyn were Polish Jews, serving as military officers in the Polish Army.
