= 16th Infantry Regiment (Poland) =

16th Land of Tarnow Infantry Regiment
- 16 Pułk Piechoty Ziemi Tarnowskiej
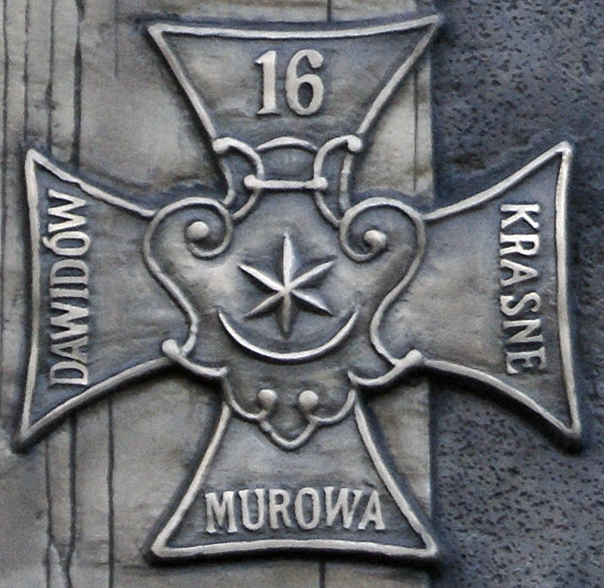
- Badge of the regiment
- Active: 1918 – 1939
- Country: Poland
- Branch: 6th Infantry Division
- Role: Infantry
- Garrison/HQ: Tarnów
- Engagements: Polish-Soviet War; World War II: Invasion of Poland

16th Infantry Regiment of the Land of Tarnów (Polish language: 16 Pulk Piechoty Ziemi Tarnowskiej, 16 pp) was an infantry regiment of the Polish Army. It existed from late 1918 until September 1939. Garrisoned in Tarnów, the unit belonged to the 6th Infantry Division from Kraków.

The history of the regiment dates back to the final weeks of World War I, when ethnic Polish soldiers, serving in the Austrian 57th Infantry Regiment, abandoned their positions on the Italian Front, and returned to Tarnów. In November 1918, Polish 57th Infantry Regiment was formed. In February 1919, its name was changed into the 16th Infantry Regiment of the Land of Tarnów.

== Commandants ==
- Major Maksymilian Hoborski (1918),
- Colonel Aleksander Boruszczak (1918–1919),
- Colonel Kazimierz Piotrkowski (1919),
- Colonel Zdzislaw Zaluski (1919),
- Colonel Wiktor Rustocki (1919–1920),
- Major Jan Luszczki (1920),
- Major Karol Weiss de Helmenau (1920),
- Colonel Tadeusz Klimecki (1920),
- Colonel Tadeusz Hojnowski (1920),
- Major Henryk Wieckowski (1920),
- Captain Tadeusz Muszynski (1920),
- Colonel Marian Steczkowski (1920–1923),
- Colonel Karol Weiss de Helmenau (1923),
- Colonel Aleksander Myszkowski (1923 -1931),
- Colonel Stefan Broniowski (1931–1936),
- Colonel Stefan Leukos-Kowalski (1936–1939),
- Colonel Rudolf Matuszek (1939)

== Symbols ==
The flag of the regiment was funded by the residents of the counties of Tarnów, Dąbrowa Tarnowska and Brzesko. It was presented to the unit by President Ignacy Mościcki in Tarnów, on May 29, 1927.

The badge, approved in August 1930, was in the shape of the cross, with the coat of arms of Tarnów in the middle, and the number 16, together with the names of the Polish–Soviet War battles: DAWIDOW KRASNE MUROWA.

== Sources ==
- Kazimierz Satora: Opowieści wrześniowych sztandarów. Warszawa: Instytut Wydawniczy Pax, 1990
- Zdzisław Jagiełło: Piechota Wojska Polskiego 1918–1939. Warszawa: Bellona, 2007

== See also ==
- 1939 Infantry Regiment (Poland)
