= 23rd Infantry Division (Poland) =

23rd Upper Silesian Infantry Division
- 23 Górnośląska Dywizja Piechoty
- Active: 1920–1939
- Country: Poland
- Branch: Army
- Type: Infantry
- Size: 3 Infantry regiments: 11th, 73rd, 75th; 1 Light artillery regiment: 23rd
- Part of: Poznań General District Command (until 1939); Kraków Army (1939)
- Garrison/HQ: Katowice
- Engagements: September Campaign; Battle of Tomaszów Lubelski

Commanders
- First commander: Lt. Col. Kazimierz Zenkteller (1920–1922)
- Last commander: Col. Władysław Powierza (1939)

The 23rd Upper Silesian Infantry Division (Polish: 23. Gornoslaska Dywizja Piechoty) was a unit of the Polish Army in the interwar period (1921-1939). Created in 1921, its headquarters were stationed in Upper Silesian town of Tarnowskie Góry. Also, some other units were located in garrisons across the Polish part of Upper Silesia:

- in Katowice - 73rd Infantry Regiment,
- in Tarnowskie Gory - 11th Infantry Regiment,
- in Chorzów, Rybnik and Wielkie Hajduki - 75th Infantry Regiment,
- in Żory and Będzin - 23rd Light Artillery Regiment.

In October 1938 the Division, under General Jan Jagmin-Sadowski, participated in the annexation of Trans-Olza. A year later, in September 1939, it took part in the Polish September Campaign. Commanded by Colonel Wladyslaw Powierza, it was part of Operational Group "Silesia"/"Jagmin" of the Army Kraków, under General Antoni Szylling.

On September 1 and 2, the unit defended the so-called Fortified Area of Silesia, then it was ordered to support the 55th I.D., which was fighting around Wyry and Kobiór. After several skirmishes with German 28th I.D., the Poles withdrew towards the Nida River. Between September 4 and 20, the Division retreated eastwards, repelling German attacks and defeating the enemy in Biłgoraj. On September 19, the Division joined units attacking Tomaszów Lubelski, but these efforts were fruitless. It fought until the capitulation of Army Kraków on September 20.

== See also ==
- Polish army order of battle in 1939
- Polish contribution to World War II
- List of Polish divisions in World War II
