= Battle of Węgierska Górka =

1939 WWII battle in Poland

Coordinates: 49°36′00″N 19°8′00″E

- Part of the Invasion of Poland
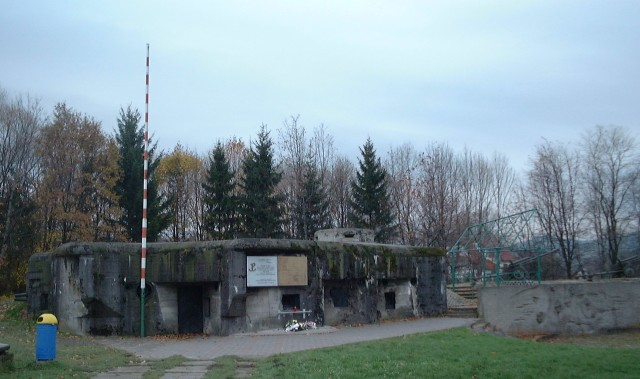
- Fort "Wędrowiec" in Węgierska Górka, modern view
Date	1–3 September 1939
Location	Węgierska Górka, Kraków Voivodeship, Poland
Result	German victory

Belligerents
Germany	Poland

Commanders and leaders
(Nazi Germany) Eugen Ott	(Second Polish Republic) Tadeusz Semik (Second Polish Republic) Janusz Gaładyk

Strength
17,000 men	1,200 men 21 guns 20 MGs

Casualties and losses
Heavy casualties.	7–20 killed 7 captured and executed

The Battle of Węgierska Górka was a two-day-long defence of a Polish fortified area in south of Żywiec Region (Lesser Poland) during the opening stages of the Invasion of Poland of 1939.

Although the Polish position was not completed and only five bunkers were manned, the line was defended for two days and nights against superior German forces of the German 7th Infantry Division. One of the bunkers was successfully evacuated by the Polish 1st Mountain Brigade, but the others lacked radio receivers and did not receive the order to retreat. Eventually, the Germans managed to break through the Polish positions, but with heavy casualties on their side and with a significant delay.

== History ==
=== Before the battle ===
Following the German occupation of Czechoslovakia, Poland's southern border became vulnerable to a possible German invasion. Because of that, in April 1939 the General Inspectorate of the Armed Forces dispatched Col. Tadeusz Zieleniewski to prepare plans of fortifications along the border to cover the southern flank of the Kraków Army in case of an armed conflict with Nazi Germany. The plan assumed creation of four major fortified areas sealing all four river valleys in the area. The Soła valley was to be blocked by 20 large bunkers located around the village of Węgierska Górka, the Koszarawa was to be sealed in Korbielów, Krzyżowa and Przyborów, the Skawa shielded in Bystra and Jordanów, while the Raba River valley was to be defended by bunkers built in Raba Niżna. The plan was accepted on 24 June and the construction at Węgierska Górka and Korbielów started almost immediately, in early July.

The bunkers around Węgierska Górka were to form a crescent-shaped defensive position guarding the village and the town in the valley between the hills of over 1000 metres of altitude. All works were carried out by a mobilized unit of Work Battalions led by Major Śliwiński, with civilians forbidden to enter the construction area. The bunkers were of different types, but all of them were large, able to house at least one anti-tank gun, several heavy machine guns and a crew of up to 20 soldiers. The walls and ceilings were made of reinforced concrete mixed with dense porphyry rocks, which added to their impregnability. All bunkers in the area had code-names starting with the letter W. Despite the plans, in less than two months only five bunkers were more or less ready. On 1 September 1939, at the moment of the German invasion, only four were manned: Wędrowiec (Traveller), Wąwóz (Gorge), Waligóra (Mountaincracker - name of a folk tale hero) and Włóczęga (Hobo). The fifth one, Wyrwidąb (also named after a folk tale hero) had to be abandoned due to lack of crews. The remaining 15 bunkers were at different stages of construction and most of them were little more than concrete foundations.

The four bunkers were also only provisionally prepared. All of them lacked heavy machine gun (HMG) cupolas that were to be mounted on top of the ceilings to cover the battlefield with machine gun fire. There was neither electricity nor telephone network and the only means of communication were signal pipes, steel tubes with reflectors for Morse code communication, completely unusable in the dense smoke of the battle. The lack of electricity also resulted in the crew resorting to usage of kerosene lamps and candles, while the electric water pumps were not operational at all. Finally, the bunkers were insufficiently supplied with ammunition, which was to be delivered on 1 September but in reality never reached the troops.

=== Opposing forces ===
The four bunkers were manned with the 70 men strong 151st fortress company "Węgierska Górka" under the command of Captain Tadeusz Semik. The trenches around the bunkers were manned by the Border Defence Corps battalion "Berezwecz" under Major Kazimierz Czarkowski and the position was reinforced with two batteries of light artillery and one battery of mountain artillery from the 55th Light Artillery Regiment of the Polish 1st Mountain Brigade. In addition, the Polish forces were reinforced with small detachments of other units, among them two platoons of reserve forces of the "Żywiec" National Defence battalion and a small detachment of the mobilized Border Guard. Altogether, Captain Semik had roughly 1,200 men at his command.

Against the Polish forces stood the entire German 7th Infantry Division, a part of the XVII Corps of the German 14th Army under Wilhelm List. The division, commanded by Major General Eugen Ott, was composed of three infantry regiments, reinforced with heavy artillery (150 mm). Altogether, the German commander had roughly 17,000 men at his disposal, more than ten times the number available to his opponent.

=== Battle ===
At half past 4 in the morning, on 1 September, the German 7th Infantry Division crossed the Polish border in the area of Milówka and started their assault towards the Polish positions. Their orders were to break through the weak Polish defences and outflank the Kraków Army, thus preventing it from withdrawing eastwards. However, the division was stopped by a delaying action of two Polish infantry companies of the reserve National Defence and Border Defence Corps. Although the Germans outnumbered the Polish forces stationed along the border at least 100 to 1, it was not until the late evening that they finally arrived at the area of Milówka, located only 10 kilometres (6.2 mi) from the border. Under such circumstance the weak Polish units withdrew to the main lines of the defence in front of Węgierska Górka. The Germans arrived there early in the morning of the following day.

The German infantry tried to storm the Polish positions on the run, but were bloodily repelled. The German commander then called for artillery and aerial bombardment of the Polish lines and repeated the assaults, which however were all repelled by the infantry battalion manning the field fortifications around the bunkers. By the end of the day the Poles claimed eight enemy armoured vehicles and tanks, while the Germans were forced back to their initial positions between Milówka and Węgierska Górka. However, other German units in the area were more successful and Janusz Gaładyk, the commander of the Polish 1st Mountain Brigade, ordered all Polish units in the area to withdraw overnight to the area of Oczków, where they were to shield the flank of the Polish 21st Infantry Division. However, as the battle continued throughout the night, the orders reached only the "Waligóra" bunker, artillery units and parts of the "Berezwecz" battalion, while the crews of the remaining three bunkers and the infantry units shielding them remained on their positions.

The heavy fighting for the area continued until the early morning. "Waligóra" was manned by seven soldiers from a routed unit and continued to fire at the Germans after the original crew withdrew. However, they were armed with their personal rifles only and had no ammunition left, which forced them to capitulate soon afterwards. All of them were subsequently executed by the Germans. With the Polish infantry and artillery units withdrawn, by dawn the Germans finally managed to outflank the Polish positions and partially encircle them. The crews however decided to continue the struggle until their ammunitions ran out. After a night-long heavy fight, the crew of the "Włóczęga" fired their last ammunition at half past 8 o'clock in the morning and capitulated. This sealed the fate of the nearby "Wędrowiec", as its sides were now open to enemy fire. The German infantry were now able to approach it and throw grenades through the unsealed MG turret shaft. Although no Polish soldiers were wounded, this allowed the Germans to tow anti-tank guns right outside the sealed bunker and fire directly into the MG and artillery nests. The crew withdrew to the safe part of the bunker and continued the fight with rifles, but the bunker's HMG and the 37 mm anti-tank gun were destroyed. Finally, at 5 o'clock in the evening "Wędrowiec" also capitulated. This allowed the Germans to gain free passage towards Kraków and the rear of the withdrawing Kraków Army. The crew of the "Wąwóz" continued the fight, but the German commander decided to avoid further losses and bypassed it. Realizing this, the crew withdrew overnight and joined other Polish units still in the area.

== Eyewitness account ==
From Lemberg to Bordeaux ('Von Lemberg bis Bordeaux'), written by Leo Leixner, a journalist and war correspondent, is a first-hand account of the battles that led to the fall of Poland, the low countries, and France. It includes a rare eye-witness description of the Battle of Węgierska Górka. In August 1939, Leixner joined the Wehrmacht as a war reporter, was promoted to sergeant, and in 1941 published his recollections. The book was originally issued by Franz Eher Nachfolger, the central publishing house of the Nazi Party.

== See also ==
- List of World War II military equipment of Poland
- List of German military equipment of World War II

== Notes and references ==
In-line:

General:

- Dariusz Krzyształowski (2006). "Węgierska Górka" (in Polish). Archived from the original on 5 August 2006.
- "Fort Węgierska Górka". 1939.pl (in Polish). 2005. Archived from the original on 2006-02-12.
- Stanley S.Seidner, Marshal Edward Śmigły-Rydz Rydz and the Defense of Poland, New York, 1978.
