= Bielsko Operational Group =

Polish Operation Group

Operational Group Bielsko (Grupa Operacyjna Bielsko, GO Bielsko), named after southern Polish city of Bielsko-Biała, was an Operational Group of the Polish Army which fought in the 1939 Invasion of Poland. Officially created on 23 March 1939, it belonged to Kraków Army, concentrated in southwestern corner of the Second Polish Republic. In the night of 2/3 September 1939, it was renamed into Operational Group Boruta, after General Mieczysław Boruta-Spiechowicz.

== Order of Battle in September 1939 ==
- Commandant: General Boruta-Spiechowicz,
- Artillery Commandant: Colonel Ludwik Buczek,
- Staff officer: Major Stanisław Panek,
- Chief of Staff: Colonel Władysław Krawczyk

=== Sixth Infantry Division ===
- Commandant: General Bernard Mond,
- Infantry Commandant: Colonel Ignacy Misiąg,

=== 21st Mountain Infantry Division ===
- Commandant: General Józef Kustroń,

=== 45th Reserve Infantry Division ===
- Commandant: General Henryk Krok-Paszkowski.

=== Other Units ===
- First Mountain Brigade,
- reserve units: 3rd Battalion of the 12th Infantry Regiment, 51st Independent Light Tank Company, garrison of Oświęcim, 4 fighter aircraft of Colonel W. Krol.

== See also ==
- Polish army order of battle in 1939
