= Bernard Mond =

Polish general (1887–1957)

Bernard Stanisław Mond
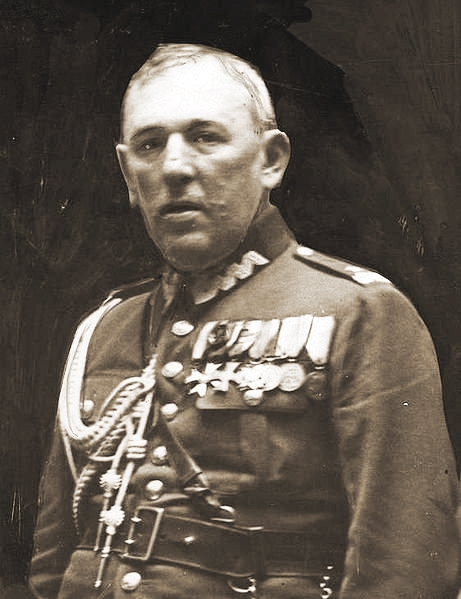
- Born: November 14, 1887; Stanisławów, Austro-Hungarian Monarchy
- Died: July 5, 1957 (aged 69); Kraków, Poland
- Burial place: Rakowicki Cemetery
- Military career
- Service years: 1918–1939
- Rank: Generał brygady (Brigadier general)
- Unit: 6th Infantry Division (Poland)
- Conflicts: World War I Polish–Ukrainian War; Polish–Soviet War; Invasion of Poland
- Awards
- Other work: Orbis manager

Bernard Stanisław Mond (Spanier) (November 14, 1887 in Stanisławów – July 5, 1957 in Kraków) was a Polish general of Jewish descent in the interwar period. He fought in the First World War, Polish–Ukrainian War, Polish–Soviet War and Second World War.

He was the highest ranking Polish-Jewish officer in the Polish Army.

== Early life ==
He was the son of Salomea and Maurycy Spanier, a railway official. His family was Polish-Jewish; he has been assimilated into the Polish society and Catholic. In 1907, Bernard graduated from the gymnasium in Brody, having joined a youth organization which agitated for Polish independence. Between 1907 and 1908 he served in the Austro-Hungarian Army. He began studies in the Department of Law at the University of Lviv in 1908, but two years later, he interrupted them to finish an administrative course at the District Railway Authority of Lwów and worked for this department until 1913. Afterwards, he resumed his study of law.

== World War I and interwar period ==
At the beginning of World War I, he was called up into the Austro-Hungarian Army where he served as a company commander. He was taken prisoner by the Russians in 1916 and sent to a POW camp. In November 1918, he commanded the "Citadel" section in the defence of Lwów during the Polish–Ukrainian War. He was wounded near Kiev on June 6, 1920, during the Polish-Soviet War. From May to October 1921 he was the commander of the town of Wilno. On December 21, 1932, or in 1933 he was made a brigadier general by the Polish president Ignacy Mościcki, and between 1932 and 1938 he commanded the Polish 6th Infantry Division of the Kraków Army. In 1935, after the death of the Polish leader Józef Piłsudski, Mond was the one who made the funeral arrangements for his former commander.

== World War II ==
In September 1939, Mond and his division defended the Pszczyna corridor against the German invasion. Surrounded by the Wehrmacht, he capitulated on September 20 at 3 p.m., near Nowe Sioło; and was subsequently imprisoned in German oflags: VII-A Murnau, IV-B Königstein and VI-B Dössel.

== After the war ==
He returned to Poland in 1946 and took a managerial position in a state travel agency Orbis. In 1950, persecuted by the communist government for his military service in the Second Polish Republic, he was dismissed and had to work as a handyman in a building materials warehouse in Poland. His funeral, however, was awarded full military honors.

== Family ==
Some members of his family, including his wife and sister, perished in The Holocaust, executed in the Tarnów Ghetto on December 1, 1943. They were hiding outside the ghetto, but had been arrested by the Germans; the exact circumstances are not known. Polish resistance executed an individual collaborating with the Germans who was suspected of denouncing Mond's family to the German authorities. Two German Gestapo soldiers who executed his family have been identified; one was killed during the war; the other was never found. Mond's two sons joined the Home Army resistance, took part in the Warsaw Uprising and survived the war.

== Promotions ==
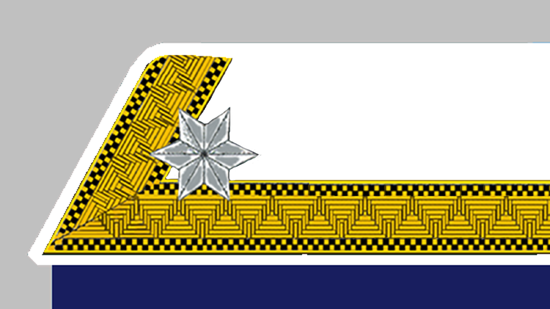
- Fähnrich - 1910
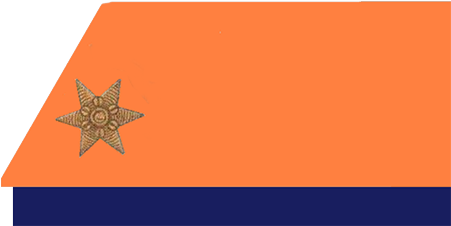
- Leutnant (Second lieutenant) - 1914
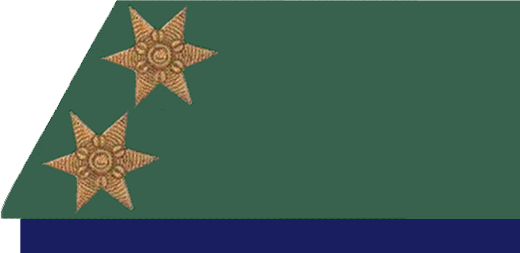
- Oberleutnant (First lieutenant) - 1916
- Kapitan (Captain) - 1918
- Major (Major) - 1920
- Podpułkownik (Lieutenant colonel) - 1922
- Pułkownik (Colonel) - 1 December 1924
- Generał brygady (Brigadier general) - 21 December 1932

== Awards and decorations ==
- Silver Cross of Virtuti Militari (20 May 1921)
- Cross of Independence with Swords (9 November 1933)
- Officer's Cross of the Order of Polonia Restituta (27 November 1929)
- Cross of Valour (four times)
- Gold Cross of Merit (10 November 1928)
- Commemorative Medal for the War of 1918–1921
- Medal of the 10th Anniversary of Regained Independence
- Commander of the Order of the Crown of Romania (Romania)
- Order of the White Cross of the Defense Union (Estonia)
- Medal of the 10th Anniversary of the War of Independence (Latvija)
- 1908 Jubilee Cross (Austria-Hungary)
- Military Merit Medal (Austria-Hungary)
- Karl Troop Cross (Austria-Hungary)
