= Stróża, Myślenice County =

Stróża
- Village
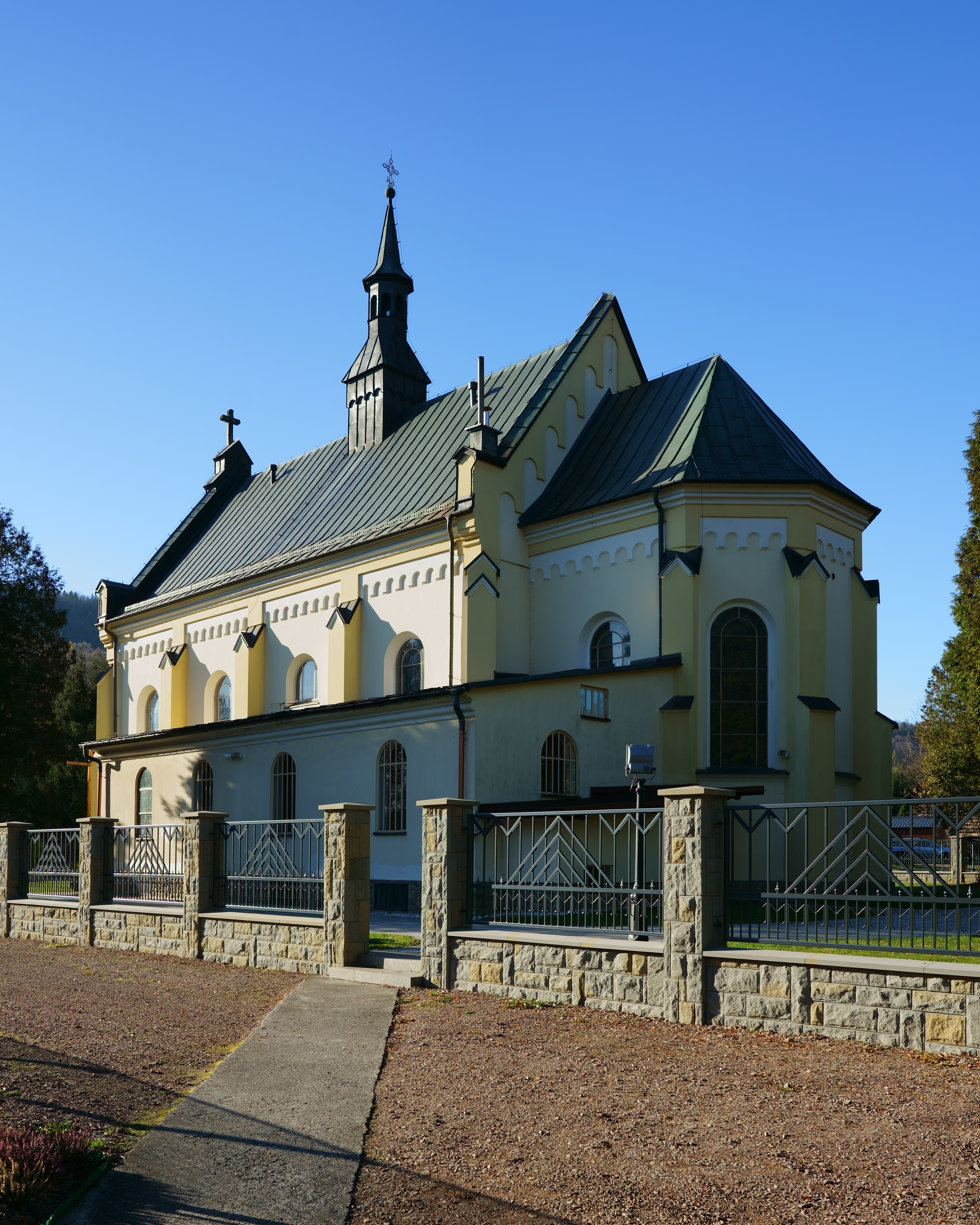
- Church of Our Lady Queen of Poland

- Location within Poland
- Coordinates: 49°47′37″N 19°54′35″E
- Country: Poland
- Voivodeship: Lesser Poland
- County: Myślenice
- Gmina: Pcim

Population
  - Total: 2,900

Stróża [ˈstruʐa] is a village in the administrative district of Gmina Pcim, within Myślenice County, Lesser Poland Voivodeship, in southern Poland.
