= Jan Jagmin-Sadowski =

Polish general

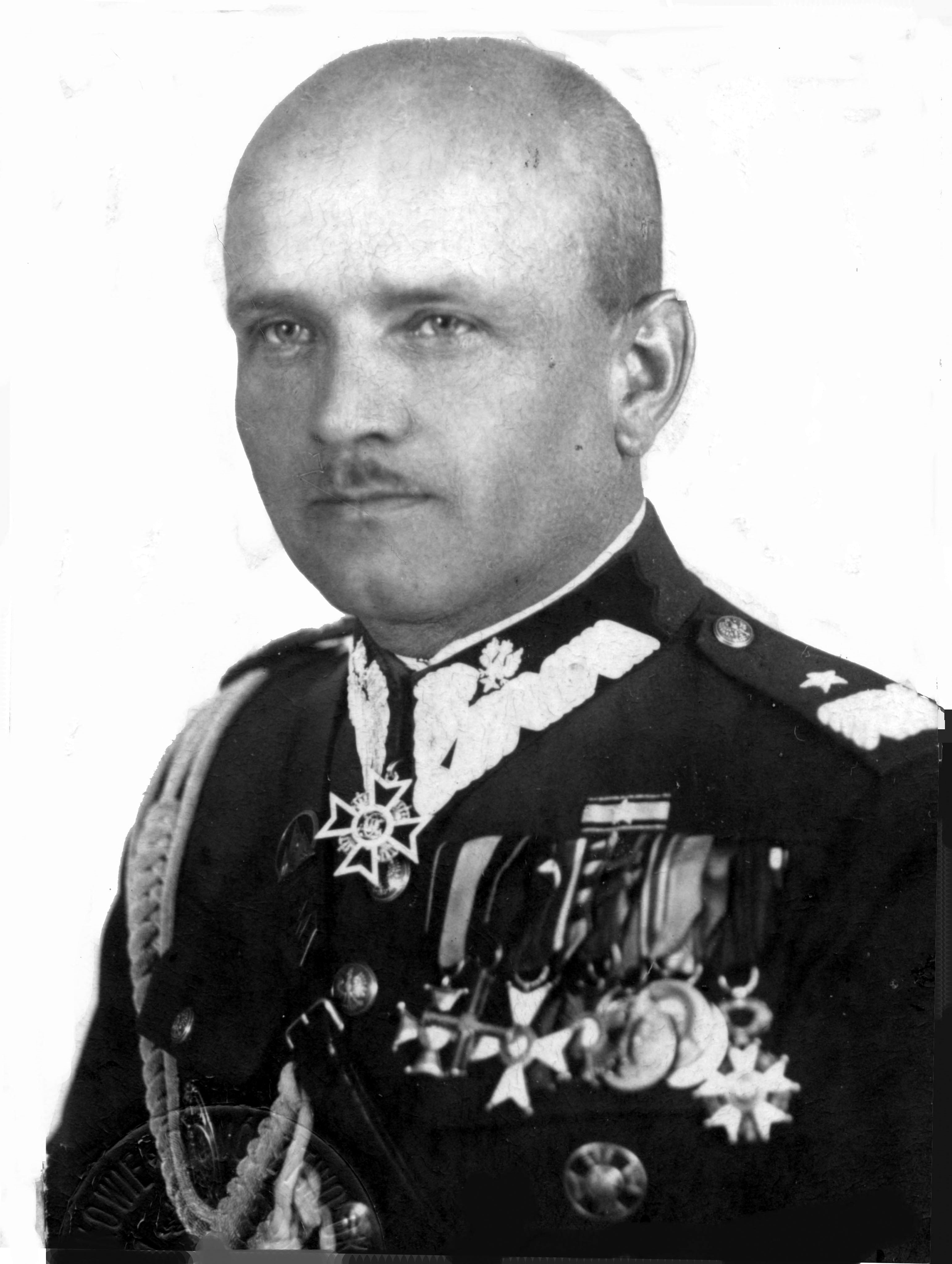
- Born: 24 April 1895; Grójec
- Died: 5 October 1977 (aged 82); Warsaw, Poland
- Military career
- Allegiance: Poland
- Rank: Generał (dywizji)
- Unit: I Brigade of the Polish Legions
- Commands: Polish 23rd Infantry Division; Śląsk Operational Group
- Conflicts: World War I World War II: Invasion of Poland; Battle of Tomaszów Lubelski
- Awards: Order Wojenny Virtuti Militari
- Other work: writer

Jan Jagmin-Sadowski (24 April 1895 – 5 October 1977), was a general of the Polish Army, having served in World War I as a member of Józef Piłsudski's legions, as well as commanding Polish forces during the invasion of Poland in 1939.

== Early life ==
In the early 20th century, Sadowski studied mechanics at the Lviv Polytechnic, and there he got in touch with Polish independence movement. He became a member of the Polish Socialist Party - Revolutionary Fraction, as well as the Polish Rifles and the Sokół movement.

== Military career ==
After the outbreak of World War I, he joined the 1st Legionnaire Rifles Regiment as a volunteer. In 1914, he distinguished himself in battles at Anielin and Łaski, and the next year he fought at Łowiczowek, Konary and Jozefowek. In 1916, as a soldier of the I Brigade of the Polish Legions, he fought in the bloody battle of Kostiuchnówka. After the Oath crisis, Sadowski, together with many other officers, was interned in a prisoner of war camp in Beniaminów.

In the Second Polish Republic, Sadowski, then a major, was an instructor at the School of Infantry Officers in Warsaw. In 1919 he entered the Polish Army Headquarters' School in Warsaw, then was sent on a two-year course to Ecole Superieure de Guerre in Paris. After graduation, Sadowski was promoted to colonel and became commandant of the elite 15. "Wolves" Infantry Regiment in Dęblin. Later on, in 1931, he was named commandant of the Polish 23rd Infantry Division, stationed in Katowice.

On 19 March 1939 Sadowski was promoted to general, and took command of the freshly created Fortified Area of Silesia. During the opening phase of the Second World War, the Invasion of Poland, he was commandant of the Operational Group Silesia, which was part of the Kraków Army. His units were engaged in heavy fights with the advancing Wehrmacht, especially in the area of Mikołów and Wyry. However, the Germans managed to break through the Polish defences and Sadowski ordered his men to retreat behind the Przemsza. In mid-September 1939 Edward Rydz-Śmigły reformed the Śląsk Operational Group into Operational Group Jagmin. Sadowski's troops participated in the defence of Kraków, then fought in the area of Kielce and finally, in the Battle of Tomaszów Lubelski, where they were defeated.

Surrendering to the Germans, Sadowski was kept in a POW camp for the duration of the war. In 1946 he returned to Poland, where he was forced to move to the army reserve.

== Later life ==
In 1976 his name once again became famous, when Sadowski, protesting against conferring Virtuti Militari to Leonid Brezhnev, together with other war weterans, left his own Virtuti Militari at the Jasna Góra Monastery. He wrote several books, including Dzialania Grupy Operacyjnej "Śląsk" 1-3 września 1939 r. (Activities of the Śląsk Operational Group, 1–3 September 1939).
