= Gmina Pcim =

Gmina Pcim Pcim Commune
- Gmina
- Coat of arms
- Interactive map of Gmina Pcim
- Coordinates (Pcim): 49°45′N 19°58′E
- Country: Poland
- Voivodeship: Lesser Poland
- County: Myślenice
- Seat: Pcim

Area
  - Total: 88.59 km^{2} (34.20 sq mi)

Population (2006)
  - Total: 10,327
  - Density: 116.6/km^{2} (301.9/sq mi)
- Website: https://www.pcim.pl

Gmina Pcim is a rural gmina (administrative district) in Myślenice County, Lesser Poland Voivodeship, in southern Poland. Its seat is the village of Pcim, which lies approximately 10 kilometres (6 mi) south of Myślenice and 35 km (22 mi) south of the regional capital Kraków.

The gmina covers an area of 88.59 square kilometres (34.2 sq mi), and as of 2006 its total population is 10,327.

== Villages ==
The gmina contains the villages of Pcim, Stróża and Trzebunia.

== Neighbouring gminas ==
Gmina Pcim is bordered by the gminas of Budzów, Lubień, Mszana Dolna, Myślenice, Sułkowice, Tokarnia and Wiśniowa.
