= Agency for Restructuring and Modernisation of Agriculture =

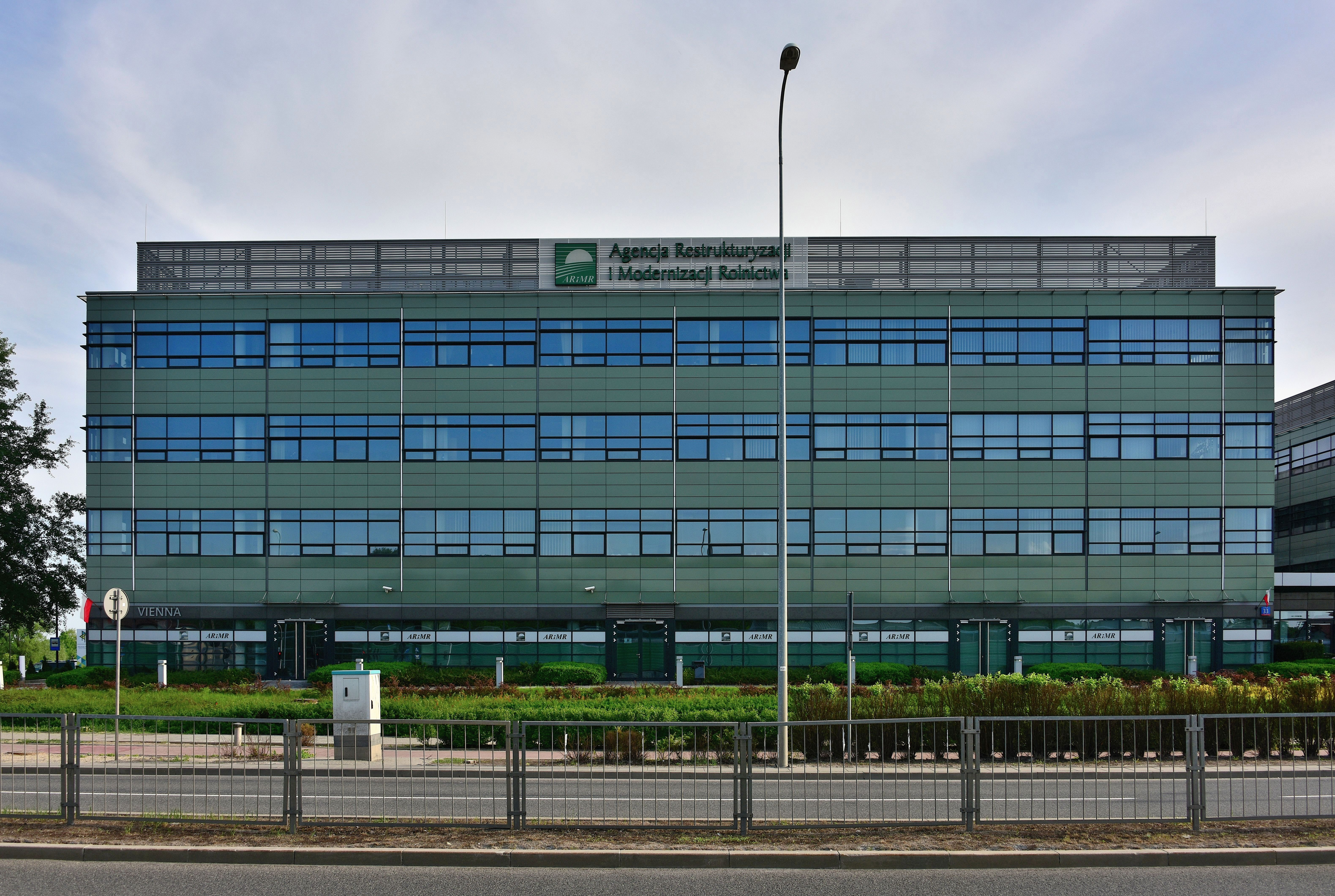

Agency overview
- Formed: 29 December 1993; 32 years ago
- Headquarters: Warsaw, Poland
- Agency executives: Wojciech Legawiec, President; Joanna Gierulska, Deputy President; Aneta Burghardt, Deputy President; Leszek Szymański, Deputy President; Marek Budzich, Acting Deputy President; Tomasz Nawrocki, Deputy President
- Website: Official website

The Agency for Restructuring and Modernisation of Agriculture (ARMA) (Polish: Agencja Restrukturyzacji i Modernizacji Rolnictwa (ARiMR)) is a state legal entity established by the Act of December 29, 1993, on the establishment of the Agency for Restructuring and Modernization of Agriculture to support the development of agriculture and rural areas. Currently, it operates based on the Act of May 9, 2008, on the Agency for Restructuring and Modernization of Agriculture.

ARMA has been designated by the government to serve as an accredited paying agency. It implements instruments co-financed from the European Union budget and provides assistance from national funds. As an executor of agricultural policy, the agency closely cooperates with the Ministry of Agriculture and Rural Development. ARMA is also subject to supervision by the Ministry of Finance in terms of managing public funds. Based on the Act of February 10, 2017, on the National Support Center for Agriculture and the Act on the Introduction of Regulations on the National Support Center for Agriculture, the agency has been the sole EU paying agency in the territory of the Republic of Poland since September 1, 2017.

== Organisational structure ==
The President appointed by the Prime Minister of the Republic of Poland upon the recommendation of the Minister of Agriculture and Rural Development, as well as the Minister of Finance, heads the Agency for Restructuring and Modernisation of Agriculture. ARMA's structure is three-tiered – it consists of the Headquarters, 16 Regional Branches (one branch per province), and 314 County Offices.

=== Management ===
- Wojciech Legawiec – President since January 10, 2024
- Joanna Gierulska – Deputy President since November 15, 2022
- Aneta Burghardt – Deputy President since October 10, 2023 (acting since June 6, 2023)
- Leszek Szymański – Deputy President since January 15, 2024
- Marek Budzich – Acting Deputy President since February 6, 2024
- Tomasz Nawrocki – Deputy President since February 6, 2024
