= Pcim =

- Village
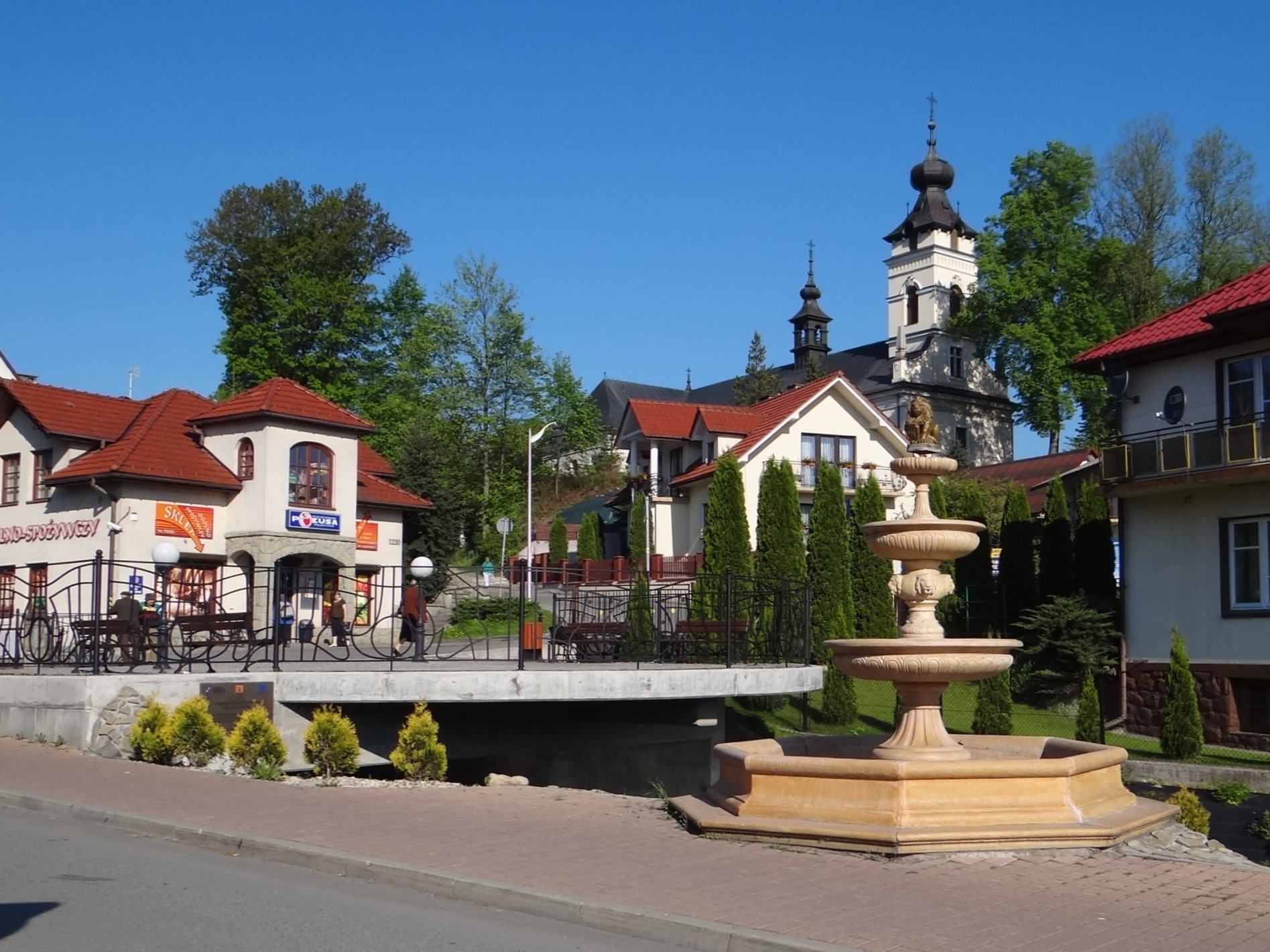
- Center of the village

- Location within Poland
- Coordinates: 49°45′N 19°58′E
- Country: Poland
- Voivodeship: Lesser Poland
- County: Myślenice
- Gmina: Pcim
- Population: 4,900

Pcim [pt͡ɕim] is a village in Myślenice County, Lesser Poland Voivodeship, in southern Poland. It is located in the gmina (administrative district) of Gmina Pcim, of which it is the seat. The village, which is located along the European route E77, is divided into three districts: Pcim Centrum, Pcim Krzywica, and Pcim Sucha. The name Pcim is sometimes used in Polish in fictional contexts as a slightly comic-sounding town or village name.

== History ==
First settlers came here in the early 13th century, invited by Prince of Kraków Leszek I the White. In 1338, King Casimir III the Great founded here parish church of St. Nicholas. At that time, the village belonged to a Czech knight named Nedan, hence its name Nedanowa Wola. According to a 1629 document, Pcim had two mills. In the Polish September Campaign, soldiers of the 10th Motorized Cavalry Brigade fought here defensive battles with the advancing Wehrmacht. During the war, Pcim was an important center of the Home Army. The village was flooded in the 2010 Central European floods.
