= Mieczysław Boruta-Spiechowicz =

Polish general (1894–1985)

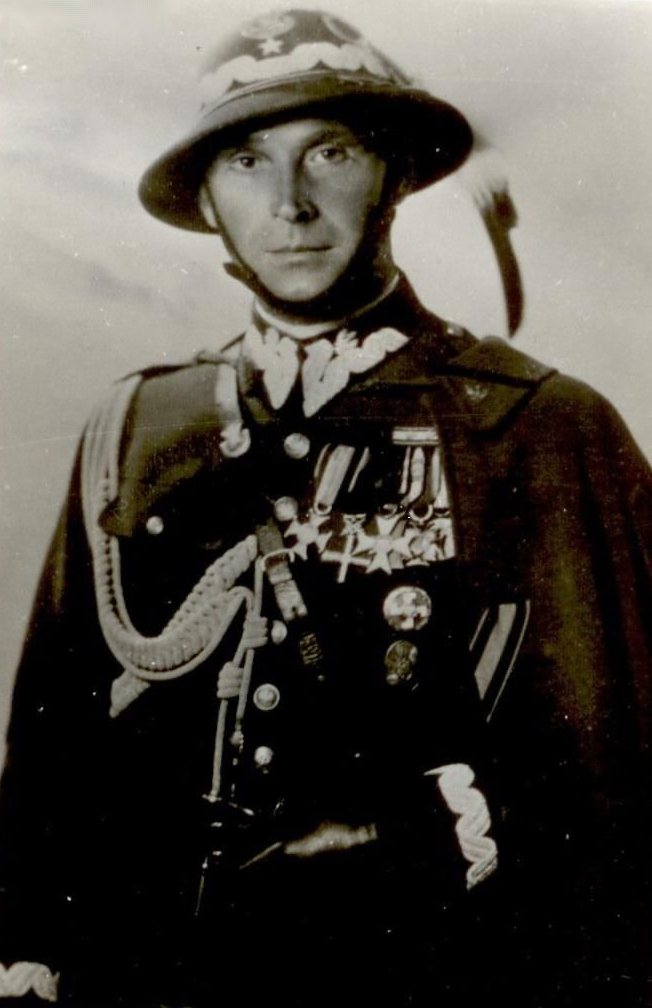
- Photograph of Mieczysław Ludwik Boruta-Spiechowicz, before 1939
- Nicknames: Kopa, Morawski
- Born: 20 February 1894; Rzeszów, Austria-Hungary
- Died: 13 October 1985 (aged 91) Zakopane, Poland
- Service years: 1914-1946
- Rank: 'Generał brygady' (Brigadier general)
- Commands: CO of Boruta Operational Group; CO of the 1st Armoured Corps
- Conflicts: Great War; Polish-Ukrainian War; Polish-Bolshevik War; Invasion of Poland; World War II
- Awards: Order Virtuti Militari (V klasy) Krzyż Oficerski Orderu Odrodzenia Polski Krzyż Niepodległości z Mieczami Krzyż Walecznych Złoty Krzyż Zasługi
- Other work: farmer, social worker

Mieczysław Ludwik Boruta-Spiechowicz (20 February 1894, in Rzeszów – 13 October 1985, in Zakopane) was a Polish military officer, a general of the Polish Army and a notable member of the post-war anti-communist opposition in Poland.

He joined the army in 1914 and served at various posts within the Polish Legions. After Poland regained her independence in 1918 he remained in active service and took part in both the Polish-Ukrainian War and the Battle of Lwów, in which he commanded a separate defence line, and later a Lwów Infantry Regiment formed out of local volunteers. Dispatched to France, he became the commander of two regiments of the Blue Army, with which he returned to Poland in 1919. During the Polish-Bolshevik War he distinguished himself as a skilled commander of the Polish mountain infantry units, of which he formed a regiment and commanded it on various fronts of the conflict.

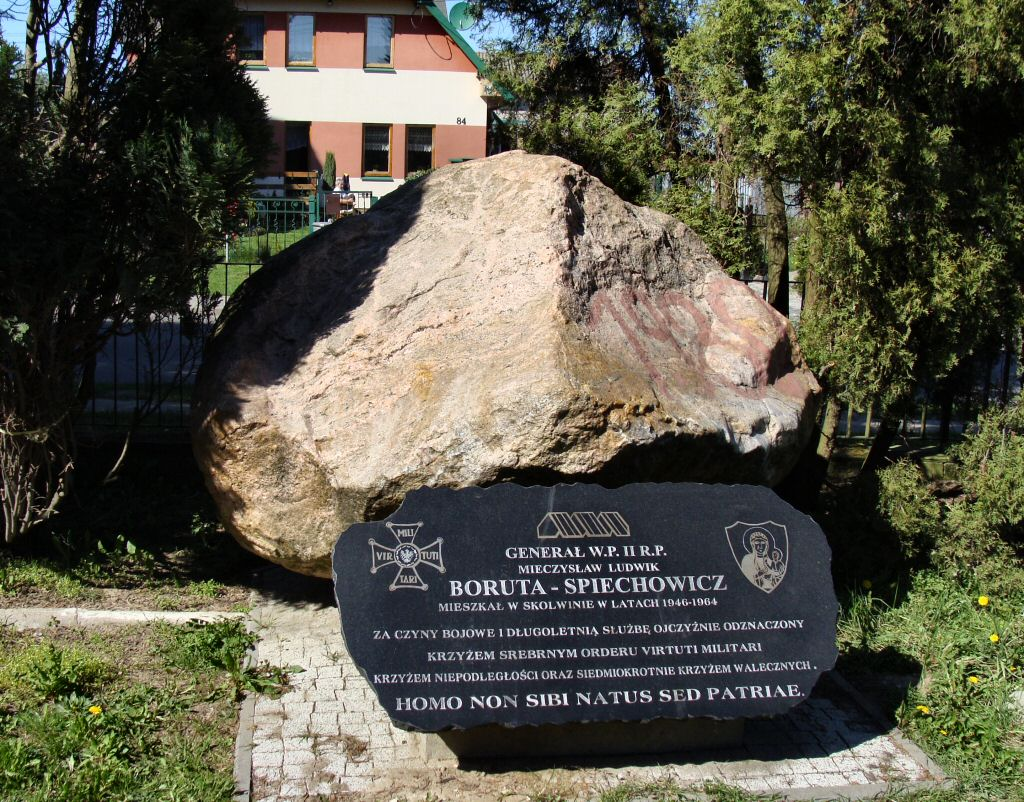
Monument of Mieczysław Boruta-Spiechowicz in Szczecin-Skolwin

After the war he was sent to the Higher War School in Warsaw and received professional military training. He served at various commanding posts in a number of Polish infantry units, both standard and mountain. He was also a notable military theorist and writer of several books on the history and practice of warfare. During the Invasion of Poland he served as the commanding officer of the Boruta Operational Group, a part of the Kraków Army. Taken prisoner by the USSR, he was held in various Gulags and NKVD prisons until set free by the Sikorski-Mayski Agreement of 1941. He then joined the Anders' Polish Army in the East and became the commanding officer of the newly formed Polish 5th Infantry Division. He spent the rest of World War II as the commander of the Polish 1st Armoured Corps, combining the Polish 1st Armoured Division and the Polish Independent Parachute Brigade.

As one of the very few Polish pre-war generals to return to Communist-held Poland in 1945, he was initially accepted into the Polish People's Army. However, following a conflict with Karol Świerczewski he was demobilized and retired. He settled in Zakopane, where he became a farmer. He also remained an active member of the anti-communist opposition in Poland and in 1977 became one of the founding members of the ROPCiO movement.

== Honours and awards ==
- Silver Cross of the Order of Virtuti Militari
- Officer's Cross of the Order of Polonia Restituta
- Cross of Independence with Swords
- Cross of Valour (seven times)
- Gold Cross of Merit

== Bibliography ==
- Tadeusz Krawczak. Pro fide et patria: generał Mieczysław Boruta-Spiechowicz. Szczecin: "Pogranicze". 2004 ISBN 83-89341-15-8
- Wojciech Grobelski – Generał brygady Ludwik Mieczysław Boruta-Spiechowicz (1894–1985), Warszawa, 2010 ISBN 978-83-235-0793-2
- Zbigniew Mierzwiński: Generałowie II Rzeczypospolitej. Warszawa 1990: Wydawnictwo Polonia, s. 53–58. ISBN 83-7021-096-1.
- Tadeusz Jurga: Obrona Polski 1939. Warszawa: Instytut Wydawniczy PAX, 1990, s. 753–754. ISBN 83-211-1096-7.
