= Węgierska Górka =

Węgierska Górka Magyarhegy
- Village
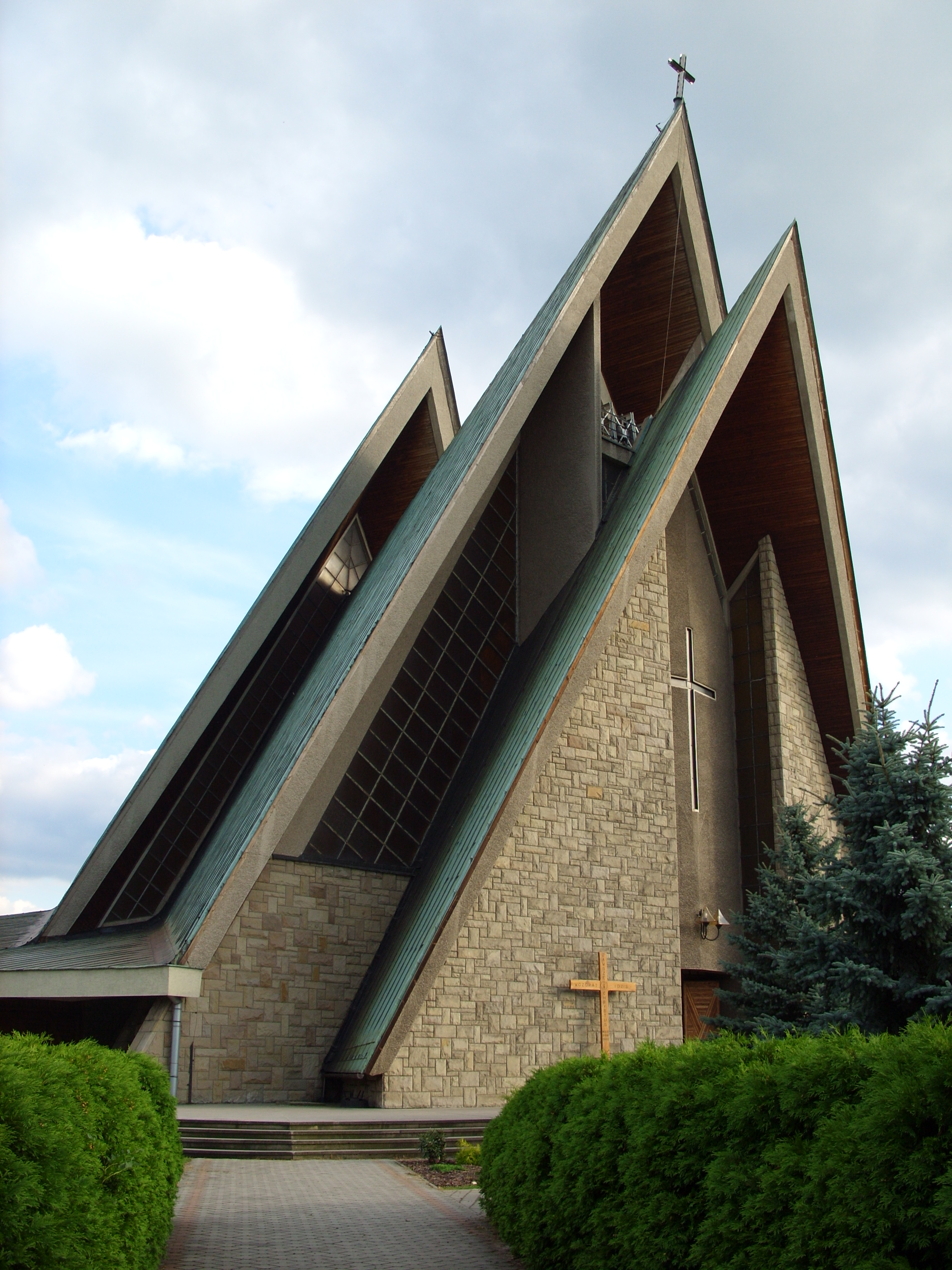
- Church of the Transfiguration of Jesus Christ

- Location within Poland
- Coordinates: 49°36′28″N 19°7′0″E
- Country: Poland
- Voivodeship: Silesian
- County: Żywiec
- Gmina: Węgierska Górka
- Population: 4,206
- Climate: Dfb

Węgierska Górka [vɛnˈɡʲɛrska ˈɡurka] (Literally Polish for "Hungarian Hill", Hungarian: Magyarhegy) is a village in Żywiec County, Silesian Voivodeship, in the historic province of Lesser Poland. It is the seat of the gmina (administrative district) called Gmina Węgierska Górka.

== Location ==
Węgierska Górka is located among the hills of the Żywiec Beskids, on the Soła river. For most of its existence, the village, together with Żywiec, was administratively and culturally tied with Kraków and Lesser Poland. Until 1975, it belonged to Kraków Voivodeship. In 1975 - 1999, it was part of Bielsko-Biała Voivodeship. Węgierska Górka is located on National Road Nr 69 from Bielsko-Biała to the border with Slovakia. It has a rail station, on a line from Katowice to Skalite.

== History ==
The village was first mentioned in documents in 1477, when Polish King Kazimierz Jagiellończyk argued with Hungarian King Matthias Corvinus over the shape of the border between the two nations. In 1706, Franciszek Wielopolski opened here a folwark, calling it Węgierska Górka. In 1838 Adam Wielopolski founded here ironworks, and two years later, a blast furnace was completed. At that time, Węgierska Górka belonged to the Austrian province of Galicia, which was the result of the Partitions of Poland. After a few years, the Węgierska Górka Ironworks became one of the largest such enterprises in Galicia. In 1884, Węgierska Górka received a rail connection with other locations, and the village quickly grew in size and population.

In the Second Polish Republic, Węgierska Górka became a popular winter sports center, and a mountain spa. In September 1939, the village was the site of the Battle of Węgierska Górka. Polish defensive fortifications, built before World War II, can still be found and visited here. In 1961 the population of the village was 2,215. A new school was opened on 23 July 1961, and in the late 1960s / early 1970s, a whole district of blocks of flats was built.
