= 2nd Podhale Rifles Regiment =

Polish infantry regiment

- 2 Pułk Strzelców Podhalańskich (Polish)
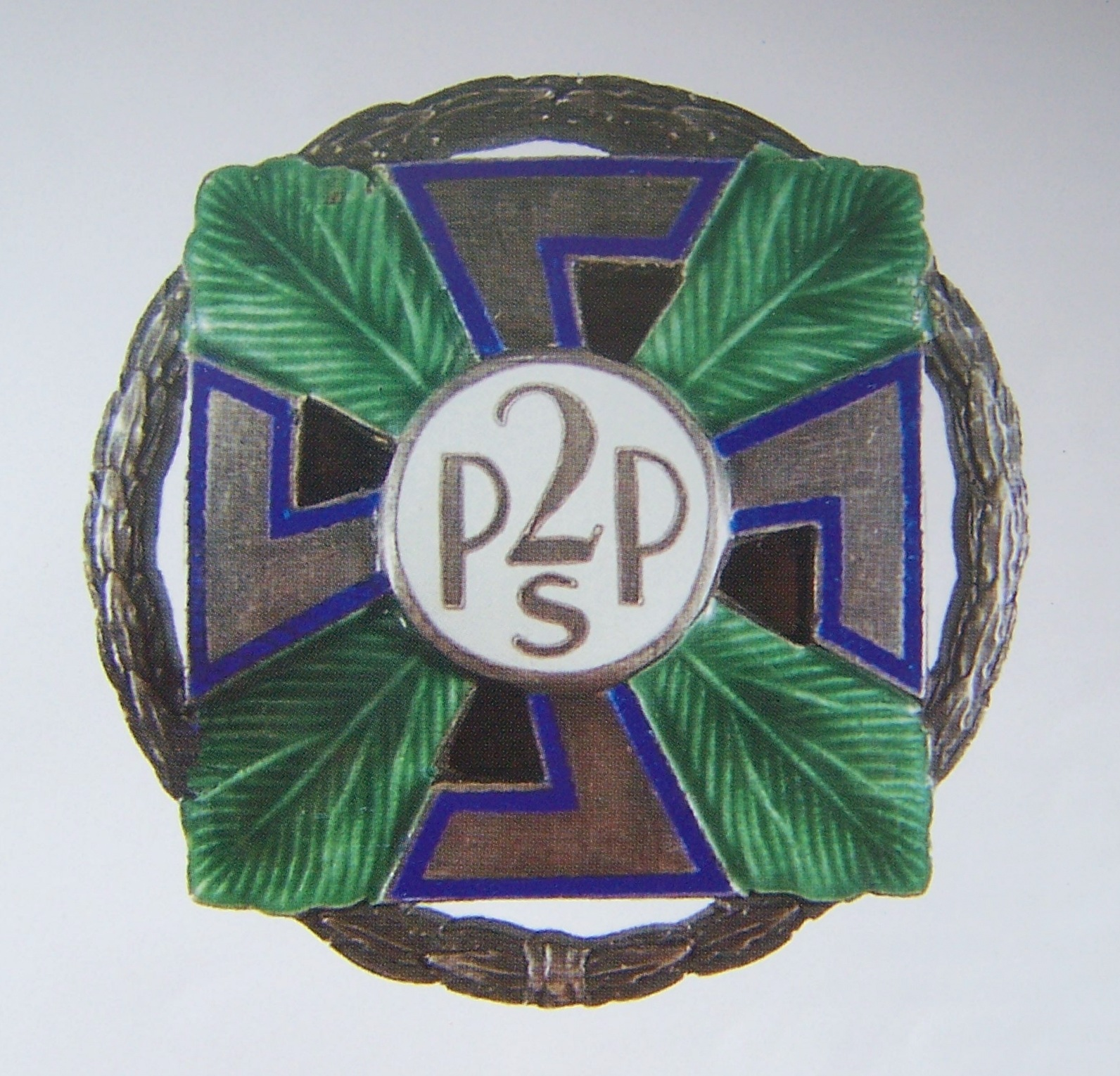
- Regimental badge, approved by Ministry of Military Affairs Order No. 32, Item 312, dated 16 October 1929
- Active: 31 October 1918–10 September 1939
- Country: Poland
- Branch: Army
- Type: Infantry
- Role: Mountain infantry
- Part of: Mountain Rifles Brigade; 1st Mountain Brigade; 2nd Mountain Division; 22nd Mountain Infantry Division
- Garrison/HQ: Sanok
- Anniversaries: 23 September
- Engagements: Polish–Soviet War; Battle of the Niemen River (20–26 September 1920); September Campaign

Commanders
- Notable commanders: General Jerzy Dobrodzicki (first); Colonel Stefan Szlaszewski (last)

The 2nd Podhale Rifles Regiment (Polish: 2 Pułk Strzelców Podhalańskich) was an infantry unit of the Polish Armed Forces, stationed in the garrison of Sanok, forming part of the 22nd Mountain Infantry Division.

== Formation and border conflicts ==
The regiment was established on 31 October 1918, based on the reserve battalion of the Austro-Hungarian 32nd Landwehr Infantry Regiment in Bochnia, under the command of Major Jerzy Dobrodzicki, later promoted to general. It was subsequently redesignated as the 2nd Podhale Rifles Regiment. It was the only regiment of the later Corps District X formed on Polish soil. On 9 December 1918, the 1st Battalion was formed, stationed in Sanok. The 2nd Battalion was established in mid-December in Bochnia, and the 3rd Battalion in spring 1919 in Nowy Targ. On 13 December 1918, the 1st Battalion, led by Lieutenant Karol Matzenauer, saw its first combat near the village of Krościenko on the Strviazh river, participating in battles near Zagórz and Chyrów, and later within the Bug Group in the areas of Rawa Ruska, Tarnopol, and Gajów Dytkowiecki. The 2nd Battalion, after defending the south-western border in Spiš, joined the Ukrainian front in mid-January 1919, fighting alongside the 1st Battalion in the Bug Group under General Henryk Minkiewicz. The 3rd Battalion was deployed to the Czech border. In July 1919, the regiment was sent to Pokuttia to guard the Romanian border. In spring 1920, the regiment united all its battalions and joined the 1st Mountain Brigade. In December 1919, the regiment's reserve battalion was stationed in Nowy Targ.

In March 1920, the regiment moved to the Bolshevik front at Dubno, later to Sławeczno, where the 3rd Battalion, previously guarding the Czech border, rejoined. The regiment participated in the Kyiv offensive, distinguishing itself in battles at Czapowice and Malin. During the retreat, it defended Brest on the Bug river. On 8 May 1920, as part of the 1st Mountain Brigade, the regiment entered Kyiv, securing its northern suburbs. In June 1920, during the Polish retreat, it defended the Dnieper river crossing until 12 June, engaging in skirmishes with Bolshevik forces. The regiment then served as the rearguard for the 3rd Army, earning distinction in the defense of Brest. Its soldiers participated in the Polish counteroffensive starting 16 August, capturing Kock, Łuków, Siedlce, Sokołów, Białystok, and Gródek. After a few days, it fought along the Sidra river. The regiment concluded its combat operations with a three-day battle at Kuźnica on 23 September 1920. On 4 October, it participated in capturing Grodno.

=== Recipients of the Virtuti Militari ===
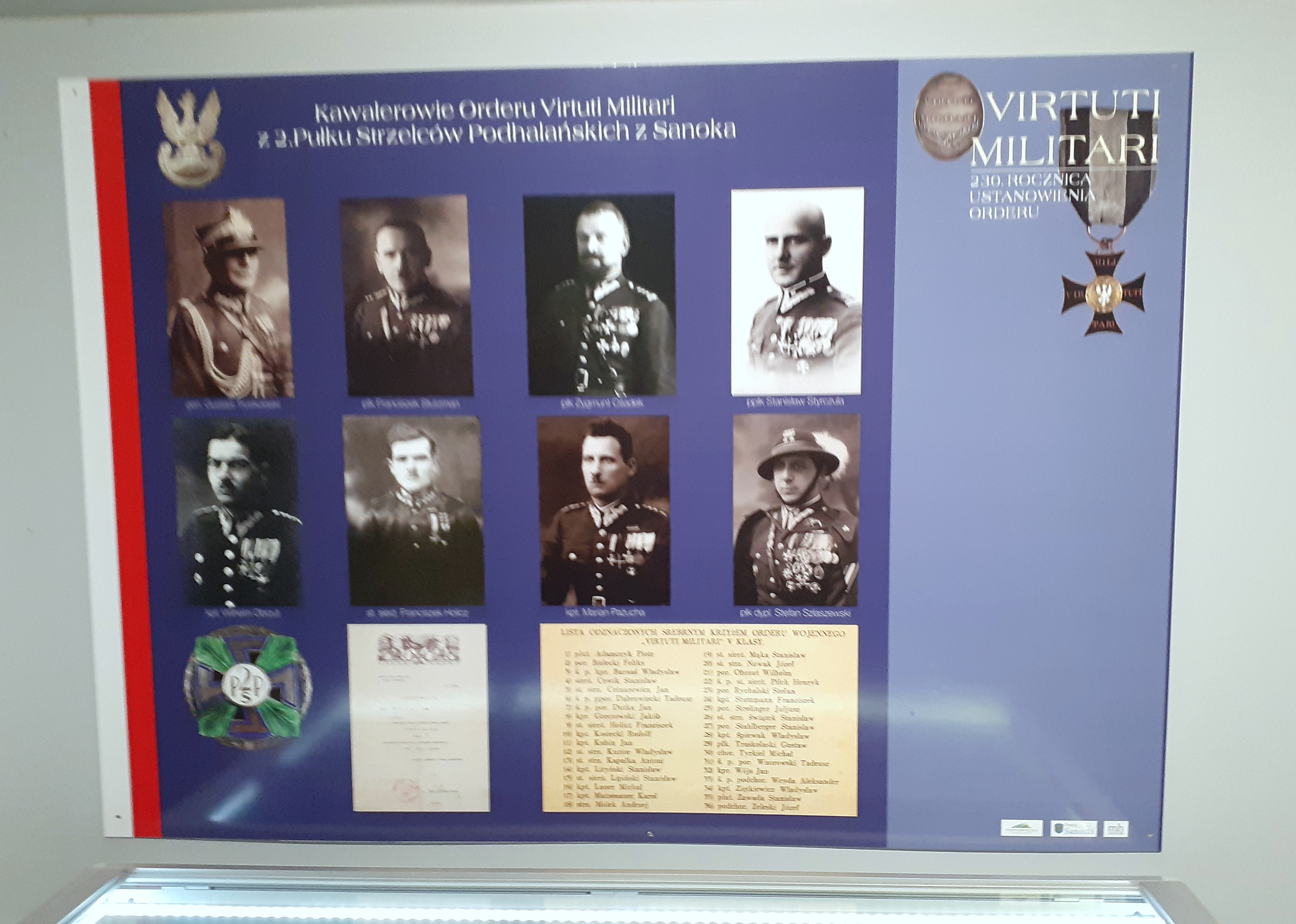
Virtuti Militari recipients from the 2nd Podhale Rifles Regiment at a 2022 exhibition

Soldiers of the regiment awarded the Silver Cross of the Military Order Virtuti Militari for the 1918–1920 war:

- Platoon Leader Piotr Adamczyk
- Deceased Corporal Władysław Barnaś
- Second Lieutenant Feliks Bielecki
- Sergeant Stanisław Cewik
- Senior Rifleman Jan Cetnarowicz
- Deceased Second Lieutenant Tadeusz Dąbrowiecki
- Deceased Lieutenant Jan Dutka
- Corporal Jakub Gorczowski
- Sergeant Franciszek Holicz
- Senior Rifleman Antoni Kapałka
- Captain Rudolf Kostecki
- Captain Jan Kubin
- Senior Rifleman Władysław Kuzior
- Sergeant Stanisław Lipiński
- Captain Stanisław Lityński
- Second Lieutenant Michał Lauer
- Captain Karol Matzenauer
- Senior Sergeant Stanisław Mąka
- Rifleman Andrzej Molek
- Senior Rifleman Józef Nowak
- Lieutenant Wilhelm Obrzut
- Senior Sergeant Henryk Pilch
- Lieutenant Stefan Rychalski
- Lieutenant Stanisław Stahlberger
- Lieutenant Juliusz Strelinger
- Captain Franciszek Stutzmann
- Captain Władysław Śpiewak
- Senior Rifleman Stanisław Świątek
- Colonel Gustaw Truskolaski
- Senior Sergeant Michał Tyrkiel
- Sergeant Aleksander Weyda
- Lieutenant Tadeusz Wnorowski
- Corporal Jan Wójs
- Platoon Leader Stanisław Zawada
- Captain Władysław Ziętkiewicz
- Second Lieutenant Józef Żeleski

== Peacetime activities ==
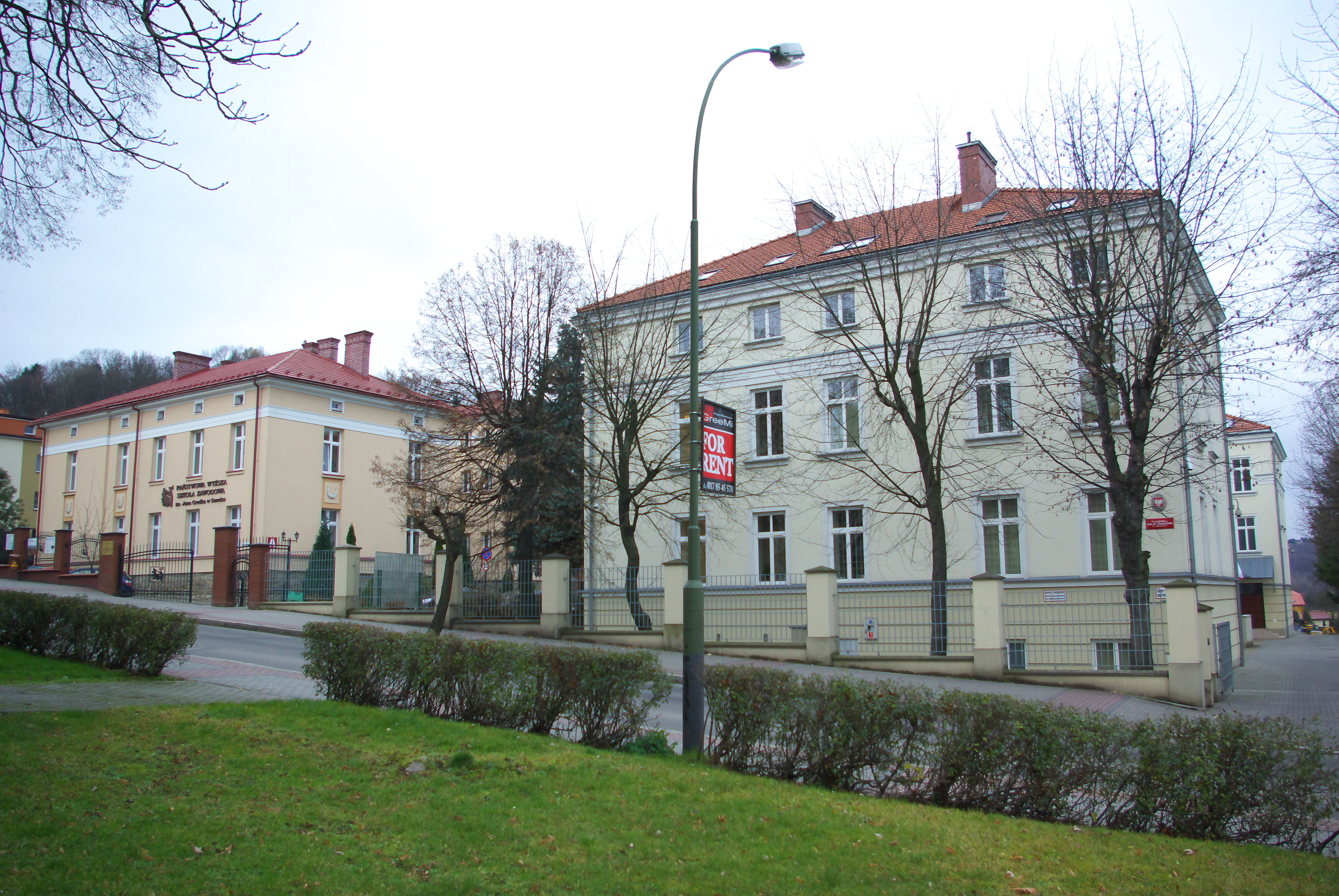
Former barracks at 21 and 23 Adam Mickiewicz Street

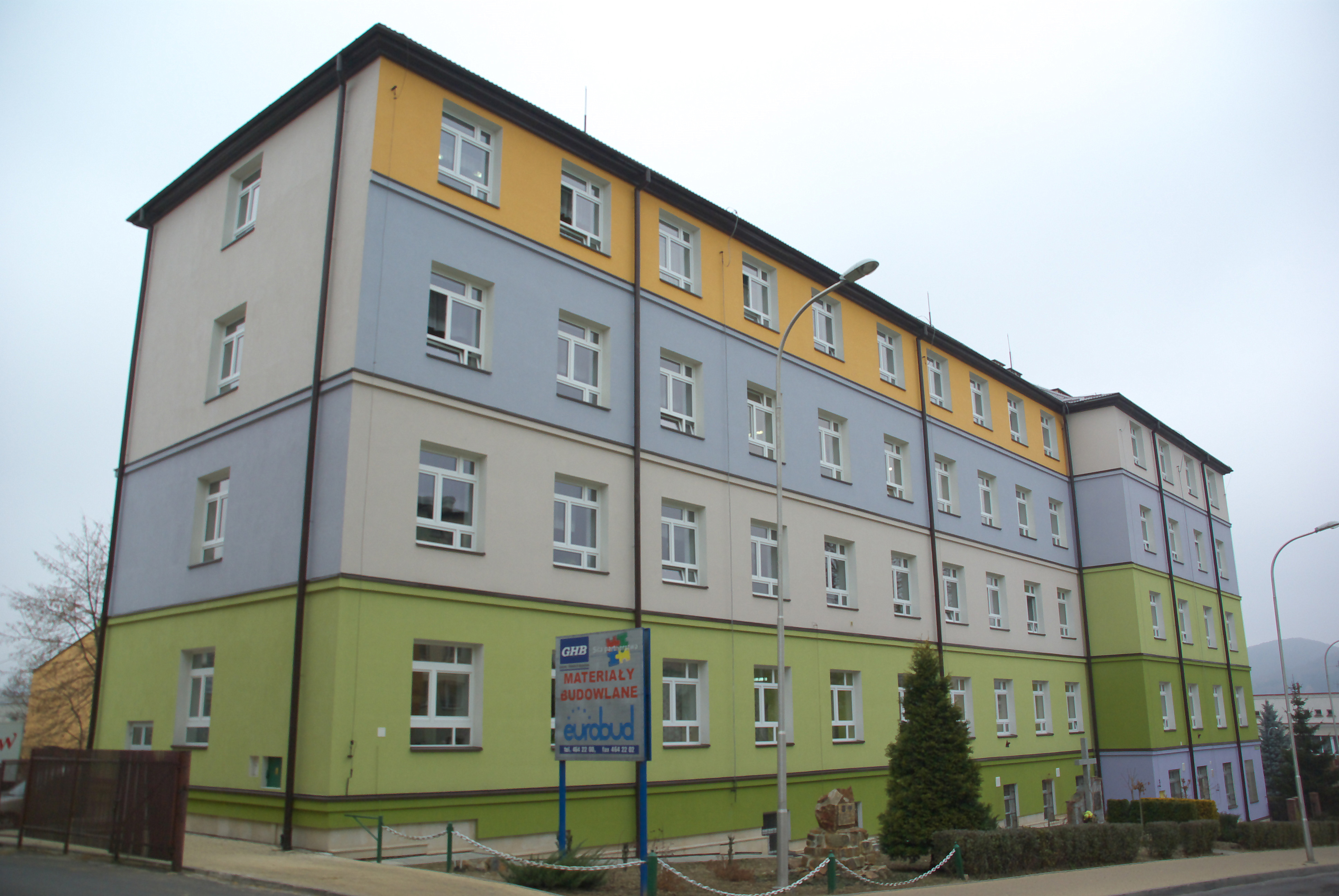
Former barracks at John III Sobieski Street

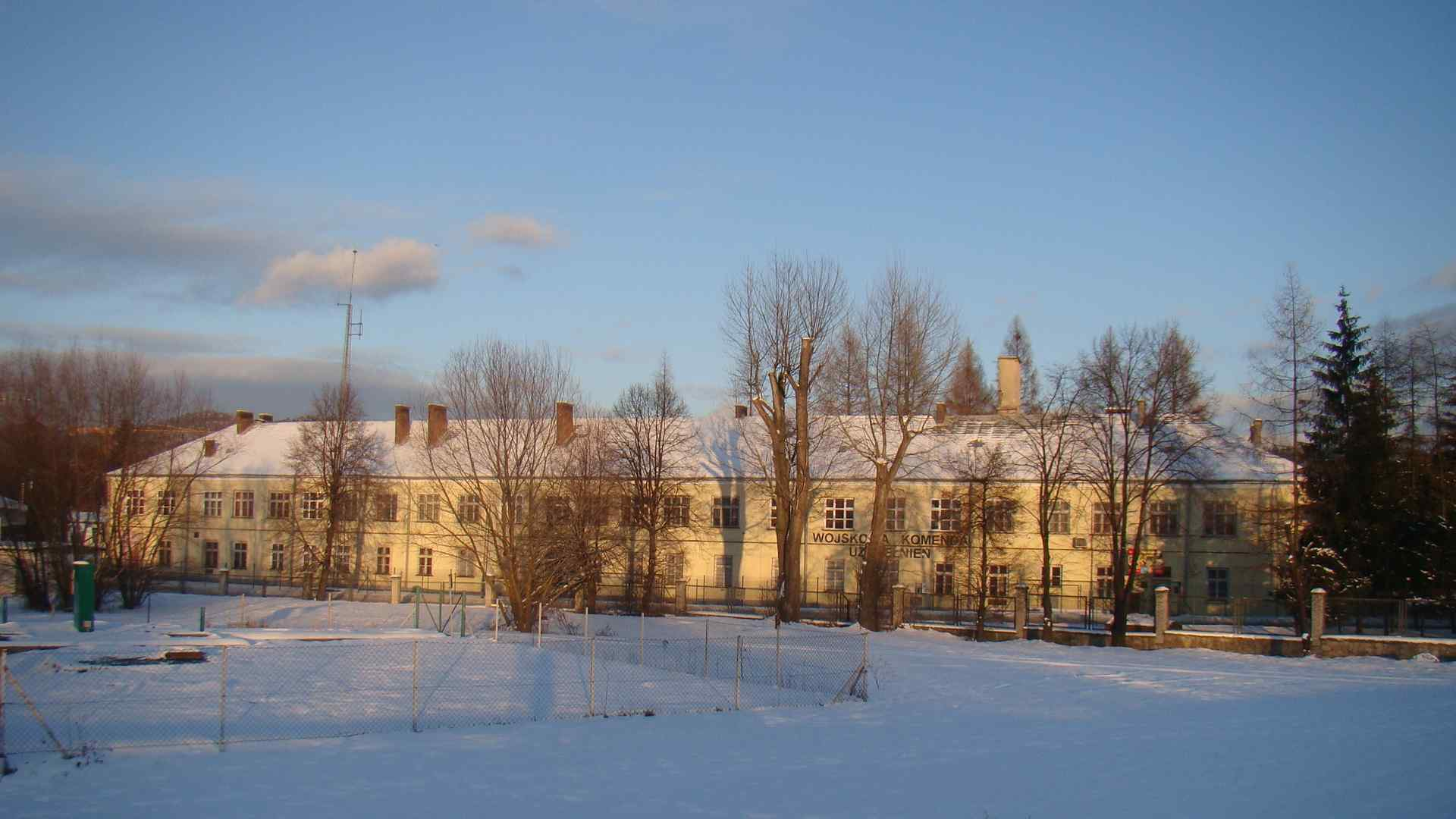
Former barracks in Olchowce

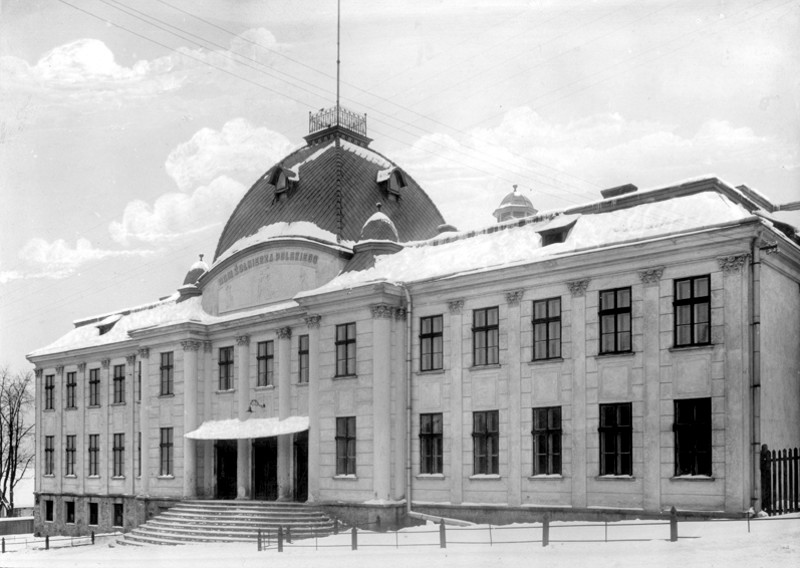
Polish Soldier's Home in Sanok

On 6 December 1920, the regiment arrived in Sanok, with an official reception held on 12 December. During the ceremony, local high school professor Urban Przyprawa and Lieutenant Colonel Edward Kańczucki delivered speeches. From the outset, efforts were made to integrate the military community with the city's residents. In 1922, the regiment had 87 officers: 3 colonels, 16 majors, 20 captains, 34 lieutenants, and 12 second lieutenants. By 1924, there were 58 regular and 14 supernumerary officers, and in 1928, 40 regular officers (2 colonels, 3 majors, 17 captains, 16 lieutenants, 2 second lieutenants) and 11 supernumerary. In 1932, there were 48 regular officers (1 colonel, 1 lieutenant colonel, 5 majors, 17 captains, 16 lieutenants, 8 second lieutenants).

In the early 1920s, the regiment's deployment was split: the headquarters, 1st and 2nd Battalions, and the reserve battalion cadre were stationed in Sanok, while the 3rd Battalion was in Dębica. Later, the entire regiment was consolidated in Sanok. The headquarters operated from the former barracks at 21 Adam Mickiewicz Street, with battalions stationed separately:

- 1st Battalion at the building on John III Sobieski Street,
- 2nd Battalion at the barracks at Adam Mickiewicz Street,
- 3rd Battalion and infantry artillery platoon at the barracks in Olchowce district.

The regiment actively participated in city life, contributing to the construction of the Polish Soldier's Home, a cultural hub for both the regiment and residents.

Based on the 1930 Ministry of Military Affairs order introducing peacetime infantry organization (PS 10-50), the regiment was classified as a Type I infantry regiment ("normal"). It received approximately 610 recruits annually, with a strength of 56 officers and 1,500 non-commissioned officers and privates. In winter, it comprised an older-year battalion, a training battalion, and a skeleton battalion; in summer, an older-year battalion and two conscript battalions. After the new organization, the regiment trained recruits for the Border Protection Corps.

The regiment maintained an officers' choir, conducted by Captain Marian Warmuzek. The regimental band, led in the 1920s by Lieutenant Maksymilian Firek, won first place in a national military bands competition. Later, Captain Kazimierz Wojakowski led the band to second place in a competition held by the 10th Corps District Command in Przemyśl in October 1928. In the 1930s, Lieutenant Stanisław Węgrzynowski was the bandmaster. The band performed at Adam Mickiewicz Park and regularly for spa guests in Iwonicz-Zdrój. During the Mountain Rally in Sanok from 14 to 17 August 1936, a competition and festival of Podhale Rifles regiments' bands was held.

From 1921, the regiment developed sports activities, and by 1924, it had a stadium with a 460-meter track, a grandstand, an obstacle course, a fencing area, a grenade-throwing range, and a games field. The regiment was represented in Sanok by the Podhalanin sports club. The Podhalanie football team included Major Andrzej Bogacz and Lieutenant Roman Folwarczny as forwards, with Folwarczny and Captain Marian Warmuzek initiating the construction of the Wierchy Stadium. The regiment also sponsored the 2nd Podhale Rifles Ski Association, which organized ski courses in Nowy Łupków, led by Captain Marian Suda, and the Military Sports Club, headed by Major Jan Stanisław Matuszek. Major Marian Franciszek Kowalski chaired the Sanoczanka Ski Section of the Sanok branch of the Polish Tatra Society. Every soldier was trained in skiing, with instructors including Lieutenant Roman Folwarczny, Senior Sergeant Biner, and Private Skupień from Zakopane, a member of the Polish national team.

On 6 March 1930, regiment soldiers participated in suppressing the Hunger March demonstration. In 1931, due to the regiment's presence, the Christ the King parish was established in Sanok, with chaplains Father Bronisław Nowyk and Father Roman Kostikow.

Between 21 June and 9 July 1932, two regimental companies helped restore order in several Lesko communes during the Lesko uprising. In 1936, the regiment co-organized the Mountain Rally in Sanok. In 1938, the regiment honored the Sanok City Council with its badge. That year, a guesthouse was built at 30 2 Pułku Strzelców Podhalańskich Street for rest and meals. The Podhalanka restaurant operated at 3 Adam Mickiewicz Street. The Podhalanin cinema operated at the Polish Soldier's Home at 14 Adam Mickiewicz Street. The 2nd Podhale Rifles Consumer Cooperative and a branch library of the Polish White Cross, with about 150 books in 1933, also operated. During World War II, under German occupation, Stefan Stefański saved part of the regimental library, later donating 500 volumes to the Central Military Library.

The regimental holiday was celebrated on 23 September, commemorating the 1920 battle against the Red Army at Kuźnica.

The District Recruitment Command was located at 9 John III Sobieski Street, and the military police post at 7 Zamkowa Street.

After 1930, Teresa Dłużniakiewicz, wife of Colonel Janusz Dłużniakiewicz, founded the Sanok branch of the Military Family Association. Later, Irena Szpakowska, wife of Lieutenant Colonel Czesław Szpakowski, served as its president. Photographs of the regiment were taken by Franciszek Strachocki, whose studio was opposite the barracks on Adam Mickiewicz Street.

== September Campaign ==
In summer 1939, the Sanok County citizens donated 47,857.84 PLN for military equipment, collected by the County Army Gift Committee, with records transferred to the Sanok Land Museum.

On the night of 4 September, the regiment retreated through Wolbrom, Działoszyce, and Skalbmierz to the Nida river. The first battle occurred at Mękarzowice on 7 September. On 9 September, under Colonel Leopold Endel-Ragis, the regiment fought heavily at Bronina, then moved to Stopnica, where it clashed with German forces. The division reached Rytwiany, planning a feint attack on Staszów. On 10 September, the division was defeated by the German 5th Panzer Division. The regiment broke through to the Mokre forest, gathering survivors from the 5th Podhale Rifles Infantry Regiment. The regimental staff stayed at the Grzybowska forester's lodge with forester Józef Jedynak, but was soon surrounded by German forces and forced to surrender. Officers and non-commissioned officers were taken prisoner, while soldiers were released. The Germans seized the regiment's weapons and equipment.

With the chief of staff's consent, Józef Jedynak hid the regimental banner. In spring 1941, fearing searches, it was moved to Sichów Duży and stored with the Pikul family, then from 1943 with the Witkowski family in Wilkowa. In August 1944, it returned to Jedynak's lodge in the Mokre forest. In 1957, after refusing to join the Communist Party, the Jedynak family was evicted and relocated to Staszów with the banner, staying with the Strojny family. In 1960, they moved to their new home at 19 Oględowska Street. In 1963, Jedynak informed military authorities in Kielce about the banner. General Mieczysław Moczar arrived with an escort, and as Jedynak retrieved the banner from the attic, military honors were rendered. The banner was taken to Warsaw and, in the presence of Polish Army and Polish United Workers' Party representatives, Jedynak handed it over to the Polish Army Museum after 24 years of safekeeping.

Many officers were interned at Oflag VII-A Murnau, where food was supplied through Oskar Schmidt, a brewery lessee in Zarszyn, and Mieczysław Granatowski, codenamed Gram, commander of the Sanok District of the Union of Armed Struggle and Home Army.

== Podhale Rifles ==
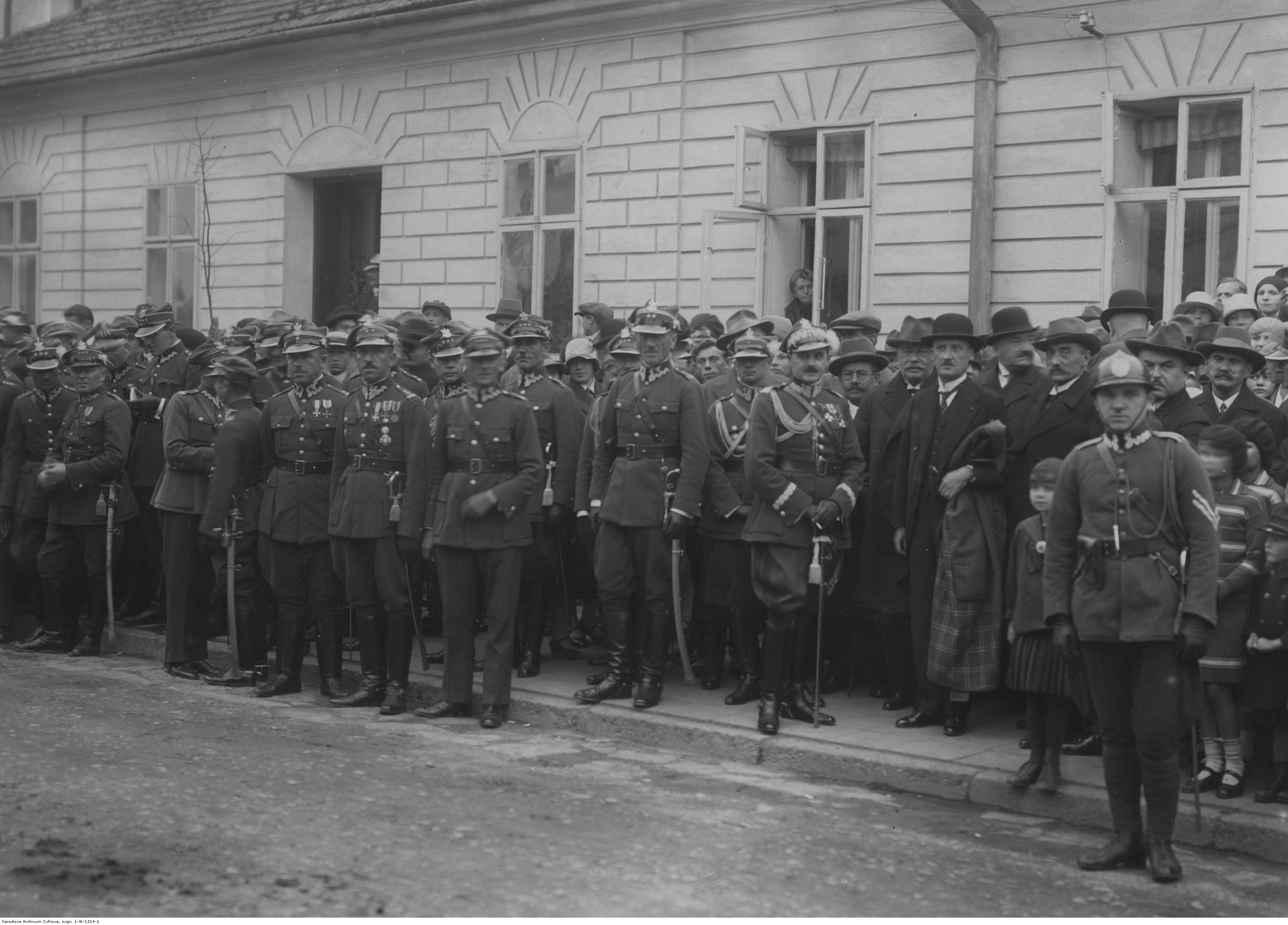
Regimental holiday in Sanok – officers receiving the parade, 1928

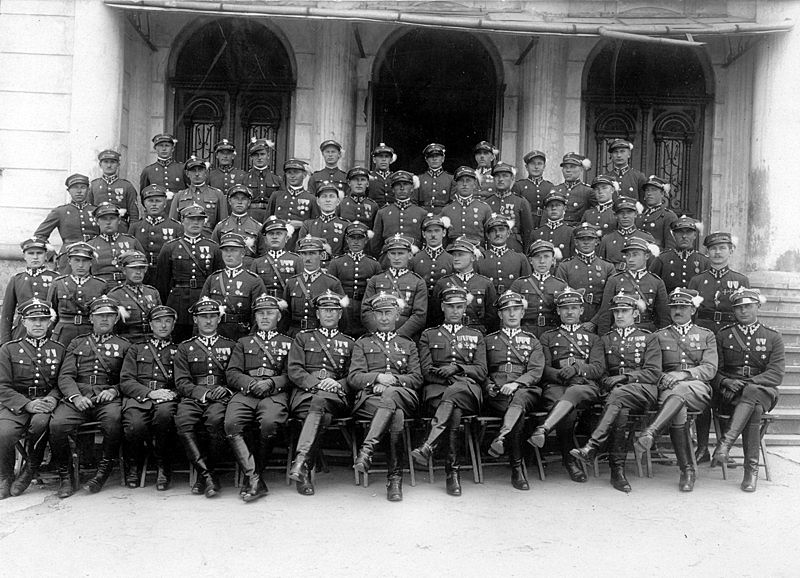
Group photo of non-commissioned officers and officers before the Polish Soldier's Home in Sanok, 1931

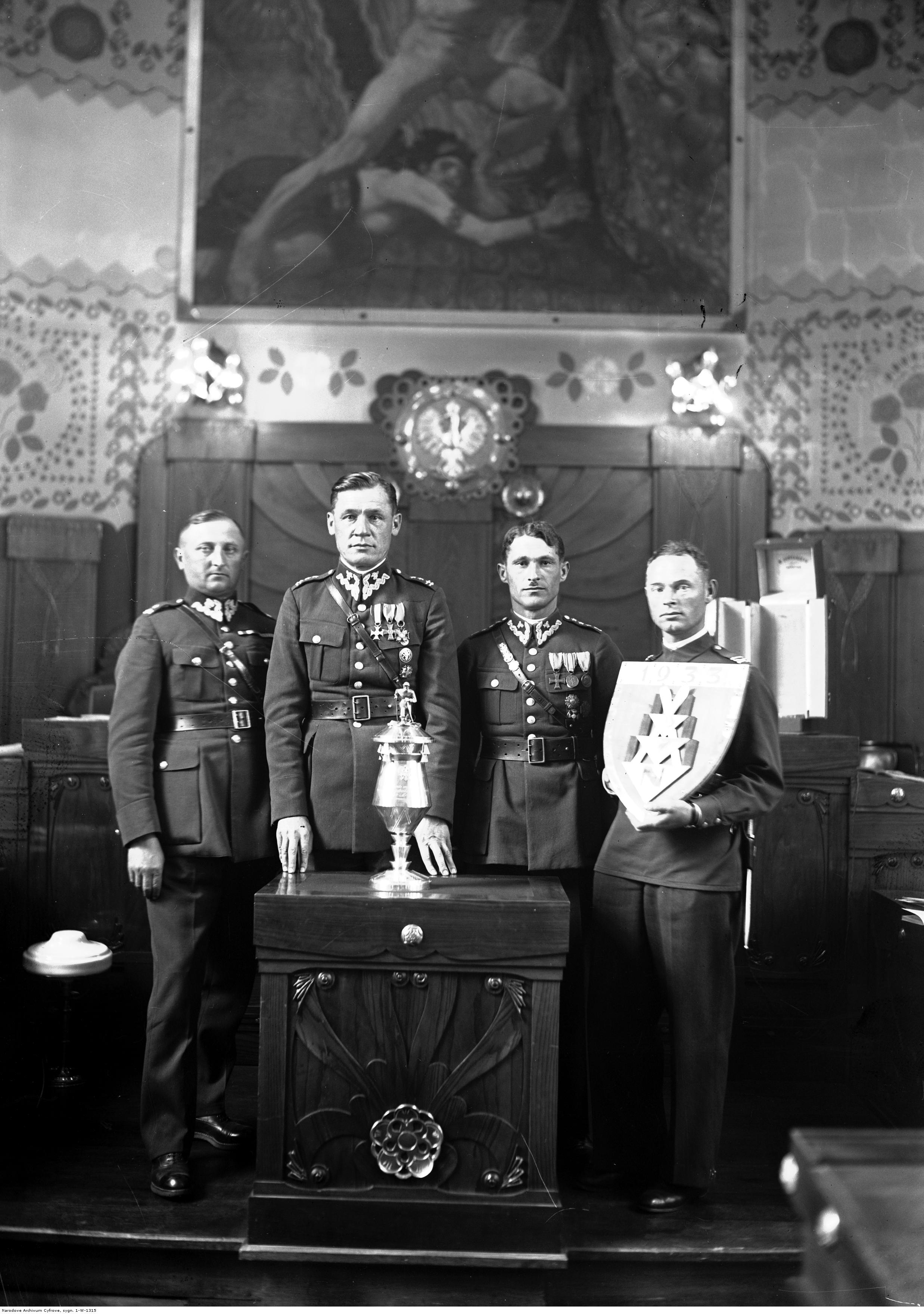
Ski team of the 2nd Podhale Rifles Regiment with a trophy, 1933

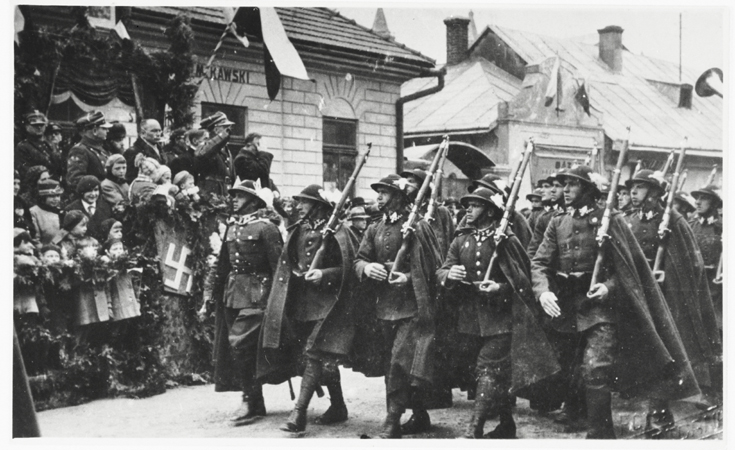
Regimental holiday – parade on Tadeusz Kościuszko Street, 1936

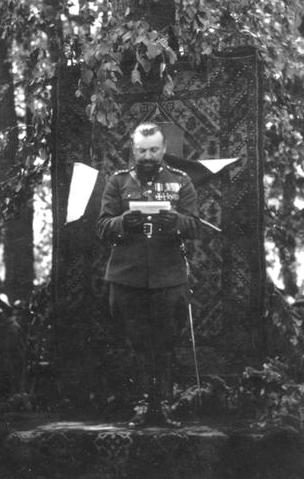
Zygmunt Cšadek, regiment commander and later Sejm deputy, Stara Wieś, 29 May 1938

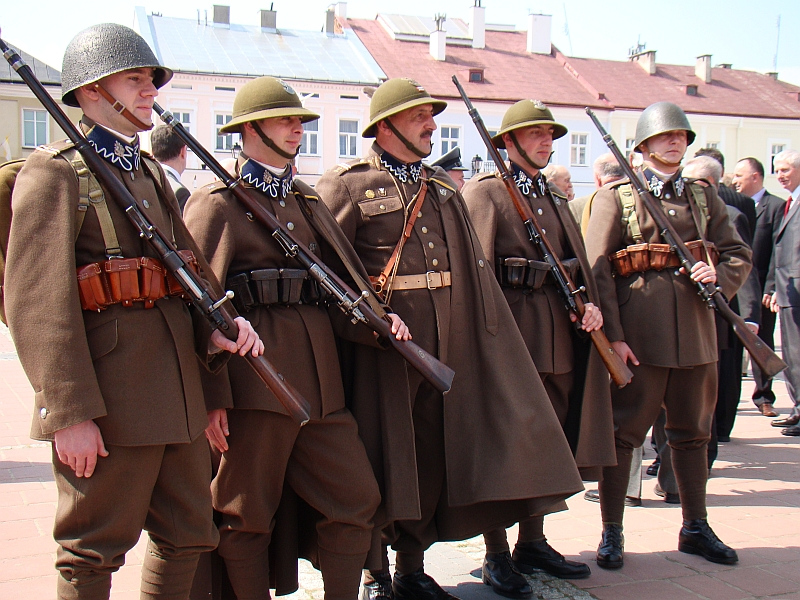
Sanok Podhale Rifles, 2011

=== Regimental commanders ===
- General Jerzy Dobrodzicki (1918–1919)
- Lieutenant Colonel Stanisław Wróblewski (1919–1920)
- Major Edward Kańczucki (1920)
- Colonel Gustaw Truskolaski (16 April 1920 – 28 February 1922)
- Colonel Franciszek Stutzmann (until July 1922 → commander of the 84th Polesie Rifles Regiment)
- Colonel Edmund Koczorowski (until March 1923 → commander 43rd Rifles Regiment of the Bayonne Legion)
- Colonel Franciszek Stutzmann (March 1923 – 22 July 1927 → member of the Officers' Adjudicating Tribunal)
- Lieutenant Colonel Eugeniusz Zuger (22 July 1927 – 31 March 1930)
- Colonel Janusz Dłużniakiewicz (31 March 1930 – † 19 October 1932)
- Lieutenant Colonel Karol Świnarski (28 June 1933 – † 17 November 1935)
- Lieutenant Colonel Karol Lenczowski (27 November 1935 – † 22 July 1936)
- Colonel Zygmunt Cšadek (13 June 1936 – 1 December 1938)
- Lieutenant Colonel Stefan Szlaszewski (1 December 1938 – 10 September 1939)

=== Deputy commanders (from 1938 – First Deputy Commander) ===
- Lieutenant Colonel Karol Paryłowski (10 July 1922 – 1923 → deputy commander of the 11th Infantry Regiment)
- Major/Lieutenant Colonel Franciszek Stok (March 1924 – January 1928)
- Lieutenant Colonel Czesław Szpakowski (26 April 1928 – 12 March 1929 → acting commander of the Sanok Regional Recruitment Command)
- Lieutenant Colonel Eng. Józef Mara-Meÿer (27 April 1929 – 28 January 1931 → commander of the Włodzimierz Wołyński Regional Recruitment Command)
- Lieutenant Colonel Rafał Zieleniewski (28 January – 23 October 1931 → deputy commander of the 41st Suwałki Infantry Regiment)
- Lieutenant Colonel Kazimierz Szydłowski (23 October 1931 – 20 May 1932 → Zakopane post commander)
- Lieutenant Colonel Józef Giza (20 May 1932 – 4 July 1935 → commander of the 3rd Podhale Rifles Regiment)
- Lieutenant Colonel Adam Jan Lewicki (4 July 1935 – 1937)
- Lieutenant Colonel Stanisław Styrczula (1936–1939; † 1940 Katyn massacre – Kharkiv)

=== Quartermaster (from 1938 – Second Deputy Commander) ===
- Major Józef Zych (1923–1924 → 1st Battalion commander)
- Major Dr. Władysław Kumor (1925)
- Major Jan Marcińczyk (August 1925 – February 1927 → at the disposal of the regimental commander)
- Major Antoni Szczur (February 1927 – 26 April 1928)
- Major Andrzej Bogacz (26 April 1928 – 31 March 1930 → commander of the Ostróg Battalion)
- Major Leon Krajewski (31 March 1930 – 20 September 1933)
- Major Jan Stanisław Matuszek (April 1934 – ? → deputy commander of the 5th Podhale Rifles Infantry Regiment)
- Major Stanisław Stahlberger (until 1939)

=== Officers and non-commissioned officers ===
- Lieutenant Colonel Aleksander Fuglewicz (supernumerary in 1923 and 1924; then commander of the County Recruitment Office in Jasło, based in Sanok)
- Lieutenant Colonel Jan Matuszek (served in the 1920s and 1930s)
- Lieutenant Colonel Władysław Śpiewak (served in 1920)
- Lieutenant Colonel Józef Kępski (commander of the 3rd Battalion in 1923 and 1924)
- Major Kazimierz Zboiński (commander of the 1st Battalion until 1939)
- Major Stanisław Brych (commander of the 2nd Battalion in 1928, later commander of the County Recruitment Office in Sanok)
- Major Borys Fournier (served from 1921 to 1926, commander of the 1st Battalion in 1924)
- Major Tadeusz Knopp (served in the 1920s, company commander, commander of the 1st Battalion in 1928)
- Major Leon Krajewski
- Major Karol Matzenauer (commander of the 1st Battalion in 1923)
- Major Aleksander Sabliński (acting commander of the reserve battalion cadre in 1923, 1924)
- Major Marian Szulc (1932)
- Captain Stanisław Lityński (served from 1919 to 1921, company and battalion commander)
- Major Jerzy Pajączkowski-Dydyński (supernumerary officer in the first half of the 1920s)
- Major Józef Zborzil (supernumerary officer in 1922, 1923, and 1924)
- Major Kazimierz Biernat (served from 1930 to 1932)
- Major Tadeusz Deschu (1922)
- Major Stefan Kossecki (supernumerary officer in 1923 and 1924)
- Major Rudolf Kostecki (supernumerary officer in 1923)
- Major Marian Kowalski
- Major Tadeusz Ochęduszko
- Major Franciszek Orawiec (served from 1919 to 1930)
- Major Wojciech Piasecki
- Major Stefan Stolarz (company commander in 1920)
- Major Wacław Szokalski (served in 1924)
- Second Lieutenant Adam Trybus (platoon commander in 1939)
- Major Marian Wieroński (1930s)
- Reserve Major Doctor Józef Wincenty Wojnar
- Senior Corporal Bronisław Nowyk (chaplain of the military parish of Christ the King)
- Captain Stanisław Karnibad (1932)
- Captain Doctor Karol Bachman (physician in 1932)
- Captain Doctor Leopold Dręgiewicz (dentist)
- Captain Doctor Jan Maria Suchomel (regimental physician from 22 July 1937 5 to December 1938)
- Captain Jan Bartczak (during the war of 1918–1921)
- Captain Kazimierz Damm (1932)
- Captain Wacław Jastrzębski (1932)
- Captain Gracjan Fróg, codenamed Szczerbiec (served from 1933 to 1936)
- Captain Stanisław Godawa (1932)
- Captain Eugeniusz Halski (served in 1919)
- Captain Stefan Halski (served in 1919)
- Captain Aleksander Kolasiński (1920s)
- Captain Wojciech Korwin-Kossakowski (mobilization officer in 1932)
- Captain Tadeusz Kuniewski (district commander of Physical Training until 1939)
- Captain Antoni Kurka (1923, 1924)
- Captain Franciszek Löwy (1920s and 1930s)
- Captain Rudolf Mleczko
- Captain Bronisław Poplatek (1920s until 1927, company commander)
- Captain Paweł Rosa (1918–1932, company commander, mobilization officer)
- Captain Fryderyk Rużyczka (reserve officer in 1923 and 1924)
- Captain Bronisław Sapecki (reserve officer in 1923 and 1924)
- Captain Marian Suda (1920s and 1930s)
- Captain Franciszek Szafran (reserve officer in 1923 and 1924)
- Captain Marian Warmuzek (1918–1933)
- Captain Michał Wieruszewski (served in 1920)
- Captain Kazimierz Wojakowski (regimental bandmaster in the 1920s)
- Captain Edward Zegarski (supernumerary)
- Lieutenant Stanisław Beksiński (reserve officer in 1923)
- Lieutenant Jan Dulęba (served from 1921)
- Lieutenant Maksymilian Firek (regimental bandmaster in the 1920s)
- Lieutenant Aleksander Florkowski (served from 1930 to 1934, platoon commander)
- Lieutenant Tadeusz Gutowski (reserve exercises in the 1920s)
- Lieutenant Józef Hartman
- Lieutenant Józef Kuraś, codenamed Ogień (served from 1936)
- Lieutenant Edward Łabno (served from 1931 to 1939, company commander)
- Lieutenant Ludwik Migdał (district commander of Physical Training)
- Lieutenant Bolesław Müller (reservist in the 1930s, reserve officer)
- Lieutenant Wilhelm Obrzut (1920s)
- Lieutenant Stefan Rychalski (during the war of 1918–1921)
- Lieutenant Józef Sitarz
- Lieutenant Tadeusz Słotołowicz (reservist in the 1920s and 1930s)
- Lieutenant Stanisław Socha (supernumerary in 1923)
- Lieutenant Paweł Staroń (station commander and border commander at the Czechoslovak border in 1919)
- Lieutenant Stanisław Węgrzynowski (regimental bandmaster in the 1930s)
- Lieutenant Michał Wieruszewski (during the war of 1918–1921)
- Lieutenant Leon Winiarski (commander of the 5th company at the turn of 1918/1919)
- Lieutenant Jakub Zaleski (served in 1920)
- Lieutenant Władysław Zaleski (reserve officer in 1923)
- Second Lieutenant Zygmunt Bezucha (reservist in the 1930s)
- Second Lieutenant Władysław Godula (served in the first half of the 1930s)
- Second Lieutenant Mieczysław Granatowski (mobilized and served in 1939)
- Second Lieutenant Bronisław Jahn (reservist from 1935 to 1939)
- Second Lieutenant Eugeniusz Kaliciński (reservist from 1918 to 1919)
- Second Lieutenant Bronisław Kamiński (mobilized and served in 1939)
- Second Lieutenant Józef Kucza (mobilized and served in 1939)
- Second Lieutenant Ferdynand Piwowar (mobilized and served in 1939)
- Second Lieutenant Józef Rymarowicz (reservist in the 1930s, platoon commander)
- Second Lieutenant Wojciech Walczak (military service in 1935)
- Second Lieutenant Franciszek Wanic (reserve officer in the 1920s)
- Second Lieutenant Józef Wątróbski (mobilized and served in 1939)
- Second Lieutenant Tadeusz Żurowski (reserve officer in the 1930s)
- Officer Cadet Ludwik Warchał (mobilized and served in 1939)
- Warrant Officer Jan Ratułowski
- Sergeant Władysław Szelka (instructor)
- Platoon Leader Stanisław Brzana (served in 1939)
- Platoon Leader Zbigniew Dańczyszyn (1939)
- Platoon Leader Piotr Dudycz
- Platoon Leader Władysław Wiśniowski
- Anatol Gupieniec (mobilized and served in 1939)
- Józef Stachowicz (volunteer in the ranks of the reserve battalion)
- Mikołaj Szwan (regular military service, September Campaign 1939)

=== Personnel and organizational structure in March 1939 ===
- Regiment Commander: Lieutenant Colonel Stefan Szlaszewski
- First Deputy Commander: Lieutenant Colonel Stanisław Styrczula
- Adjutant: Captain Bolesław Jus
- Senior Physician: Captain Doctor Tadeusz Wyspiański
- Junior Physician: Second Lieutenant Physician Jan Zielina
- Sanok Garrison Officer: Captain Edward Solon
- Second Deputy Commander (Quartermaster): Major Stanisław Stahlberger
- Mobilization Officer: Captain (Administrative, Infantry) Marian Franciszek Pazucha
- Deputy Mobilization Officer: Captain (Administrative, Infantry) Wojciech Korwin-Kossakowski
- Administrative-Material Officer: Captain Wacław Mateusz Tomczak
- Economic Officer: Captain (Intendant) Ludwik Józef Chrobak
- Food Supply Officer: Warrant Officer Tadeusz Koszyk
- Commander of the Economic Company and Transport Officer: Lieutenant (Transport) Karol Palczon
- Bandmaster: Second Lieutenant (Administrative, Bandmaster) Władysław Skawina
- Commander of the Communications Platoon: Lieutenant Franciszek Józef Urbuś
- Commander of the Pioneer Platoon: Lieutenant Bolesław Graff
- Commander of the Infantry Artillery Platoon: Lieutenant (Artillery) Bohdan Ciepliński
- Commander of the Anti-Tank Platoon: Lieutenant Władysław Zbigniew Nireński
- Commander of the Reconnaissance Unit: Lieutenant Jan Stała
- 1st Battalion:
  - Battalion Commander: Major Kazimierz Zboiński
  - Commander of the 1st Company: Captain Antoni Wayda
  - Platoon Commander: Second Lieutenant Karol Mieczysław Kielar
  - Commander of the 2nd Company: Lieutenant Stanisław Józef Rybczyk
  - Platoon Commander: Second Lieutenant Jan Kazimierz Karwasiński
  - Commander of the 3rd Company: Lieutenant Edward Stanisław Zych
  - Platoon Commander: Lieutenant Jan Matuszewicz
  - Platoon Commander: Lieutenant Stanisław Bes
  - Platoon Commander: Lieutenant Józef Mikuła
  - Commander of the 1st Machine Gun Company: Captain Bronisław Jankowski
  - Platoon Commander: Second Lieutenant Marian Józef Chmiel
  - Platoon Commander: Second Lieutenant Kazimierz Mikołaj Piechowicz
- 2nd Battalion:
  - Battalion Commander: Major Stanisław Słomczyński
  - Commander of the 4th Company: Captain Józef Wieteska
  - Platoon Commander: Second Lieutenant Franciszek Malik
  - Platoon Commander: Warrant Officer Jan Ratułowski
  - Commander of the 5th Company: Captain Edward Solon
  - Platoon Commander: Second Lieutenant Józef Mrozek
  - Commander of the 6th Company: Captain Tadeusz Kazimierz Dyląg
  - Platoon Commander: Lieutenant Władysław Sochański
  - Commander of the 2nd Machine Gun Company: Captain Edward Kantor
  - Platoon Commander: Lieutenant Artur Ignacy Weber
- 3rd Battalion:
  - Battalion Commander: Major Kazimierz Tumidajski
  - Commander of the 7th Company: Captain Józef Lubowiecki
  - Platoon Commander: Second Lieutenant Jan Szymon Pitulko
  - Commander of the 8th Company: Captain Hipolit Kułakowski
  - Platoon Commander: Second Lieutenant Stanisław Buczkowski
  - Platoon Commander: Second Lieutenant Antoni Frejer
  - Commander of the 9th Company: Captain Kazimierz II Grzybowski
  - Platoon Commander: Second Lieutenant Bronisław Stachowiec
  - Commander of the 3rd Machine Gun Company: Lieutenant Edward Łabno
  - Platoon Commander: Second Lieutenant Czesław Dobrowolski
  - On Course: Lieutenant Józef Kukula
  - On Course: Lieutenant Janusz Stanisław Michalik
  - Detached: Second Lieutenant Jan Kubiak

=== Personnel structure in September 1939 ===
- Command:
  - Regiment Commander: Lieutenant Colonel Stefan Szlaszewski
  - First Adjutant: Captain Tadeusz Kazimierz Dyląg
  - Second Adjutant: Reserve Lieutenant Władysław Kochanek
  - Intelligence Officer: Reserve Second Lieutenant Władysław Gąsiorek
  - Communications Officer: Captain Józef Lubowiecki
  - Quartermaster: Captain Edward Solon
  - Paymaster Officer: Captain Ludwik Chrobak
  - Food Supply Officer: Warrant Officer Tadeusz Koszyk
  - Chief Physician: Captain Physician Doctor Tadeusz Wyspiański
  - Chaplain: Senior Corporal Roman Kostikow
  - Commander of the Economic Company: Captain Bolesław Jus
- 1st Battalion:
  - Commander of the I Battalion: Major (Infantry) Marian Jankowski
  - Battalion Adjutant: Reserve Second Lieutenant Kazimierz Józefczyk
  - Commander of the 1st Rifle Company: Captain Antoni Wayda
  - Commander of the 2nd Rifle Company: Lieutenant Józef Kukuła
  - Commander of the 3rd Rifle Company: Second Lieutenant Karol Mieczysław Kielar
  - Commander of the 1st Machine Gun Company: Lieutenant Józef Mikuła
- 2nd Battalion:
  - Commander of the II Battalion: Major Stanisław Słomczyński
  - Battalion Adjutant: Unknown
  - Commander of the 4th Rifle Company: Lieutenant Jan Matuszewicz
  - Commander of the 5th Rifle Company: Second Lieutenant Józef Mrozek
  - Commander of the 6th Rifle Company: Lieutenant Edward Stanisław Zych
  - Commander of the 2nd Machine Gun Company: Second Lieutenant Kazimierz Piechowicz
- 3rd Battalion:
  - Commander of the III Battalion: Major Kazimierz Tumidajski
  - Battalion Adjutant: Lieutenant Stanisław Rybczyk
  - Commander of the 7th Rifle Company: Second Lieutenant Jan Kubiak
  - Commander of the 8th Rifle Company: Captain Hipolit Kułakowski
  - Commander of the 9th Rifle Company: Second Lieutenant Franciszek Malik
  - Commander of the 3rd Machine Gun Company: Lieutenant Janusz Michalik
- Special units:
  - Commander of the Anti-Tank Company: Lieutenant Stanisław Bes
  - Commander of the Infantry Artillery Platoon: Lieutenant Bohdan Ciepliński
  - Commander of the Reconnaissance Company: Lieutenant Jan Stała
  - Commander of the Technical Company: Unknown
  - Commander of the Pioneer Platoon: Reserve Second Lieutenant Mirosław Tomasz Nadziakiewicz
  - Commander of the Anti-Gas Platoon: Lieutenant Władysław Sochański

=== Victims of the Katyn massacre ===
Name	Rank	Profession	Place of employment before mobilization	Place of execution
Kazimierz Brzana	Second Lieutenant (Reserve)	Lawyer	Tax office in Krosno	Katyn
Władysław Burtan	Second Lieutenant (Reserve)	Clerk	Tax chamber in Kraków	Katyn
Władysław Kosibowicz	Second Lieutenant (Reserve)	–	–	Katyn
Władysław Parfiński	Second Lieutenant (Reserve)	Teacher	–	Katyn
Bolesław Reger	Second Lieutenant (Reserve)	Jagiellonian University graduate	Worked in Jasło	Katyn
Tadeusz Słotołowicz	Lieutenant (Reserve)	Lawyer	–	Katyn
Zdzisław Sukiennik	Second Lieutenant (Reserve)	Technician	Polish State Railways (PKP) in Jasło	Katyn
Emil Josefsberg	Lieutenant (Reserve)	Engineer	–	Kharkiv
Jan Marynowski	Second Lieutenant (Reserve)	Teacher	School in Dolna near Gorlice	Kharkiv
Stanisław Matlak	Second Lieutenant (Reserve)	Clerk	Road construction company in Krynica	Kharkiv
Alojzy Pojasek	Second Lieutenant (Reserve)	Teacher	School in Wola Komborska	Kharkiv
Józef Rymanowicz	Second Lieutenant (Reserve)	Engineer	–	Kharkiv
Władysław Wianecki	Second Lieutenant (Reserve)	Teacher	–	Kharkiv
Adam Heppé	Second Lieutenant (Reserve)	Forestry engineer	–	Starobilsk (ULK)
Ozjasz Kudysz	Second Lieutenant (Reserve)	Merchant	–	Starobilsk (ULK)
Stanisław Brzana	Platoon Sergeant	–	–	Kalinin

== Regimental standard and insignia ==
=== Commemorative badge ===
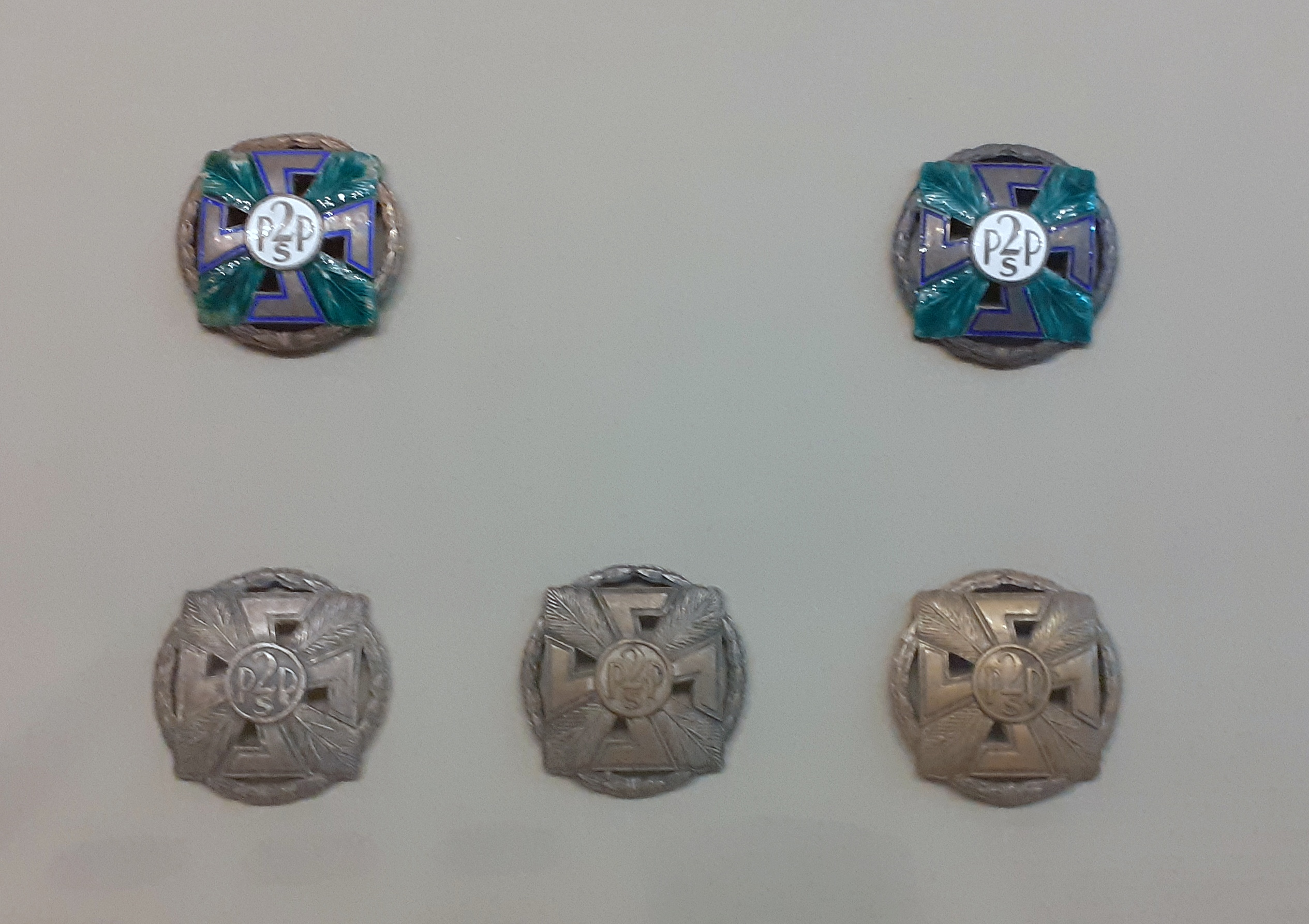
Regimental badges

On 16 October 1929, the Minister of Military Affairs, Marshal of Poland Józef Piłsudski, approved the design and regulations for the commemorative badge of the 2nd Podhale Rifles Regiment. The badge, measuring 37x37 mm, is shaped like a Greek cross with bent arms (swastika) and features a dark blue border with a circular white enameled shield. It was awarded in accordance with the principles established by the Ministry of Military Affairs in 1928. Officers' badges were made of silver, while soldiers' badges were made of tombac, silver-plated, and patinated. Each badge was numbered, and a record was kept of the recipients. Most badges were crafted by the engraving workshop of Wiktor Gontarczyk, located in Warsaw at 19 Miodowa Street.

=== Standard ===
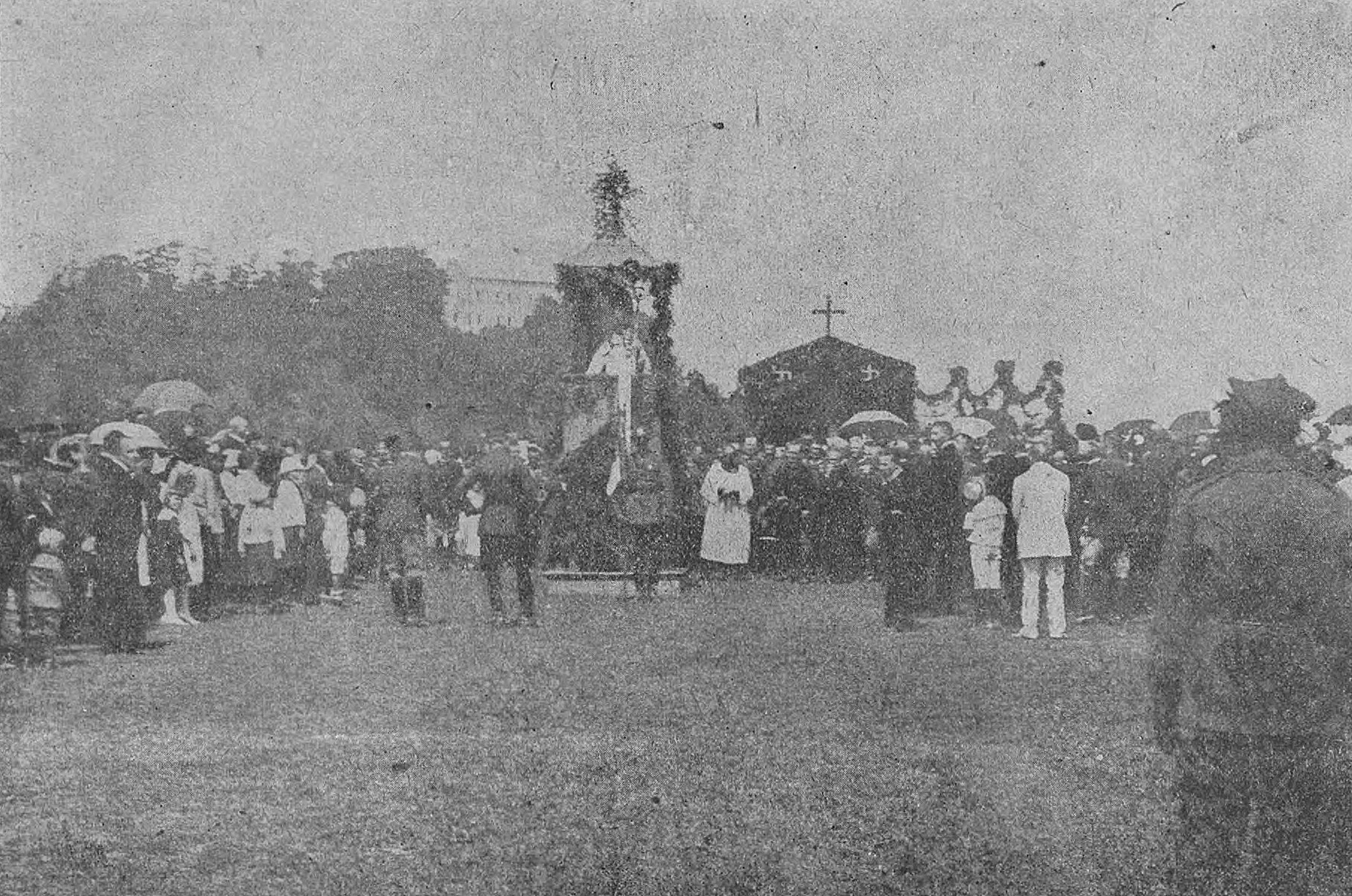
Ceremony to dedicate the regimental standard

On 15 July 1923, General Lucjan Żeligowski presented the regiment with its standard, which was consecrated by Bishop Józef Sebastian Pelczar.

=== Gorget ===
The 2nd Podhale Rifles Regiment received a gorget (a traditional Polish military plaque) as a gift from the Riflemen's Associations in Sanok, Lesko, and Krosno. The regiment's commander, Colonel Zygmunt Cšadek, decided to offer it as a votive offering to the Basilica of the Assumption of the Blessed Virgin Mary in nearby Stara Wieś. On 29 May 1938, the regiment's soldiers marched to the basilica, where the gorget was hung on the image of the Miraculous Mother of God, and a solemn oath was taken.

== Commemoration ==
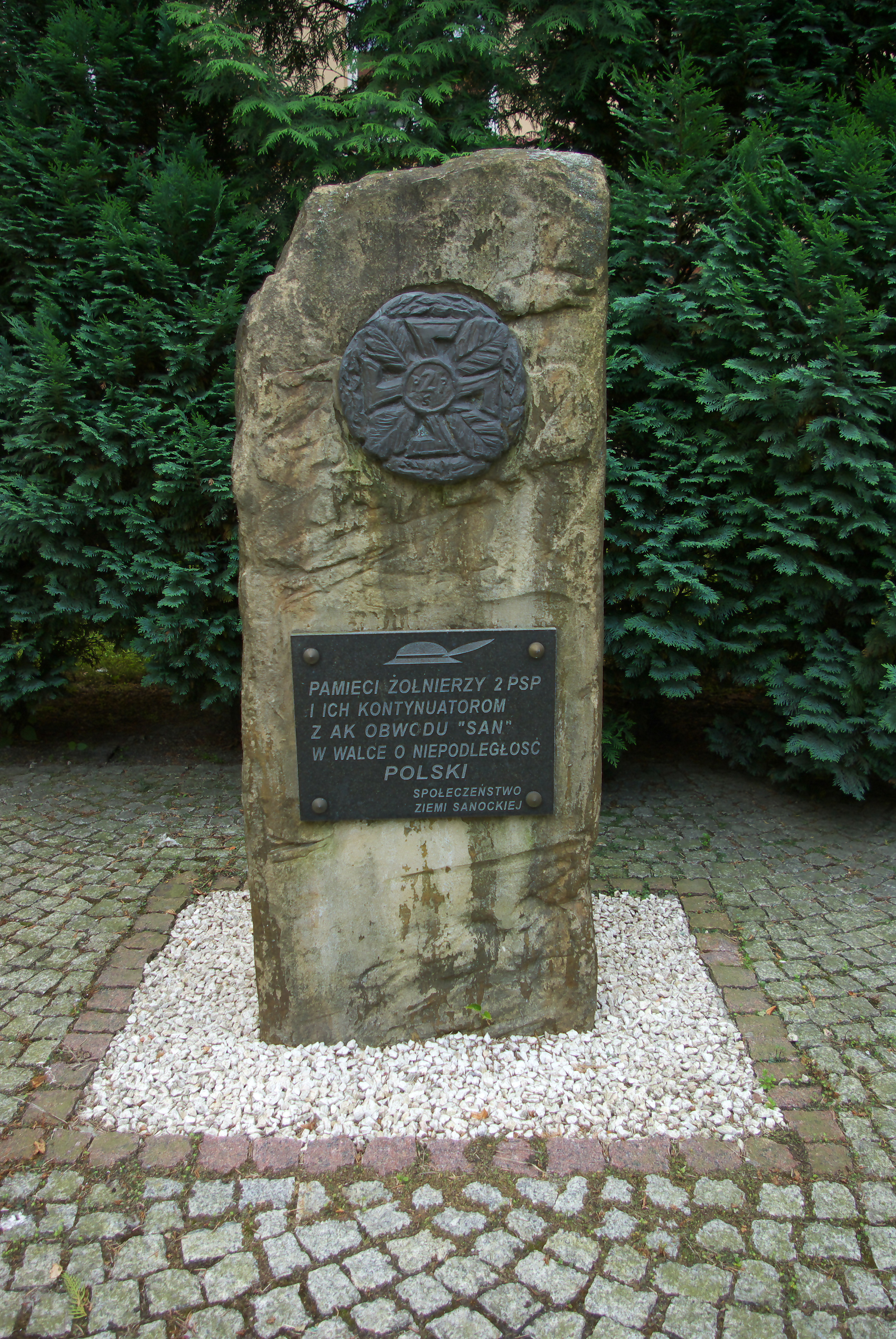
Monument commemorating the 2nd Podhale Rifles Regiment and the Home Army in Sanok

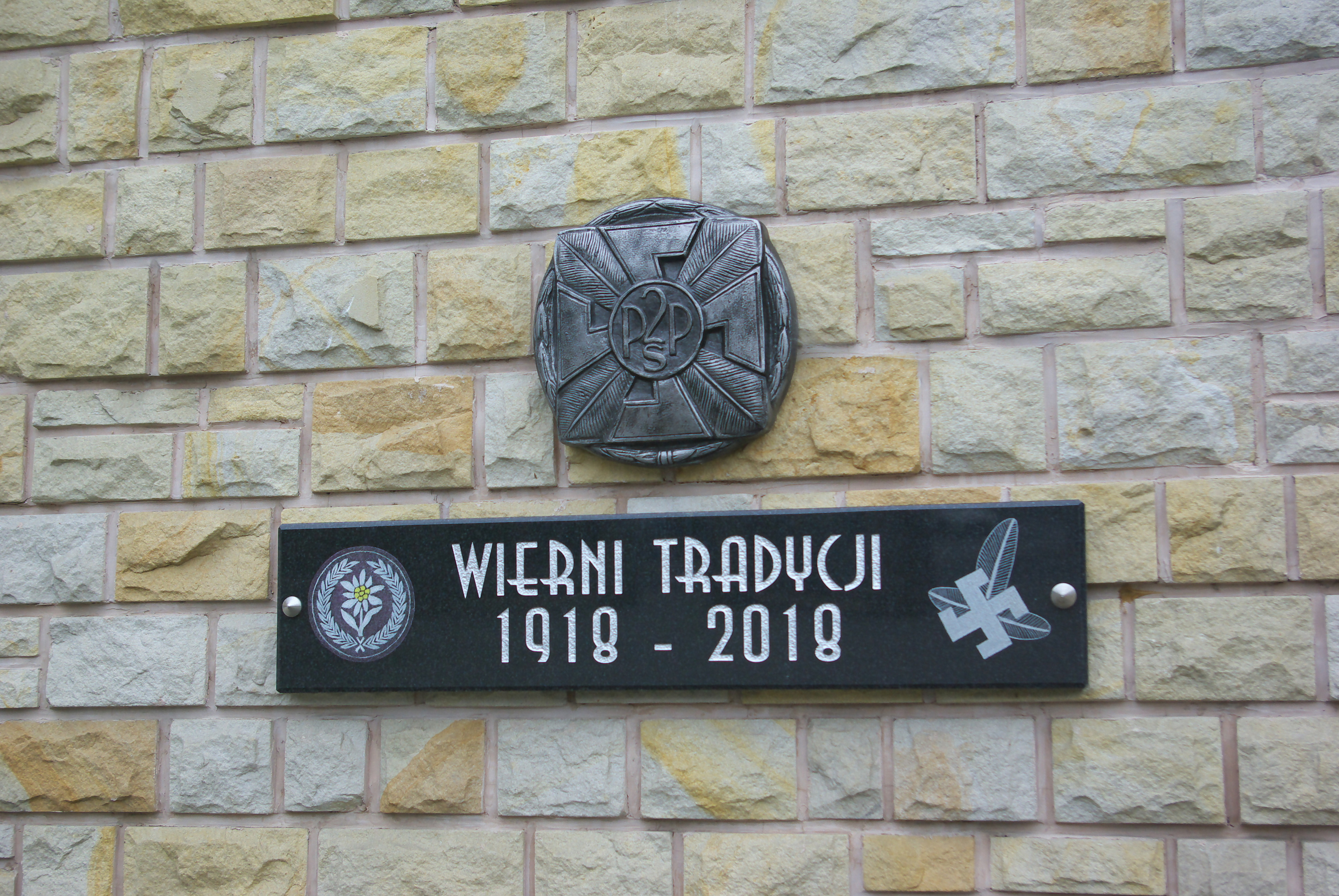
Commemoration of the 2nd Podhale Rifles Regiment at Scouts Square in Sanok

From 10 November 1993 to 11 January 1994, an exhibition titled "Podhalanie" was held in the Zajazd building, the seat of the Sanok Historical Museum. It was the first exhibition dedicated to the 2nd Podhale Rifles Regiment, created by Andrzej Romaniak. A monument was established in Chyrów.

In Sanok, several permanent commemorations of the 2nd Podhale Rifles Regiment have been made:

- In 1981, the historical commission of the Sanok branch of the Society of Fighters for Freedom and Democracy proposed to the city authorities that one of the streets in Sanok be named after the 2nd Podhale Rifles Regiment, which was not realized at the time. Ultimately, Marceli Nowotka Street, previously Elżbieta Granowska Street, was renamed 2nd Podhale Rifles Regiment Street.
- A commemorative plaque was placed on the facade of the Church of the Transfiguration to honor the memory of the soldiers of the Union of Armed Struggle and the Home Army and their commanders (Michał Tokarzewski-Karaszewicz, Tadeusz Bór-Komorowski, Leopold Okulicki), as well as the soldiers of the 2nd Podhale Rifles Regiment who were stationed in Sanok until 1939. The inscription reads: "To the soldiers of the Union of Armed Struggle and the Home Army and their commanders General M. Tokarzewski 'Torwid', General S. Rowecki 'Grot', General T. Komorowski 'Bór', General L. Okulicki 'Niedźwiadek'. To the soldiers of the 2nd Podhale Rifles Regiment. On the 42nd anniversary of the departure of the 'Południe' partisan unit. The people of the Sanok region. A.D. 1986". It was consecrated and unveiled on 6 July 1986 by Father Prelate Jan Stączek.
- A commemorative stone honoring the 2nd Podhale Rifles Regiment was established in front of the building at 21 Adam Mickiewicz Street, formerly military barracks and now the seat of the Jan Grodek State University. It was unveiled on 3 October 1993. The monument commemorates the soldiers of the 2nd Podhale Rifles Regiment and the Home Army. The obelisk was designed by Senior Warrant Officer Andrzej Siwiec. The monument features the emblem of the 2nd Podhale Rifles Regiment and a plaque with the inscription: "In memory of the soldiers of the 2nd Podhale Rifles Regiment and their successors from the Home Army 'SAN' District in the fight for Poland's independence. The people of the Sanok Land".
- On 8 October 2018, the Border Guard post in Kuźnica was named after the 2nd Podhale Rifles Regiment, which fought battles against Soviet forces in Kuźnica. A commemorative plaque with the post's name was also unveiled.
- On 8 December 2019, at the initiative of the Union of Veterans and Reservists of the Polish Army, a commemorative plaque was unveiled at Scouts Square dedicated to the 22nd Mountain Division and all regimental badges of this division, including the 2nd Podhale Rifles Regiment from Sanok. The plaque was consecrated by the Przemyśl Garrison Chaplain, Lieutenant Colonel Rafał Kaproń, and the unveiling was performed by Division General Jarosław Gromadziński, commander of the 18th Mechanized Division, Sanok Mayor Tomasz Matuszewski, and the president of the Union of Veterans and Reservists of the Polish Army, Krzysztof Juszczyk.

== See also ==
- Podhale Rifles
