= Jan Grodek State University =

Public vocational university in Sanok, Poland

- Uczelnia Państwowa im. Jana Grodka w Sanoku (Polish)
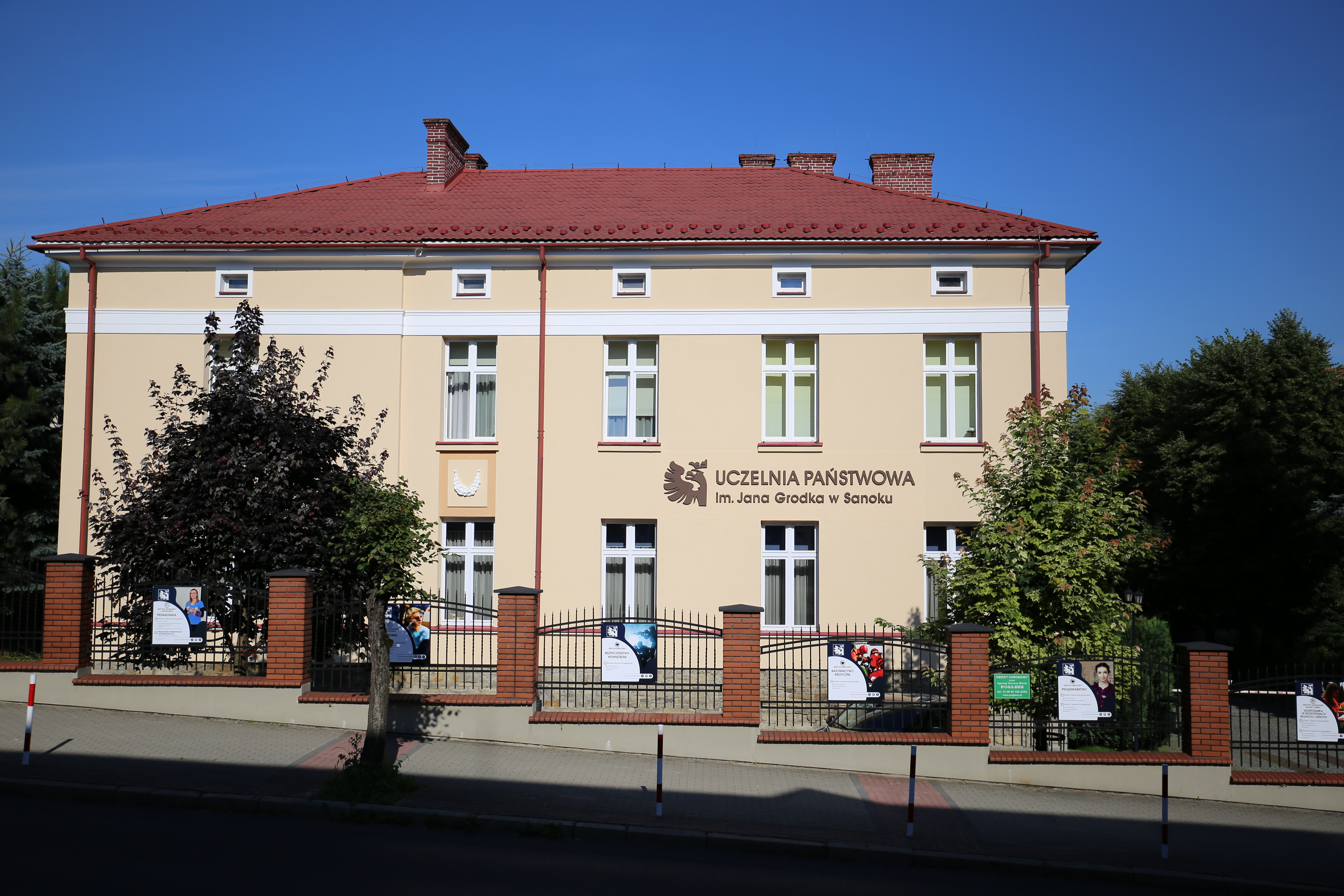
- Building at 21 Adam Mickiewicz Street
- Type: Public vocational university
- Established: 10 April 2001
- Rector: Mateusz Kaczmarski
- Location: 21 Adam Mickiewicz Street, Sanok, Poland; 49°33′50″N 22°12′11″E
- Campus: Urban
- Website: www.up-sanok.edu.pl

Jan Grodek State University is a public vocational university operating in Sanok, Poland, since 2001.

== History ==
Jan Grodek State University in Sanok, originally named the State Higher Vocational School in Sanok, was established by a Council of Ministers regulation on 10 April 2001. The first academic year began on 6 October 2001, with 250 students enrolled in five programs. Initial programs included Polish language, Ukrainian language and culture, Slovak language and culture, Russian language and culture, and Carpathian culture. On 9 May 2002, the Jagiellonian University became a patron of the institution. By the 2003/2004 academic year, nearly 1,500 students were enrolled. On 16 January 2005, the Minister of National Education and Sport designated Jan Grodek, a 16th-century Sanok native and rector of the Jagiellonian University (1540–1541, 1545–1546, 1551–1552), as the university's patron. Consequently, on 26 January 2005, the institution was renamed Jan Grodek State Higher Vocational School in Sanok.

Over the first decade, 2,554 students graduated from the institution.

On 12 August 2019, the Minister of Science and Higher Education renamed the institution Jan Grodek State University in Sanok, effective 1 September 2019.

The university operates under the patronage of the Jagiellonian University (since 9 May 2002), the University of Rzeszów, and the Rzeszów University of Technology. In 2002, the university adopted a coat of arms designed by architect Jarosław Błyskal.

== Buildings ==
Located in the Downtown district, the university occupies former military barracks at Adam Mickiewicz Street, Fryderyk Szopen Street, and Żwirki i Wigury Street. In the late 20th century, local authorities allocated these buildings, located at 21 Adam Mickiewicz Street, to the newly established university. The buildings were renovated and adapted for educational purposes.

The campus buildings are designated as:

- A – administration,
- B – Medical Institute,
- D – since 2007, housing, among others, a gallery,
- E – Sports and Teaching Centre (completed in 2015; its sports hall hosts matches of the men's volleyball team TSV Sanok as well as, since 2016, Wilki Sanok in the floorball league),
- F (former arsenal) – since 2005/2006, initially the Institute of Agriculture, later the Institute of Agricultural and Forestry Economy; also houses the library (established in 2001 from the Pedagogical Library, which had operated on Gregory of Sanok Street), the Foreign Languages Study Centre, and the University of the Third Age.

Building C, located separately at 6 Władysław Reymont Street in the Posada district near the Sanok Rubber Company, has housed the Institute of Mechanics and Machine Construction since 30 October 2003, and since October 2009, the Technical Institute.

== Administration ==
- Rector: Mateusz Kaczmarski (since 2020)
- Vice-Rector: Elżbieta Cipora
- Chancellor: Lesław Siedlecki

Previous rectors include:

- Jan Skoczyński (1 June 2001–2002), appointed by the Minister of National Education for one year and previously the Jagiellonian University's representative for establishing the university.
- Józef Wróbel (2002–2003), elected by the university senate for a four-year term.
- Halina Mieczkowska(2003–2012), elected on 17 June 2003 for a supplementary term until 31 August 2006, and re-elected on 29 May 2006.
- Elżbieta Cipora (2012–2020).

== Academic programs ==
The university offers bachelor's degrees, master's degrees, and integrated master's programs.

- Internal Security
- Economics
- Physiotherapy
- Agricultural and Forest Ecosystem Management
- Computer Science
- Mechanics and Machine Design
- Pedagogy
- Early Childhood and Preschool Education
- Nursing
- Social Work
- Psychology
- Emergency Medical Services

== Awards ==
- Sanok Mayor's Award (2009)
- University of Leaders Certification (2015, 2016, 2017, 2019)

== Commemorations ==
- A commemorative stone honoring the 2nd Podhale Rifles Regiment and the Home Army was erected in front of the building at 21 Adam Mickiewicz Street. Designed by Senior Warrant Officer Andrzej Siwiec, it features the 2nd Podhale Rifles Regiment's emblem and an inscription: "In memory of the soldiers of the 2nd Podhale Rifles Regiment and their successors from the Home Army SAN District in the fight for Poland's independence. The Sanok Region Community".
- In October 2003, the Sanok District Board of the League of Nature Conservation planted a commemorative northern red oak on the university grounds for National Independence Day.
