= Podhale Rifles =

Polish military unit

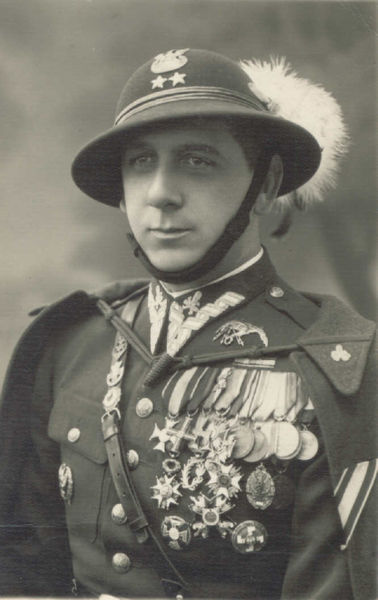
Stefan Szlaszewski in a distinctive uniform of the Podhale Rifles; 1930's, still in the rank of Lt.Col.

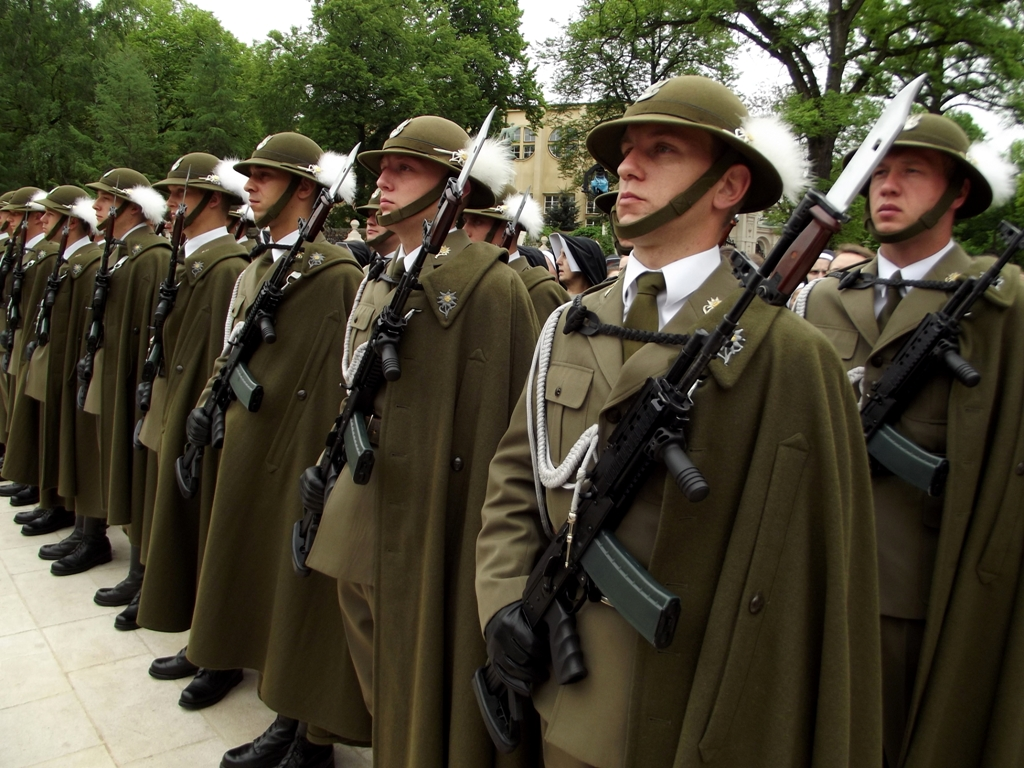
The Representative Honor Guard Unit of the Polish Border Guard in 2013

Podhale Rifles or Podhale Riflemen (Polish: Strzelcy podhalańscy, nicknamed "Podhalańczycy") is the traditional name of the mountain infantry units of the Polish Army. Formed in 1918 out of volunteers of the region of Podhale, in 1919 the smaller detachments of Podhale Rifles were pressed into two mountain infantry divisions, the 21st Mountain Infantry and 22nd Mountain Infantry Divisions, as well as into three brigades of mountain infantry and were considered elite units of the Polish Army.

After the Polish defeat in the Polish September Campaign, the Podhale units were recreated in France as the Polish Independent Highland Brigade, fought at the Battle of Narvik, and later fought in the Battle of France and retreated into Switzerland upon the French defeat. Some units were also created in the underground as part of the partisan forces of the Armia Krajowa. The traditions of the Podhale Rifles are continued by the modern 21st Podhale Rifle Brigade.

The traditional symbols of the Podhale Rifles include the edelweiss flower and the Mountain Cross, a swastika symbol (not related to NSDAP) popular in folk culture of the Polish mountainous regions. The units of Podhale Rifles, both historical and modern, are notable for their high morale and distinctive uniforms. Prior to World War II the mountain units were one of only two infantry units wearing non-standard uniforms based on Mountaineer folk garment rather than military uniforms. This tradition is continued in units such as the Representative Honor Guard Unit of the Polish Border Guard.

== Units and their badges ==
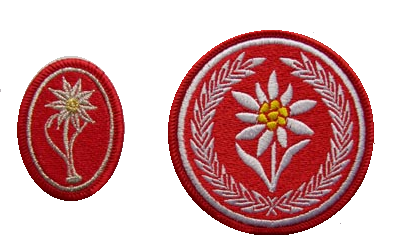
The present Edelweiss insignia

The Highlander Cross badge worn on the collars of the Podhale Rifle Regiment, until 1945

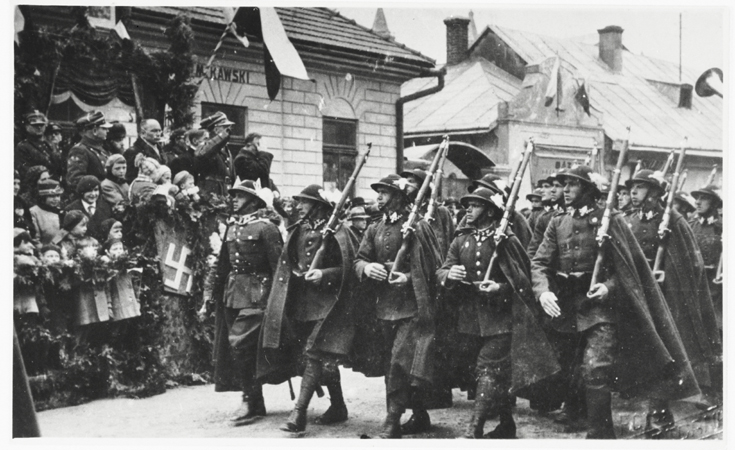
Soldiers of the Polish 2nd Podhale Rifle Regiment in full gala dress-suit, Sanok, 1936

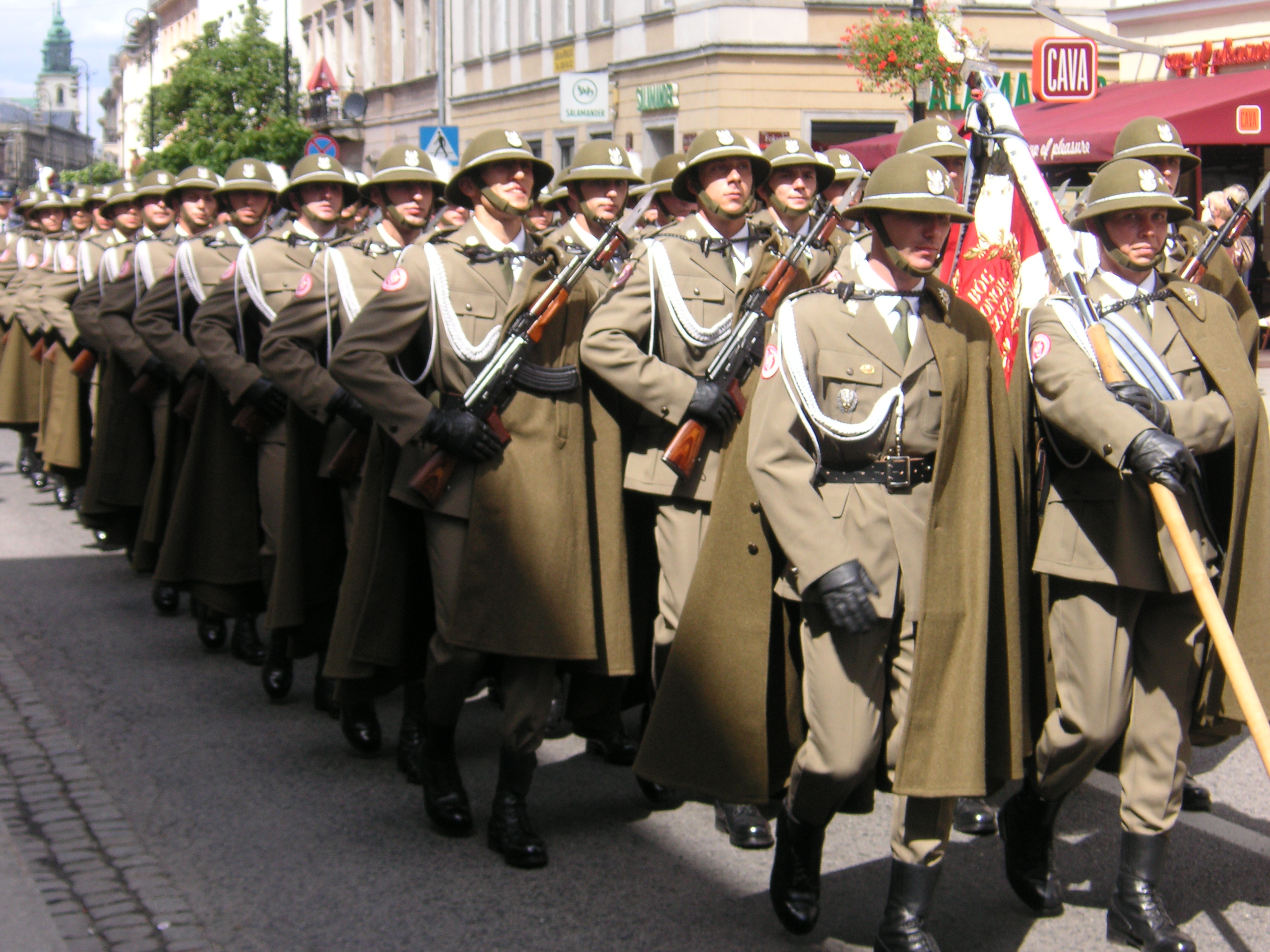
Soldiers of the 21st Podhale Rifle Brigade in full gala dress-suit, Warsaw, 2006

The table below shows the allegiance of the regiments of Podhale Rifles as of September 1, 1939.

| Division or Brigade | Regiment | Notes |
|---|---|---|
| 21st Mountain Infantry Division Kustroń | 3rd Podhale Rifles Regiment; Czubryt | Bielsko-Biała |
| 21st Mountain Infantry Division Kustroń | 4th Podhale Rifles Regiment; Warzybok | Cieszyn |
| 22nd Mountain Infantry Division Engel-Ragis | 2nd Podhale Rifles Regiment; Szlaszewski | Sanok |
| 22nd Mountain Infantry Division Engel-Ragis | 5th Podhale Rifles Regiment; Żółkiewski | Przemyśl |
| 22nd Mountain Infantry Division Engel-Ragis | 6th Podhale Rifles Regiment; Dobrzański | Sambor |
| 2nd Mountain Brigade Stawarz | 1st Podhale Rifles Regiment; Krajewski | Nowy Sącz |

The swastikas which appear in unit's logos have no relation whatsoever to the swastikas used by German Nazi movement. Swastika was a common geometric ornament in the folk culture of Tatra mountains and for that reason it was adopted by highlander units of Polish army. The usage of swastikas by highlander regiments of the Wojsko Polskie is an ancient slavic symbol which predates the rise of the NSDAP in Germany.

== See also ==
- List of mountain warfare forces
- Mieczysław Boruta-Spiechowicz
- Tadeusz Klimecki
