= Hunger March in Sanok =

Demonstration of unemployed workers in Sanok, Poland

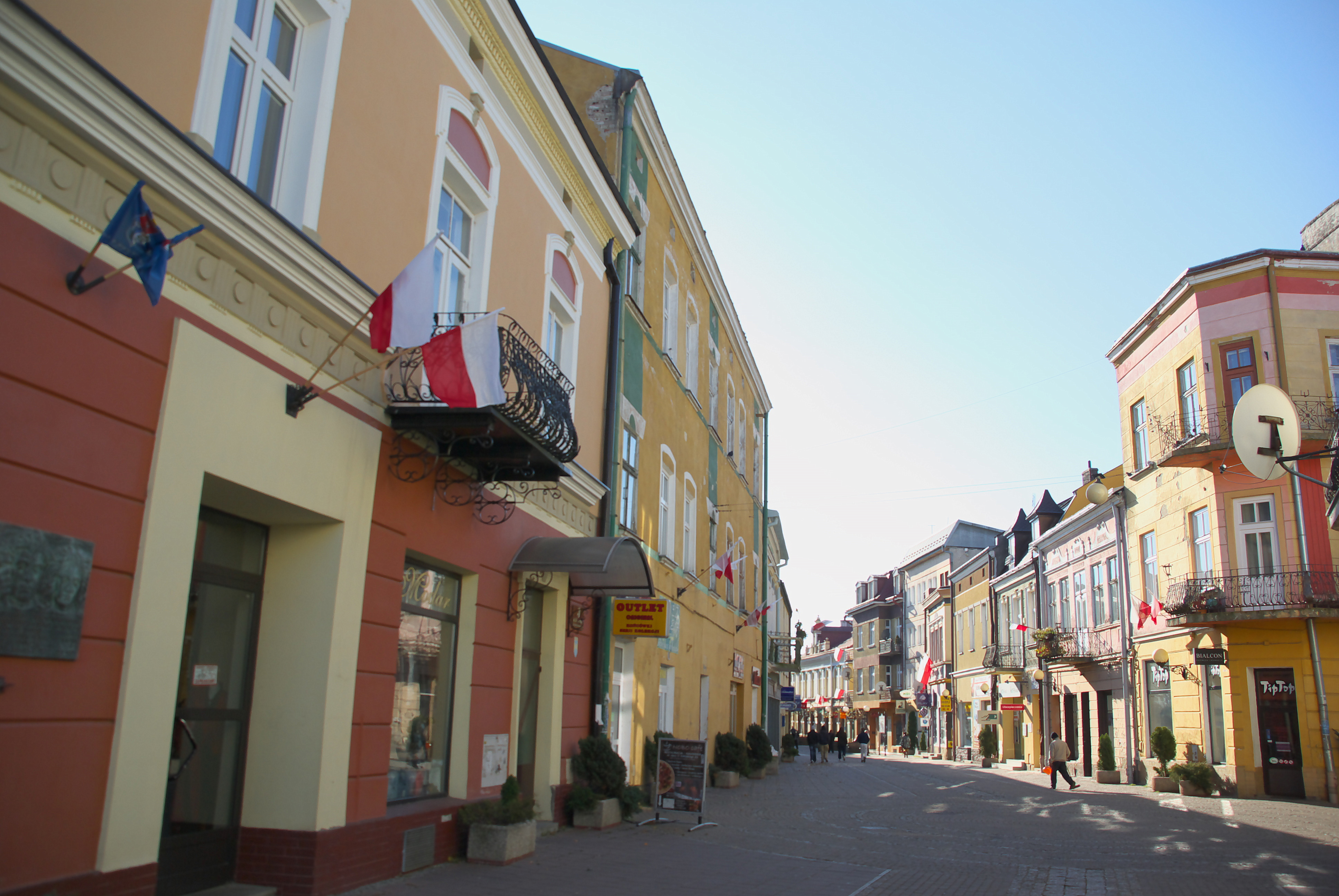
3 Maja Street – site of the march's suppression

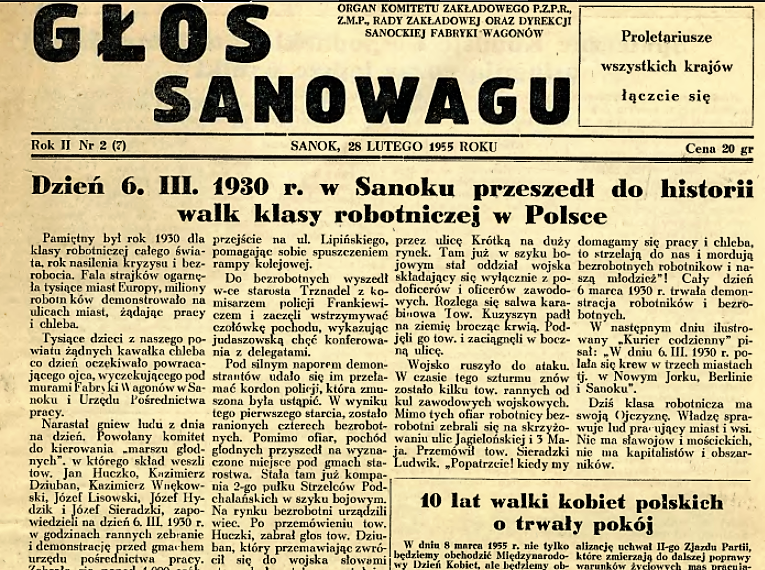
Anniversary mention in a Polish People's Republic era newspaper from 1955

The Hunger March in Sanok was a collective protest by unemployed workers in Sanok, Poland, on 6 March 1930, during the Great Depression.

== Events ==
The demonstration was triggered by widespread unemployment, the authorities' refusal to negotiate with the unemployed, unmet demands, and layoffs at the Wagon Factory. From a peak of 2,000 workers, the factory's workforce had dwindled to 600 by 1930. These layoffs fueled unrest at the factory. Activists from the Communist Party of Western Ukraine organized protests until 18 February 1930. In early March, an unemployed workers' committee was formed, including Communist Party of Western Ukraine's local secretary Kazimierz Wnękowski, Jan Huczko, Kazimierz Dziuban, Józef Lisowski, Józef Hydzik, and Józef Sieradzki. Organizers included Michał Bochorski.

On 5 March, a delegation presented demands (financial aid, food, fuel) to county starosta Romuald Klimowiecki, who initially refused but promised support after heated protests. The demonstrators, initially 400 strong at a rally in Sanok's Market Square outside the starostwo, were dispersed by police. They then marched to the factory directorate, demanding jobs, but were rebuffed. Incited by communist activists, including Wnękowski's speech, the crowd, now around 1,000, moved back toward the market square via Kazimierz Lipiński Street, where they were halted by State Police at a railway ramp. Efforts by deputy starosta Józef Trznadel and police commissioner Frankiewicz to stop the march failed, and the crowd broke through the police cordon.

At the Market Square, a rally was held with an improvised tribune at a well, where Huczko and Dziuban spoke. A company from the local 2nd Podhale Rifles Regiment was deployed to the starostwo. After the rally, the unemployed returned to the factory but, denied entry, forced their way into the production area. At Huczko's call, approximately 2,500 factory workers joined the march to the city center, proceeding along Jagiellońska Street and 3 Maja Street, where they were stopped at the intersection with Franciszkańska Street and the then Józef Piłsudski Street. Reports suggest shots were fired from the crowd with a revolver, prompting gunfire from the suppressing forces. Clashes ensued with police and the 2nd Podhale Rifles Regiment, which dispersed the demonstration. Police gunfire wounded several protesters, with clashes lasting about eight hours across nearby streets.

Estimates of injured protesters range from 4 to over 20 (or 18), with several police officers also hurt. Post-suppression, police arrested 150 workers, and leaders faced prison sentences, with Jan Huczko receiving 2.5 years and others from 2 weeks to 6 months. Participant estimates vary from 1,500 to as many as 3,000. Notable participants included Jakub Kolano and Jan Żołnierczyk.

The event was reported by Polish and international media. Ilustrowany Kuryer Codzienny wrote: "On 6 March 1930, blood was shed in three cities: New York, Berlin, and Sanok".

Starosta Romuald Klimowiecki was widely blamed for the gunfire, not only by worker-communist circles but also by the nationalist movement.

== Commemoration ==
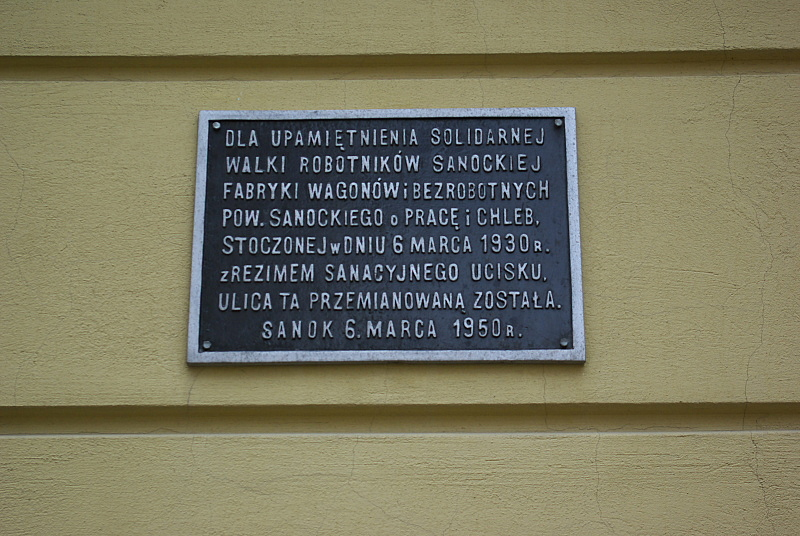
Commemorative plaque on the tenement at 2 Józef Piłsudski Street

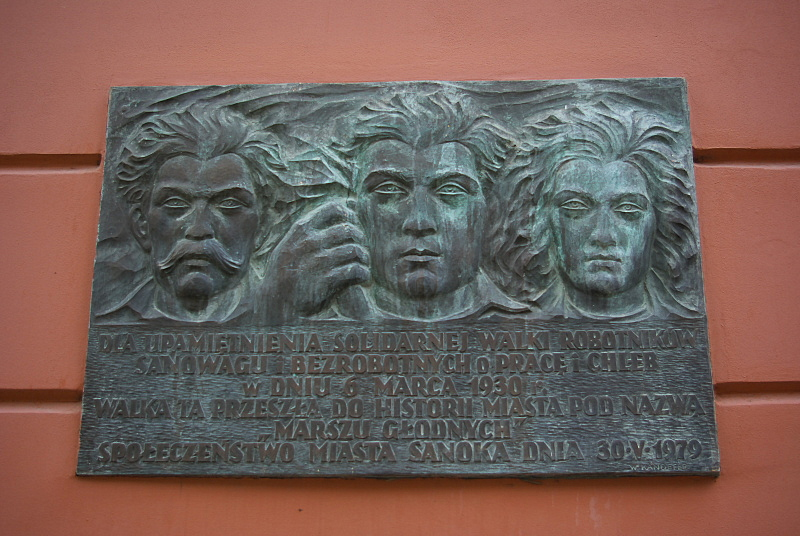
Commemorative plaque on the tenement at 3 3 Maja Street

During the Polish People's Republic, Sanok held anniversary commemorations of the Hunger March. On 6 March 1950, the 20th anniversary, the County National Council renamed Józef Piłsudski Street to 6 Marca Street.

The event is commemorated by two plaques on tenements facing each other at the march's site:

- A plaque unveiled on 5 March 1950 by Mayor Józef Dąbrowski, located at 2 Józef Piłsudski Street (then 6 Marca Street). Its inscription reads: "To commemorate the united struggle of the Sanok Wagon Factory workers and the unemployed of Sanok County for work and bread, fought on 6 March 1930 against the sanacja regime's oppression, this street has been renamed. Sanok, 6 March 1950".
- A plaque unveiled on 30 May 1979 at the tenement at then 3 22 Lipca Street (now 3 3 Maja Street), with the inscription: "To commemorate the united struggle of Sanowag workers and the unemployed for work and bread on 6 March 1930. This struggle entered the city's history as the 'Hunger March'. Sanok community, 30 May 1979". Designed and crafted by Władysław Kandefer, it was unveiled by First Secretary Wiesław Skałkowski. Roman Tarkowski was initially tasked with designing and crafting it in the late 1970s but abandoned the project.
- Henryk Szarek, a member of the Workers' Association of Cultural Creators at Autosan, created a sculpture titled Hunger March, presented in 1988 to three march participants.

Writer Kalman Segal referenced the Hunger March in his 1955 novel Nad dziwną rzeką Sambation, published in 1957.

Since the 1990s, leftist activists (initially Social Democracy of the Republic of Poland, later Democratic Left Alliance) have annually laid flowers and paid tribute at the 1979 plaque on 1 May.
