= 22nd Mountain Infantry Division =

WW2 Polish Army unit

- The Highlander Cross badge worn on the collars of the Podhale Rifle Regiment
- Active: 1919-1944
- Country: Poland
- Branch: Land forces
- Type: Mountain infantry
- Role: Mountain warfare
- Size: ca. 16,000
- Garrison/HQ: Sanok, Przemyśl, Sambor
- Nickname: Podhalańczycy

Commanders
- Notable commanders: Leopold Engel-Ragis

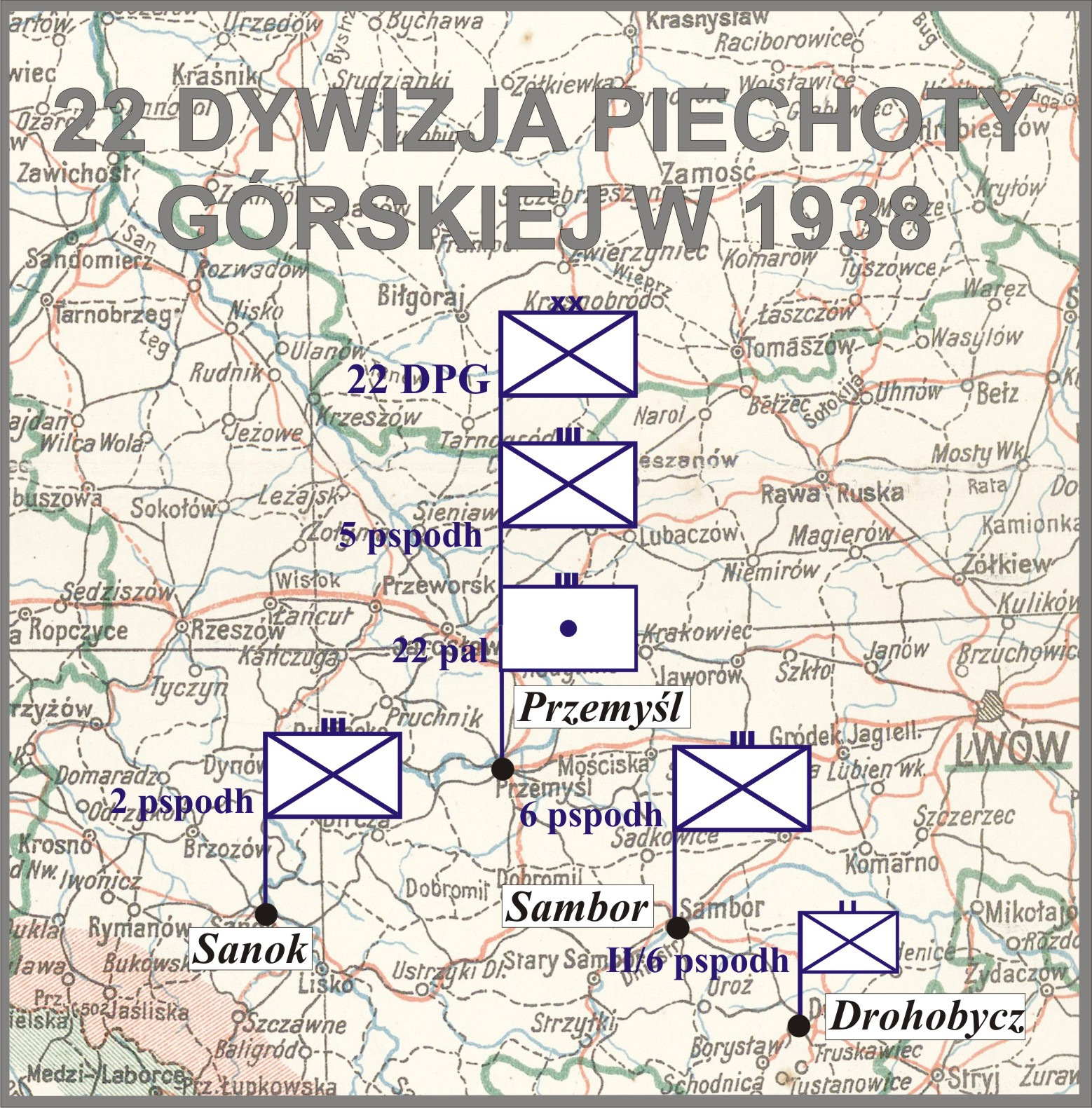
22 DP w 1938

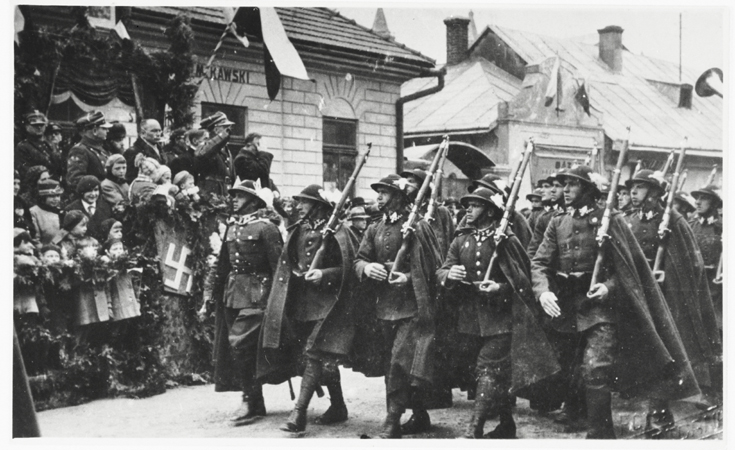
Soldiers of the Polish 2nd Podhale Rifle Regiment in full gala dress-suit, Sanok, 1936

The 22nd Mountain Infantry Division (Polish: 22 Dywizja Piechoty Górskiej, 22 DPG) was a pre-war unit of the Polish Army. It was one of two mountain infantry divisions of Poland to fight against the Invasion of Poland of 1939. Currently its traditions are continued by the 21st Podhale Rifle Brigade. Until 1939 the unit was commanded by Col. Leopold Engel-Ragis and was stationed in and around the towns of Sanok, Przemyśl and Sambor.

Along with 11th Infantry and 21st Mountain Infantry Divisions, the 22nd was notable for its distinctive uniforms, based on folk attire of the Górale (Polish highlanders) rather than standard uniforms of the Polish Army. During the Invasion of Poland, the division was attached to the Prusy Army. Overrun by the Germans, the Regiments fought separately in the ranks of other units.

== OOB ==
Regiment	Sub-unit	Notes	
22nd Mountain Infantry Division Engel-Ragis
22nd Mountain Infantry Division Engel-Ragis	2nd Podhale Rifle Regiment; Szlaszewski		Sanok
22nd Mountain Infantry Division Engel-Ragis	5th Podhale Rifle Regiment; Żółkiewski		Przemyśl
22nd Mountain Infantry Division Engel-Ragis	6th Podhale Rifle Regiment; Dobrzański		Sambor
22nd Mountain Infantry Division Engel-Ragis	22nd Light Artillery Regiment; Surman		
22nd Mountain Infantry Division Engel-Ragis	22nd Battalion of Heavy Artillery; Krzyżyński		
22nd Battalion of Engineers Morek			
22nd Motorized AA Artillery Battery Makarczyk		4 x 40 mm wz.37 Bofors AA guns	
squadron of organic cavalry Jakóbiak			
Smaller units	Staff company, taczanka HMG company, signals company, bicycle company		

== See also ==
- Podhale rifles
- Mieczysław Boruta-Spiechowicz
- Polish army order of battle in 1939
- Polish contribution to WWII
- List of Polish divisions in World War II
