= 5th Podhale Rifles Infantry Regiment =

Unit of the Polish Army

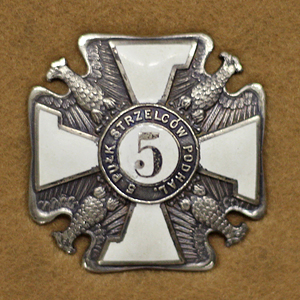
- Active: 1 October 1921 – 10 September 1939
- Country: Poland
- Role: Infantry
- Engagements: Polish-Soviet War: Battle of Radzymin; World War II: Invasion of Poland

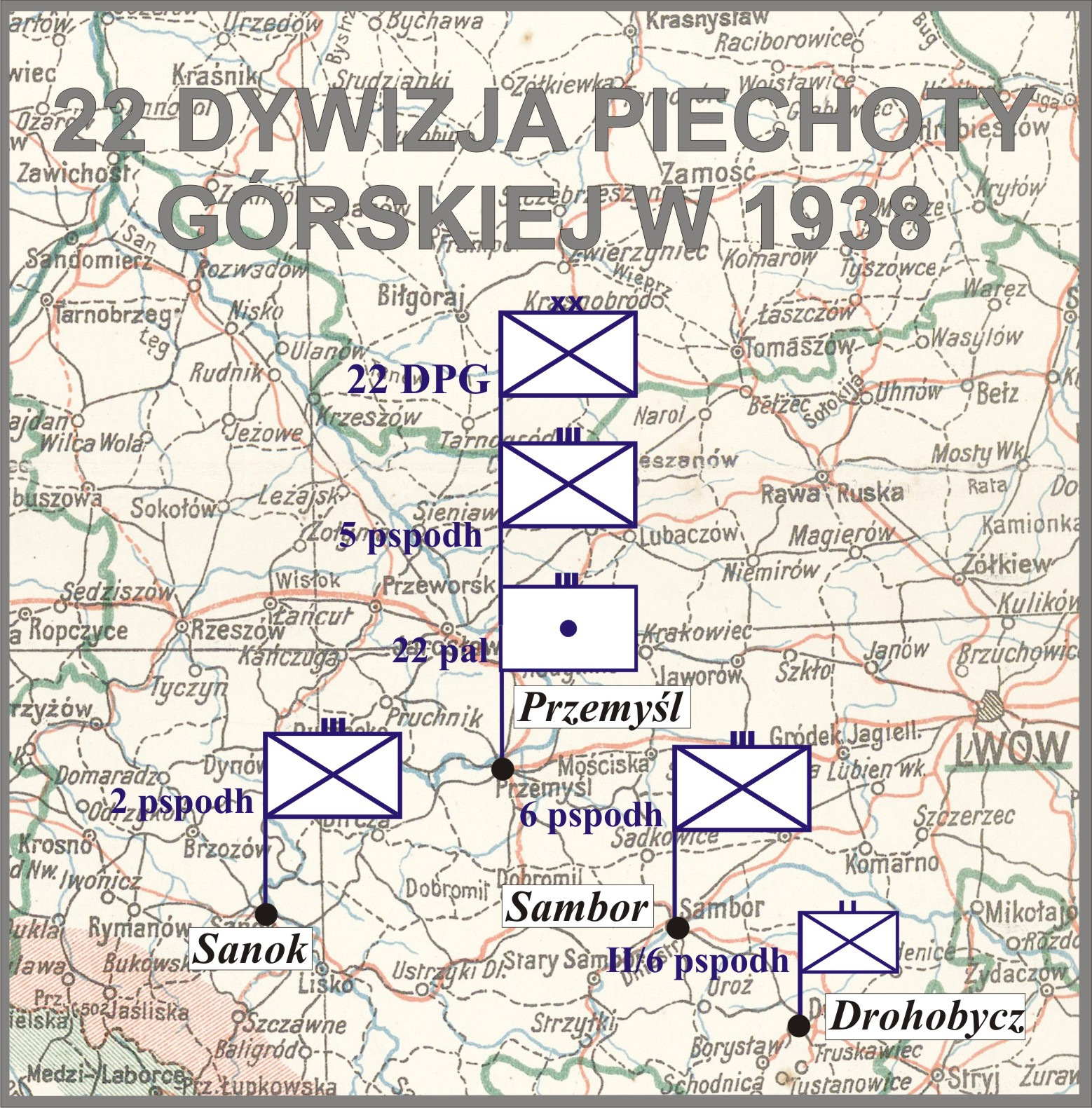

The 46th Infantry Regiment (Polish: 46 Pułk Strzelców Kresowych, 4e Régiment de Chasseurs PolonaisFrench: 4e Régiment d'Infanterie Polonaise), later the 5th Podhale Rifles Infantry Regiment (Polish: 5 Pułk Strzelców Podhalańskich) was a military unit of the Polish Army active during the Polish–Soviet War (1919–1921.

Initially formed in France as part of General Józef Haller's Blue Army as part of Gen. Józef Haller's Blue Army, it received the name of the 4th Polish Rifles Regiment. It arrived in Poland in May 1919 and was integrated into the rest of the Polish Army under a new name and number (46th Infantry Regiment).

It took part in many battles of the Polish-Bolshevik War, notably the Battle of Radzymin, where its 1st battalion broke under enemy fire, allowing the Soviets to capture the strategically important town and triggering a three-day battle for Radzymin. After the war, in October 1921 it was reformed into the 5th Podhale Rifles Infantry Regiment, part of the Podhale Rifles mountain infantry units.

During the 1939 German invasion of Poland it formed part of the 22nd Mountain Infantry Division. It was commanded by Lieutenant Colonel Mieczysław Dobrzański and initially posted to Przemyśl. The original regiment was in no way related to the 46th Infantry Regiment of the Polish People's Army formed in Gliwice in 1945 as part of the 13th Infantry Division.
