= Public vocational universities in Poland =

Type of vocational school in Poland

Public vocational universities in Poland, also known as State Higher Vocational Schools (Polish: Państwowe Wyższe Szkoły Zawodowe) are a type of vocational university in Poland.

They operate on the basis of the provisions of the Act of July 20, 2018 - Law on Higher Education and Science, providing education that takes into account the needs of the socio-economic environment and not being academic universities. Vocational universities provide only practical studies.

Between 1998 and 2009, 36 public vocational universities were established. Between 2016 and 2020, three of them were abolished by incorporation into universities. As of December 31, 2020, a total of 51,751 people studied at 33 public vocational universities, which constituted 4.25% of all students and 6.08% of students of public universities.

From September 2021, a public vocational university, after meeting certain conditions, may use the name "academy of applied sciences".
