= Józef Kustroń =

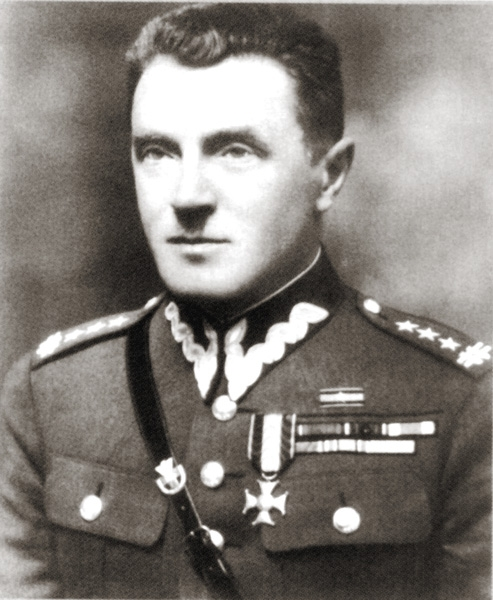
Kustroń prior to 1939

Józef Rudolf Kustroń (16 October 1892 – 16 September 1939) was a brigadier general of the Polish Army in the Second Polish Republic, commandant of the 21st Mountain Infantry Division. He was the first Polish general to die during the German invasion of Poland, and the second general officer casualty of the campaign overall; the first was Wilhelm Fritz von Roettig.

== Early life ==
Kustroń was born on 16 October 1892 in Stryj. He spent his childhood in the southern town of Nowy Sącz, where his family had settled. In high school, he was an active member of youth organizations fighting for Poland's independence (see Partitions of Poland), such as the ZET Youth Association. In 1910 he began studying law and philosophy at the Jagiellonian University in Kraków, and two years later joined the paramilitary Riflemen's Association. After the outbreak of World War I, Kustron joined the Polish Legions, and was promoted to platoon commander in the Second Infantry Regiment of the Legions. On 29 October 1914 he was wounded during the Battle of Molotkowo and, after recuperating, was promoted to porucznik (lieutenant). Transferred to the 4th Infantry Regiment, he fought against the Russians in the area of Lublin, and in Volhynia, and was promoted to captain. After the Oath crisis, Kustron was demoted by the Austrians, and moved to an infantry regiment of the Austro-Hungarian Army. From 1917, he was an active member of the Polish Military Organisation, and in late autumn of 1918, he participated in the disarmament of Austrian troops in Kraków.

After Poland regained independence in late 1918, Kustroń worked for the Ministry of Military Affairs. During the Polish-Soviet War, he oversaw military rail transportation from July 1920 and, three years later, he was awarded the Virtuti Militari order.

== Between the wars ==
In the inter-war period, Kustroń served in several infantry units. He was deputy of the 42nd Infantry Regiment in Białystok, then commander of the 55th Infantry Regiment in Leszno. During the May Coup, he supported Józef Piłsudski, and prevented his regiment from going to Warsaw to fight for the lawful president. In the late 1930s, he commanded the Pomeranian 16th Infantry Division from Grudziądz and, in 1935, he was appointed commander of the 21st Mountain Infantry Division from Bielsko-Biała. With this unit, he took part in the annexation of Trans-Olza (Český Těšín) in 1938 (see Independent Operational Group Silesia) and was promoted to brigadier general in March 1939.

== Second World War ==
During the Polish September Campaign, Kustroń's division was part of the Kraków Army, and was engaged in heavy fighting with the advancing Wehrmacht from the first day of the war. After several battles and skirmishes, the division, retreating east, found itself near the town of Oleszyce on 16 September. Trying to break through German lines and reach Lwów, the Poles fought a battle with Wehrmacht's 45th Infantry Division. Kustroń was killed at around 2 p.m in Ułazów. He was buried on the battlefield, and in 1953, his remains were moved to Nowy Sącz. He was the first Polish general to die in the invasion, and the second general officer casualty of the campaign overall; the first was Wilhelm Fritz von Roettig.

== Honours and awards ==
- Knight's Cross of the Virtuti Militari, previously awarded the Gold Cross and the Silver Cross
- Officer's Cross of the Order of Polonia Restituta
- Cross of Independence
- Cross of Valour – three times
- Gold Cross of Merit – twice
- Commemorative Medal for War 1918–1921
- Regained Independence Medal of the Decade
- Commander's Cross with Star of the Order of the Crown of Romania
- Order of the White Eagle (Poland)
