= 21st Mountain Infantry Division (Poland) =

- The Highlander Cross badge worn on the collars of the Podhale Rifles Regiments
- Active: 1919-1944
- Country: Poland
- Branch: Land forces
- Type: Mountain infantry
- Role: Mountain warfare
- Size: ca. 16,000
- Garrison/HQ: Nowy Sącz, Bielsko, Cieszyn, Bogumin, Kraków
- Nickname: Podhalańczycy

Commanders
- Notable commanders: Józef Kustroń

The 21st Mountain Infantry Division (Polish: 21 Dywizja Piechoty Górskiej, 21 DPG) was a pre-war unit of the Polish Army. It was one of two mountain infantry divisions of Poland to take part in the Invasion of Poland of 1939. Currently its traditions are continued by Polish 21st Podhale Rifles Brigade. Until 1939 the unit was commanded by Gen.bryg. Józef Kustroń and was stationed in and around the towns of Nowy Sącz, Bielsko, Cieszyn, Bogumin, Kraków.

Along with 11th Infantry and 22nd Mountain Infantry Divisions, the 21st was notable for its distinctive uniforms, based on folk attire of the Gorals (Polish highlanders) rather than standard uniforms of the Polish Army. During the Invasion of Poland, the division was attached to Bielsko Operational Group of the Kraków Army. It defended the line of Cieszyn-Bogumin in the region of Trans-Olza. Following the steady withdrawal eastwards, it was victorious in the battles of Krzywoczka and Mogilany along the Dunajec. Attacked on September 6 by superior forces of the German 2nd Panzer Division and German 4th Panzer Division, parts of its shielding forces managed to withdraw to the other side of the river, blowing the bridges in Bobrowniki up. At the same time, a major part of the division was assaulted prior to the river crossing and had to withdraw northwards, where it joined with the Polish 6th Infantry Division near the town of Biskupice.

Finally, the division managed to escape from German forces and cross the San river overnight of September 12 near Jarosław. Between September 13 and September 16 the division took part in heavy fights of Gen. Boruta-Spiechowicz's operational group in the vicinity of Oleszyce, Futorów, Cewków and Ułazów. There the division, by then reduced to merely 4,000 soldiers, managed to withstand a three days long assault of German 45th and 28th Infantry Divisions. However, on September 16 the remnants of the 21st Mountain Division were finally surrounded and most of them either capitulated or were disbanded by their commanders. The division's commanding officer, Józef Kustroń, was killed on the battlefield while personally leading his soldiers in an assault.

== See also ==
- Polish army order of battle in 1939
- Polish contribution to World War II
- List of Polish divisions in World War II
- Podhale rifles
