= Stefan Szlaszewski =

Polish army commander (1892–1959)

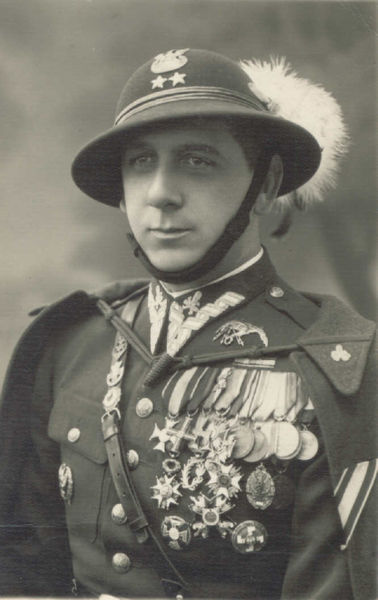
Szlaszewski in a distinctive uniform of the Podhale Rifles; 1930's, still in the rank of Lt.Col.

Stefan Szlaszewski (25 May 1892 – 1959) was a Polish military officer and a notable commander of mountain troops of the Polish Army in the period preceding World War II. Serving at the rank of Colonel, he was the commanding officer of the Polish 2nd Podhale Rifles Regiment in Sanok, a prestigious unit of the Podhale Rifles attached to the 22nd Division. For his part in the battles of Kraków and Kielce during the Invasion of Poland he was awarded the Silver Cross of the Virtuti Militari, the highest Polish military award. For his part in the Polish-Bolshevik War and the remainder of World War II he also received a number of other decorations, both Polish and foreign. Among them was the Cross of Independence and the French Chevalier of the Legion of Honour.
