= Samuel Ludwik Zasadius =

Polish writer, pastor, translator

- Born: 1695; Komorzno, Habsburg Silesia
- Died: 25 March 1756 (aged 60–61); Tarnowskie Góry, Prussian Silesia
- Education: University of Jena
- Occupations: Religious writer Pastor
- Writing career
- Language: Polish
- Genre: Non-fiction
- Subject: Religion

Samuel Ludwik Zasadius or Zasadyus, Sassadius (c. 1695–1756) was a Polish religious writer, pastor and author of popular sermons and prayer-books. He was also known for propagating Polishness in Cieszyn Silesia.

== Biography ==
Zasadius was born c. 1695 in Komorzno as the son of a Polish pastor. He studied in Wittenberg and Jena. In the years of 1721–1730 Zasadius was a deacon and preacher of Jesus Church in Cieszyn.

He led educational activity, published Polish magazines and learned the Polish language. In 1730 he was expelled (with pastors Johann Adam Steinmetz and Jan Muthmann) from the Austrian monarchy for being in favour of the Pietism movement. He stayed in Germany until 1742. After returning, he became a pastor in Tarnowskie Góry where he died on 25 March 1756.

== Works ==
Zasadius is an author of popular prayer-books and song-books, such as Mleczna potrawa duchowa... (1726), catechism Droga do nieba... (1723), collection of orations Kazania pokutne (1730, online). He translated a New Testament (1725), The Small Catechism by Martin Luther (1727) and other Luther works.
