= Komorzno =

- Village
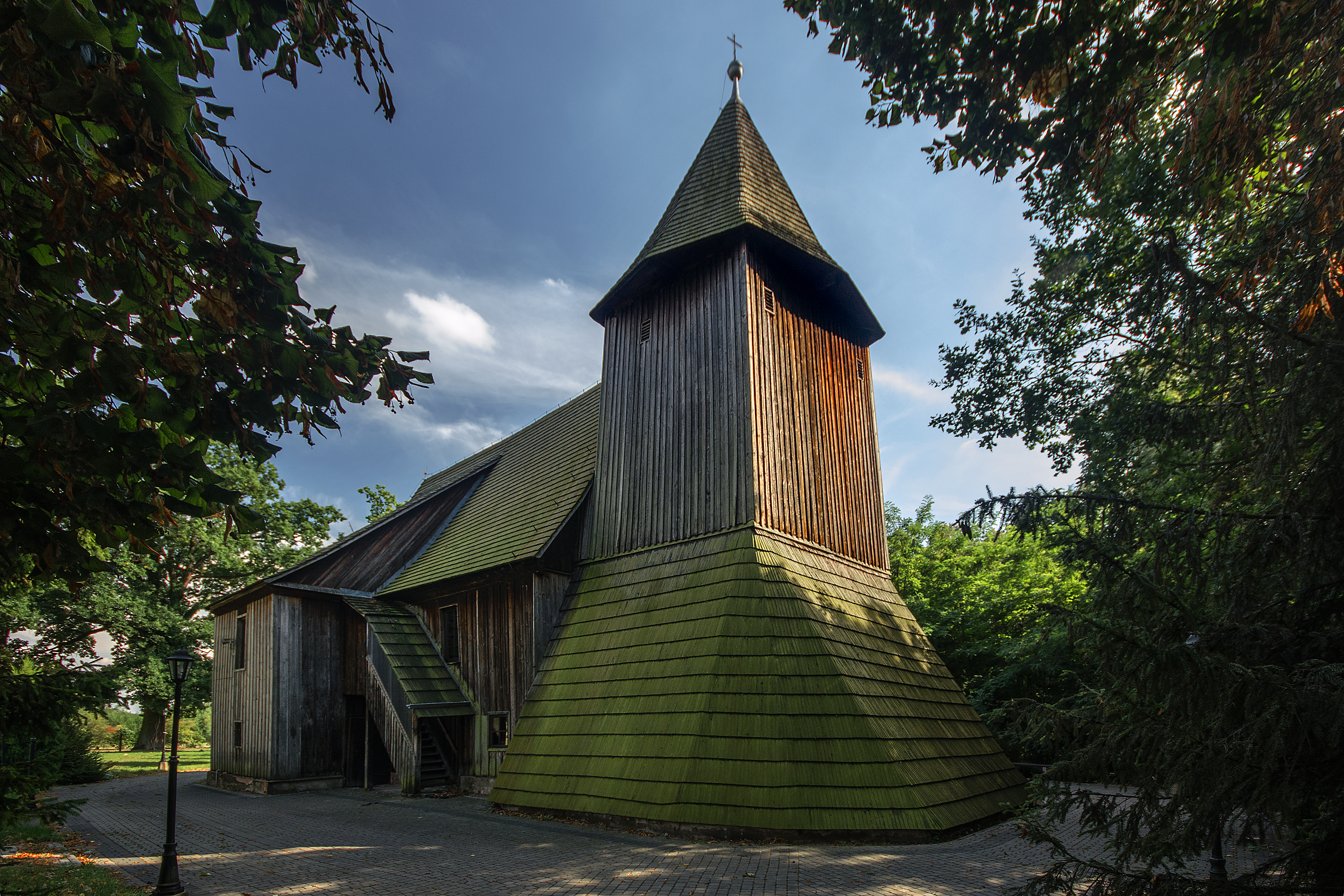
- Church of Saint Hedwig

- Location within Poland
- Coordinates: 51°7′N 18°4′E
- Country: Poland
- Voivodeship: Opole
- County: Kluczbork
- Gmina: Wołczyn
- Time zone: UTC+1 (CET)
  - Summer (DST): UTC+2 (CEST)
- Postal code: 46-264
- Area code: +48 77
- Vehicle registration: OKL
- Website: http://www.komorzno.info/

Komorzno [kɔˈmɔʐnɔ] is a village in the administrative district of Gmina Wołczyn, within Kluczbork County, Opole Voivodeship, in south-western Poland.

The name of the village is derived from the old Polish word komor, meaning "mosquito".

Komorzno's heritage monuments are the church of Saint Hedwig, the old park and preserved old village houses.

== Notable people ==
- Jerzy Bock (1621–1690), Polish religious writer, poet, translator
- Adam Kotowski (1626–1693), Polish official, royal secretary
- Samuel Ludwik Zasadius (c. 1695–1756), Polish religious writer, pastor, author of popular sermons and prayer-books
- Andrzej Sokołowski (born 1948), former Polish handball player, 1976 Summer Olympics bronze medalist
