= Tarnowskie Góry =

City in Silesian Voivodeship, Poland

Tarnowskie Góry Tarnowske Gōry (Silesian)
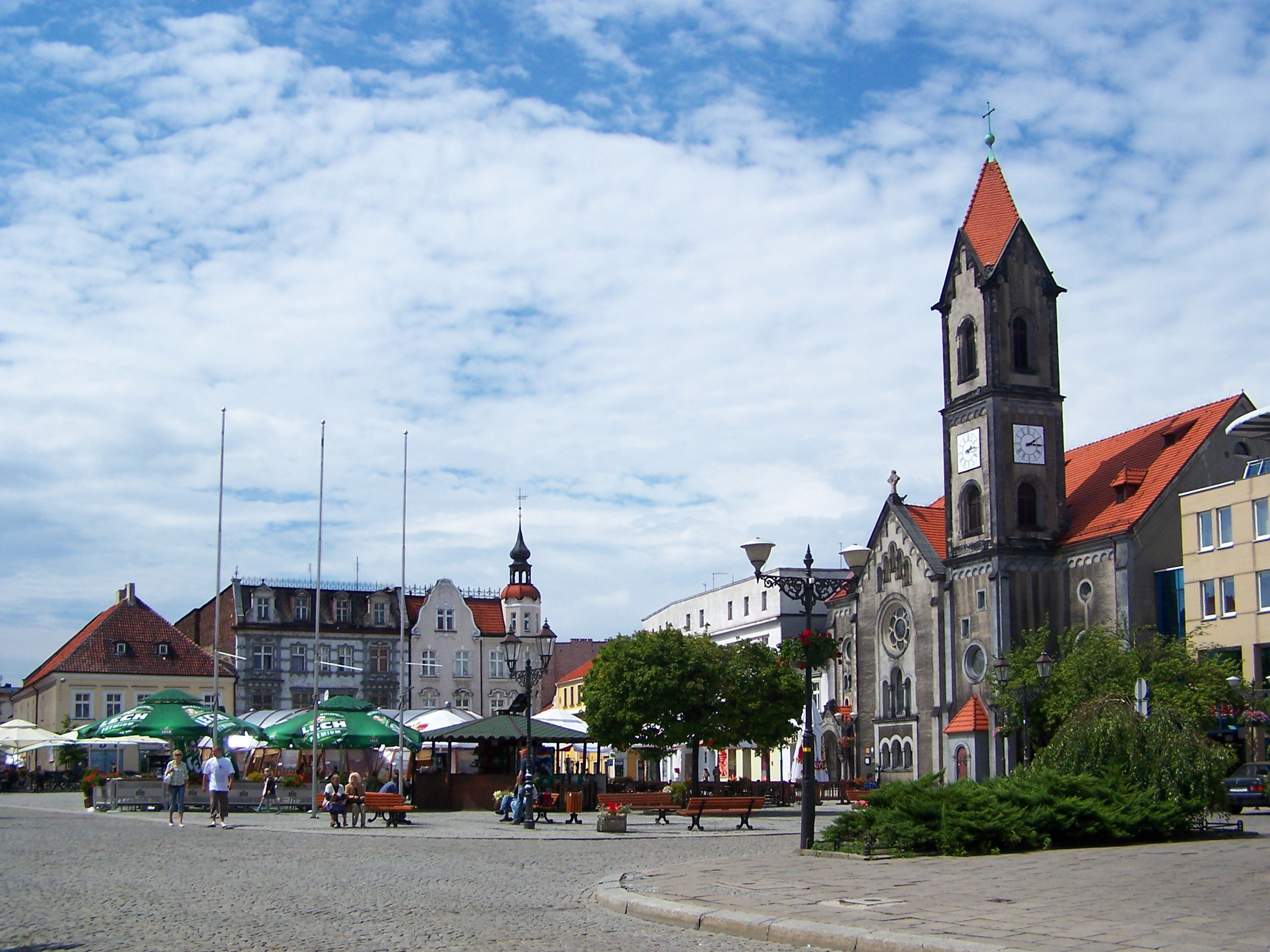
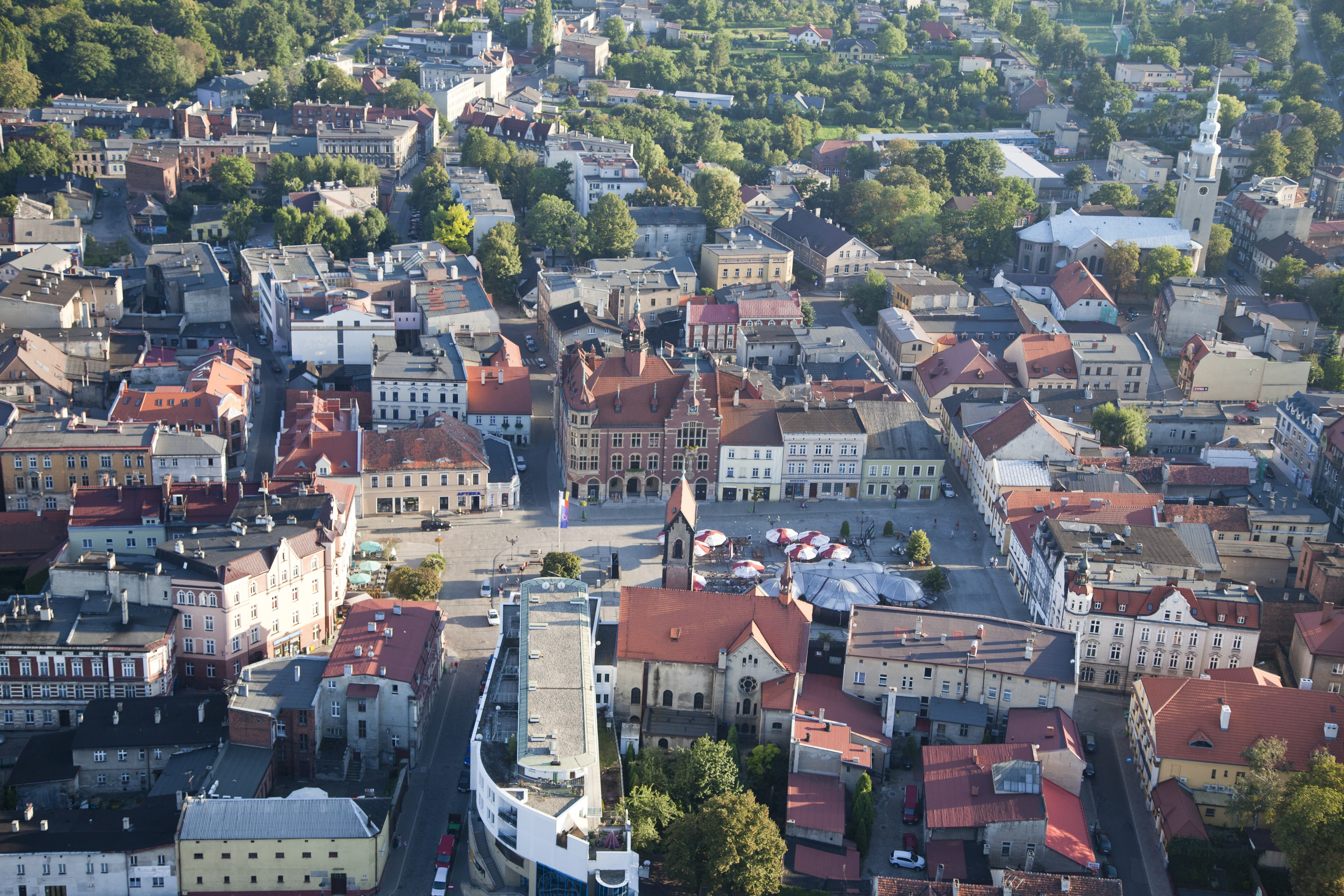
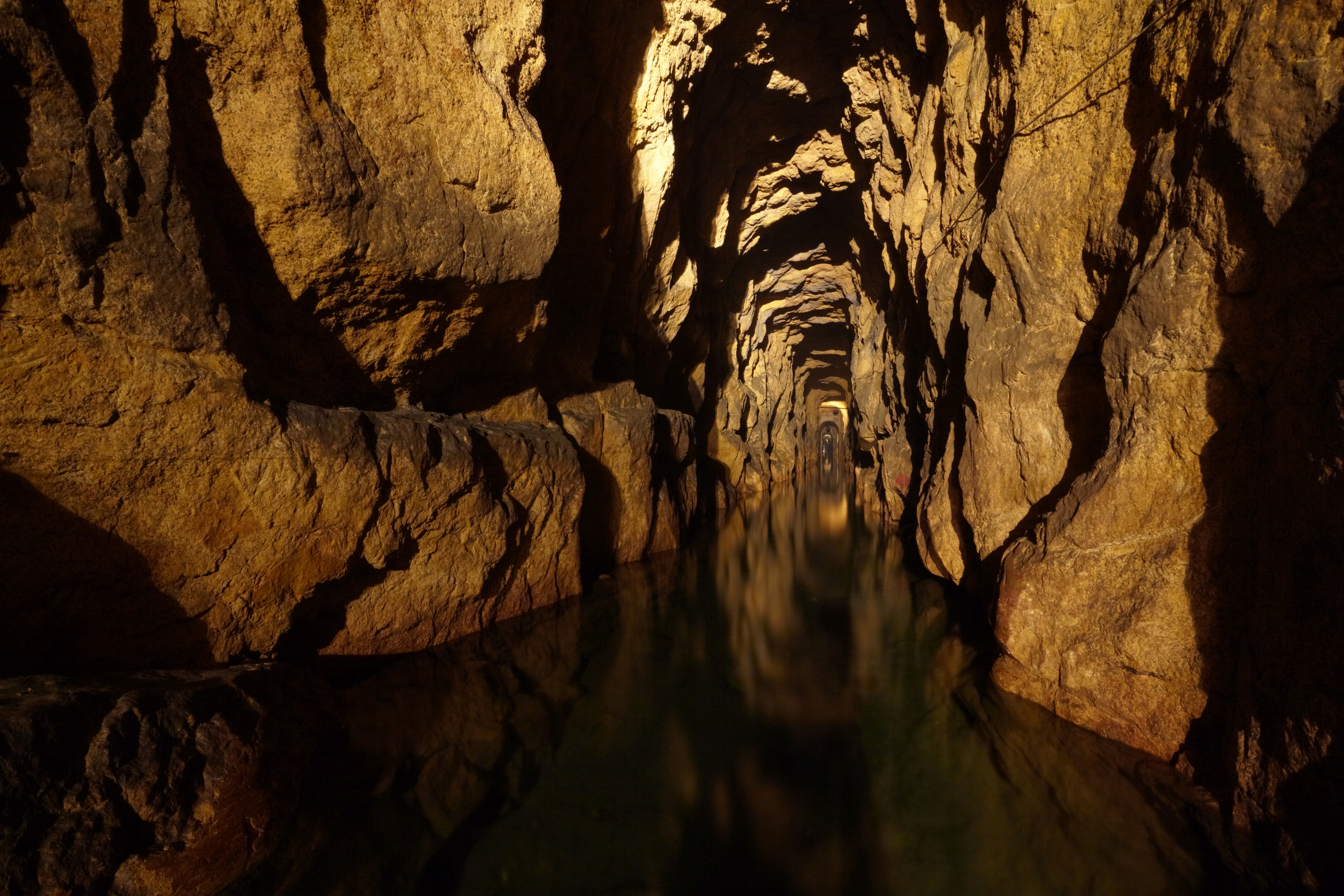
- From top, left to right: The Market Square (Rynek) with the Neo-Romanesque Protestant church on the right side; Bird's eye view of the town center; Historic Silver Mine

- Flag Coat of arms

- Location within Silesian Voivodeship Location within Poland
- Coordinates: 50°26′40″N 18°51′30″E
- Country: Poland
- Voivodeship: Silesian
- County: Tarnowskie Góry
- Gmina: Tarnowskie Góry (urban gmina)
- Town rights: 1526

Government
  - Mayor: Arkadiusz Czech

Area
  - Total: 83.72 km^{2} (32.32 sq mi)

Population (31 December 2021)
  - Total: 61,842 ▲
  - Density: 738.7/km^{2} (1,913/sq mi)
- Time zone: UTC+1 (CET)
  - Summer (DST): UTC+2 (CEST)
- Postal code: 42-600 to 42-609, 42-612 and 42-680
- Car plates: STA
- Primary airport: Katowice Airport
- Website: https://tarnowskiegory.pl

Tarnowskie Góry (Polish: [tarˈnɔfskjɛ ˈɡurɨ]; German: Tarnowitz; Silesian: Tarnowske Gōry) is a city in Silesia, southern Poland, located in the Silesian Highlands near Katowice and seat city of Tarnowskie Góry County Located in the north of the Metropolis GZM, a megalopolis, the greater Katowice-Ostrava metropolitan area populated by about 5,294,000 people. The population of the town is 61,842 (2021) making it one of the biggest towns in Poland. As of 1999, it is part of Silesian Voivodeship, previously Katowice Voivodeship.

The Historic Silver Mine of Tarnowskie Góry, a UNESCO World Heritage Site is located in the town.

== Names and etymology ==
The name of Tarnowskie Góry is derived from Tarnowice, the name of a local village, and góry which in Old Polish meant "mines". In a Prussian document from 1750 (published in the Polish language in Berlin by Frederick the Great [1712–1786]), the town is mentioned, among other Silesian towns, as "Tarnowskie Góry". The German name Tarnowitz was introduced in the late 18th century, after the Third Silesian War (between Austria and Prussia). As a result of the Germanization of the area, all Polish names received German equivalents (usually closely resembling the original, like Kattowitz for Katowice).

== History ==
=== Medieval and Renaissance ===
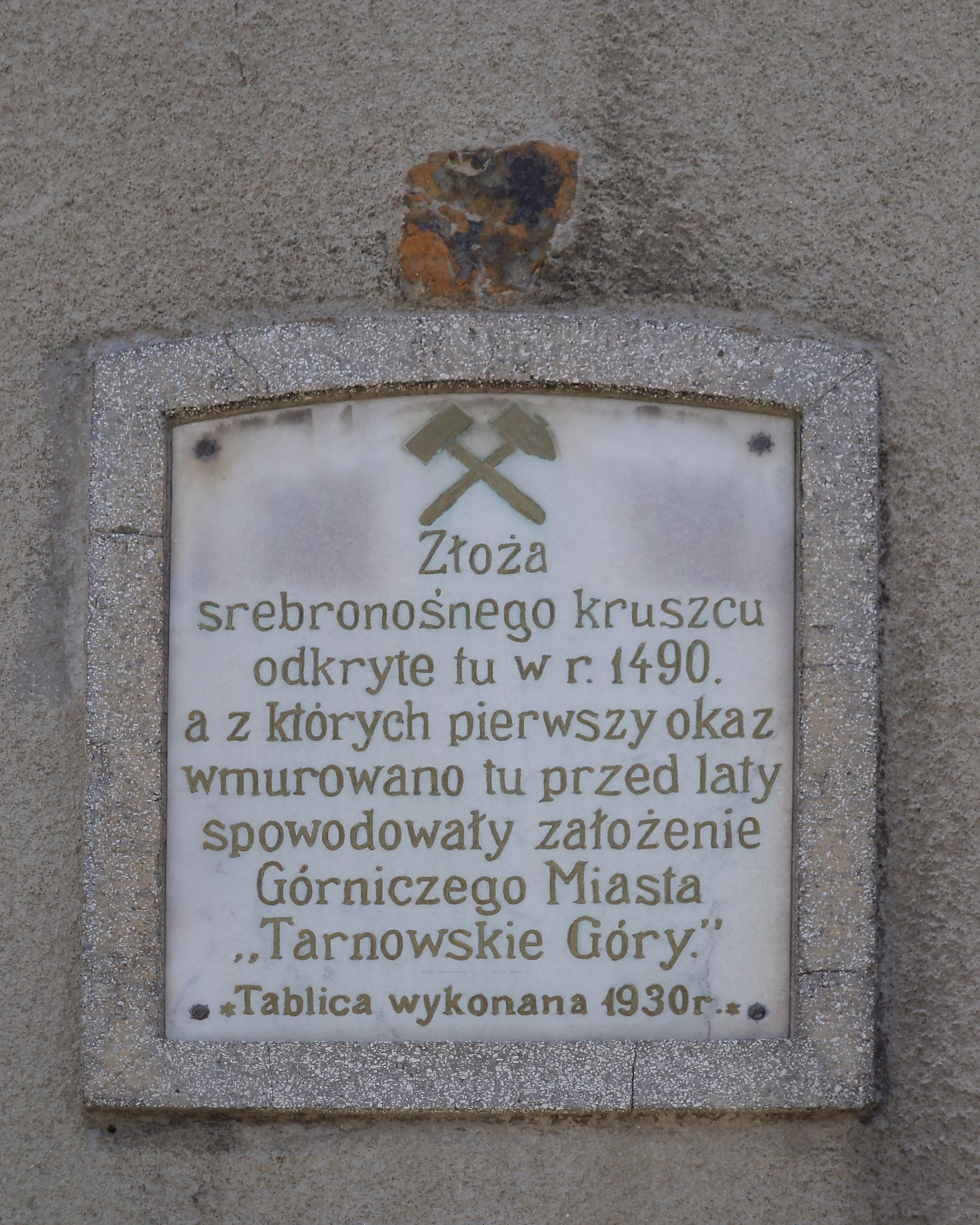
A 1930 plaque commemorating the alleged discovery of the silver deposit in 1490 in the place of the current Florczak House at the Market Square

In the Middle Ages the region was inhabited by Lechitic Polish tribes, and in the 10th century it became part of the emerging Polish state under its first ruler Mieszko I of Poland. Repty Śląskie, a village, now within Tarnowskie Góry's town limits, was mentioned in an official papal document dating from September 12, 1201. The present-day district of Stare Tarnowice was the location of a motte-and-bailey castle from the 14th century, which is now an archaeological site.

=== Enlightenment ===
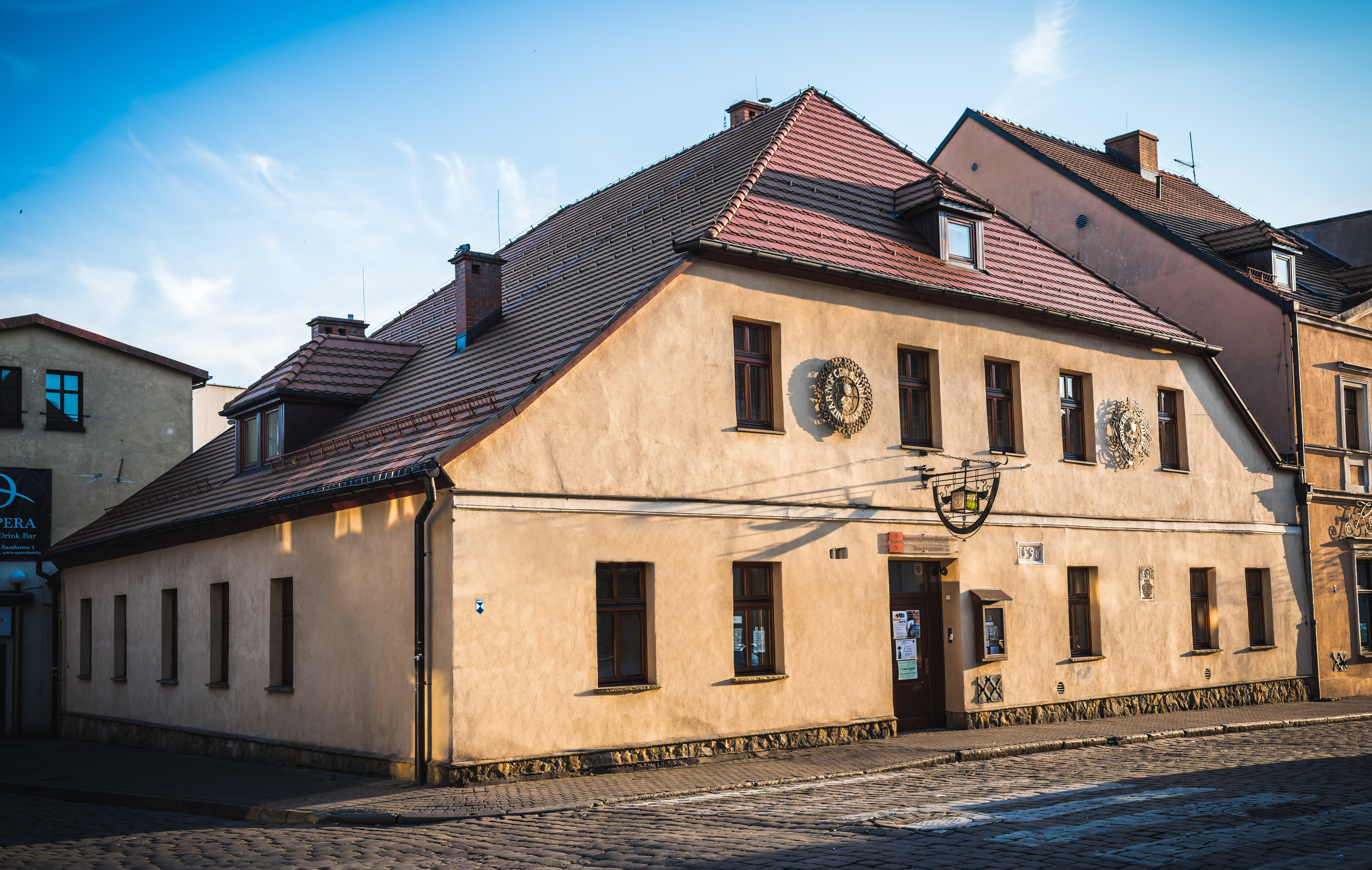
16th-century Gwarek House, in which in 1744 the first Lutheran service was held after the end of Habsburg rule, as mentioned by pastor Samuel Ludwik Zasadius

The prosperity of Tarnowskie Góry was abruptly halted by the Thirty Year War (1618–1648), and in 1676–77 its population was farther decimated by an outbreak of plague (which two years later reached the Austrian capital). In 1683, Polish King John III Sobieski rested in town on his way to the Battle of Vienna (where he led the famous Hussars branch of Polish cavalry to victory in defeating the Ottoman army and stopping the progress of their European invasion). In Tarnowskie Góry, Polish nobility welcomed the newly elected kings Augustus II the Strong and Augustus III of Poland, in July 1697 and January 1734, respectively, when they were heading for their royal coronations to Kraków.

December 16, 1740, was marked by the Prussian army entering the town during the first of the Silesian Wars; in 1742, Austrian domination ended and Tarnowskie Góry fell under Prussian rule. In 1742, after the end of Austrian rule, a Lutheran parish was established, whose first pastor was Polish religious writer and author of popular prayer-books Samuel Ludwik Zasadius. Around 1780 Friedrich Wilhelm von Reden opened a government-controlled mine as well as silver and lead foundry named "Frederyk" after Frederick William II, the king of Prussia.

Jews, with a few exceptions, were restricted or altogether banned from the area throughout the years; yet still they managed to have a great impact on the entire region's progress. Salomon Isaac, Jewish trade-agent and mining entrepreneur, was one of the greatest contributors to the development of the Sillesian metallurgical and mining industries and, ultimately, become one of the managing officers of the newly formed Prussian Office of Mining in Tarnowskie Góry.

=== Industrial Revolution ===
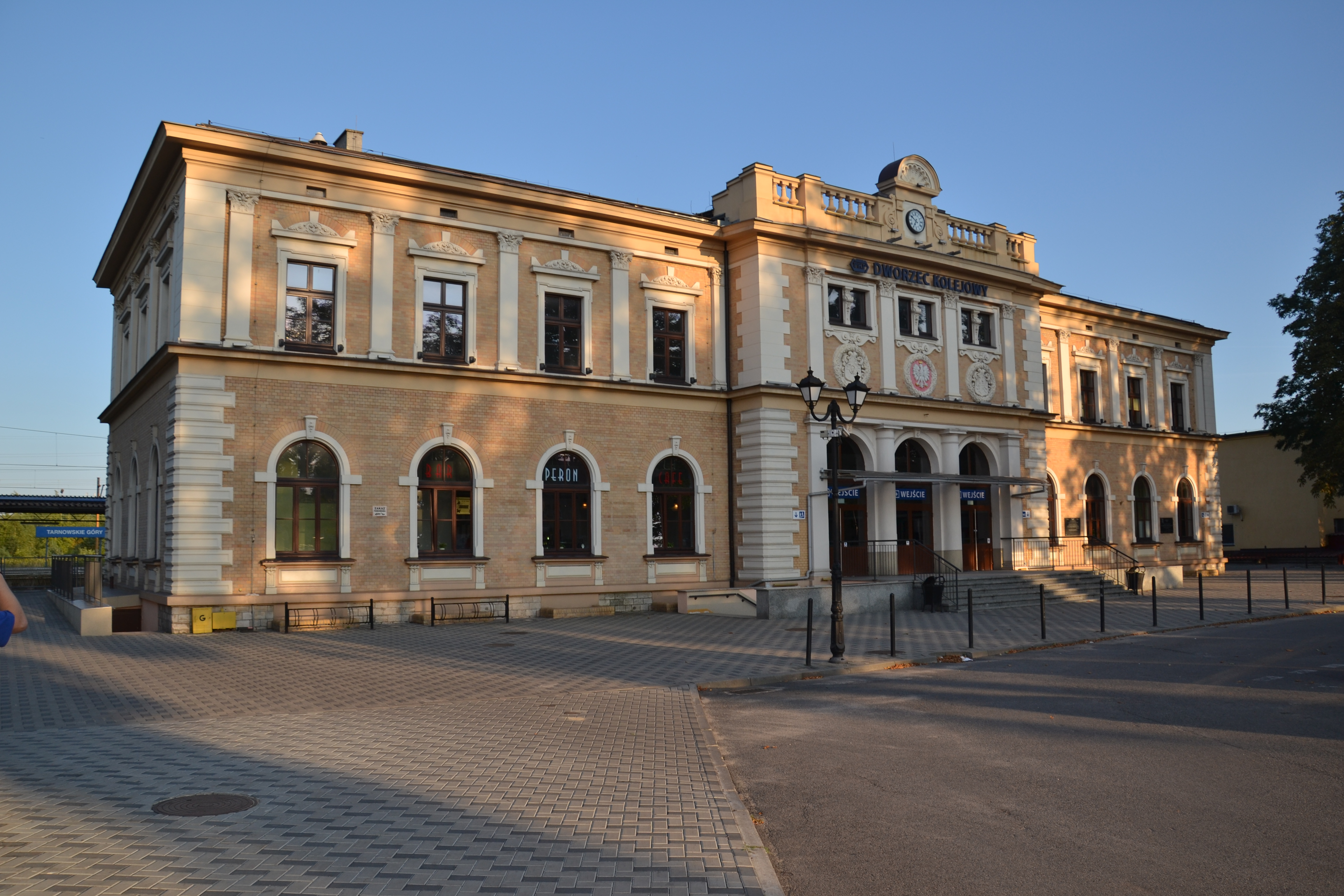
Railway station

In 1788, sparking the onset of the Industrial Revolution a Newcomen atmospheric engine was imported from Wales and installed with a purpose of draining the underground waters. Eventually eight steam engines were used, consuming many tonnes of coal. To replace them, miles of adits or drainage-tunnels were cut. A 600-metre part of former "Fryderyk" adit is a tourist route named Black Trout Adit. The tunnels were cut through a solid bedrock and one of the system outlets, near Repty, became the main contributory of river Drama.

Although Napoleonic Wars damaged and put a burden of heavy taxation on it, the town experienced another boom of growth and prosperity in the 19th century. In 1803 one of world's first schools of mining was initiated and, during following few decades, many new factories and businesses opened including: paper mill, iron foundry, printing shop, brewery, soap factory, a chemical plant and natural gas production plant. During that period, the town square and two main streets were paved, gas lighting illuminated the town and a sewage system was installed. "Górnośląska Spółka Bracka" (The Upper-Silesian Brotherhood Cooperative) was organized with its headquarters in Tarnowskie Góry; (this revolutionary institution functioned as an insurance company for miners and covered the entire Upper Silesian region with 17,821 initial members). In 1857 the first railroad, leading to Opole, reached the town and eight years later Warsaw–Vienna line cut-through as well. Throughout the next few decades, because of its strategic location, the number of railroad lines grew rapidly, and by the end of the 19th century Tarnowskie Góry was well on its way to becoming the second largest marshaling yard in Europe. Poles smuggled large amounts of gunpowder through the town to the Russian Partition of Poland during the January Uprising in 1863.

=== Modern ===
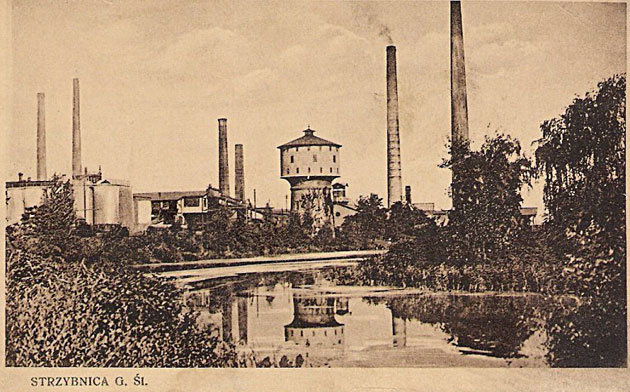
Fryderyk Smelting Works in interwar Poland

In the beginning of the 20th century, the source of the silver ore dried out and the mining stopped completely. According to the 1910 German census, in the city of Tarnowitz 76% of the population reported German as their sole mother tongue while 17% reported Polish, with the remainder reporting as bilingual; in the entire district of Tarnowitz including outlying villages, the figures were 27% German-speaking and 67% Polish-speaking. After World War I ended, between 1919 and 1921 three massive anti-German uprisings took place in entire Upper Silesian region and many of towns residents fought and supported the cause. Soon after the end of the third one, mandated by the Versailles Treaty, the Silesian Plebiscite was held, and in the Tarnowitz district 61.7% voted for integration with newly independent Poland while 38.3% voted to remain with Germany; in the city of Tarnowitz however, 82% of the participants favored Germany in large part due to "imported" votes and the higher proportion of Germans in urban areas. In 1922, after over 300 years of Austrian and Prussian domination, Tarnowskie Góry was returned to Polish governance. In the interwar period the 11th Infantry Regiment of the Polish Army was stationed in Tarnowskie Góry.

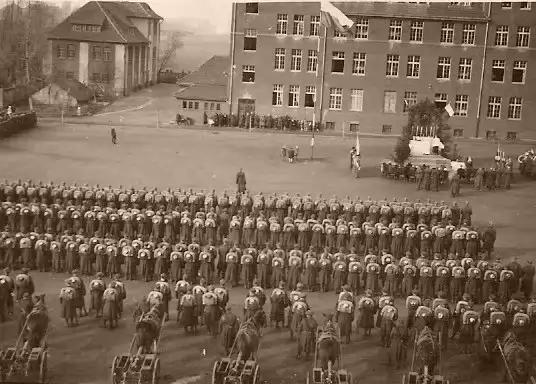
Polish Army barracks in the 1930s

At the onset of World War II in September 1939, Poland was invaded by Germany and Nazi German occupation began. On September 6–8, 1939, the Einsatzgruppe II entered the town to commit various crimes against Poles. Mass searches of Polish organizations, offices and houses, and mass arrests of priests, teachers, intelligentsia and fighters of three anti-German, Silesian Uprisings (1919–1921) took place. The synagogue was burned while German minority enthusiastically welcomed invading Nazi forces. Already by September 1939, the Germans had murdered over 20 Poles in the present-day districts of Lasowice, Strzybnica and Repty Śląskie. Among the victims were miners, former insurgents and a school principal from nearby Chorzów. Germany established and operated a prison for Poles in the town. During the occupation, the Armia Krajowa (Home Army, the leading Polish underground resistance organization) undertook a sabotage campaign against Nazi forces, railroad-transport and local industry. The Germans operated two forced labour subcamps of the Stalag VIII-B/344 prisoner-of-war camp in the town. Liberation of Silesia came in early 1945; in order to save the industrial infrastructure of the region, the Red Army opened an offensive supported by massive numbers of troops with minimal use of heavy artillery and air-bombardment. According to witnesses, the entire operation was extremely fast; countless, shoulder-to-shoulder, crowds of Russian soldiers passed through the town in matter of minutes followed by almost complete still.

== Places and attractions ==
Historic sights of Tarnowskie Góry (examples)

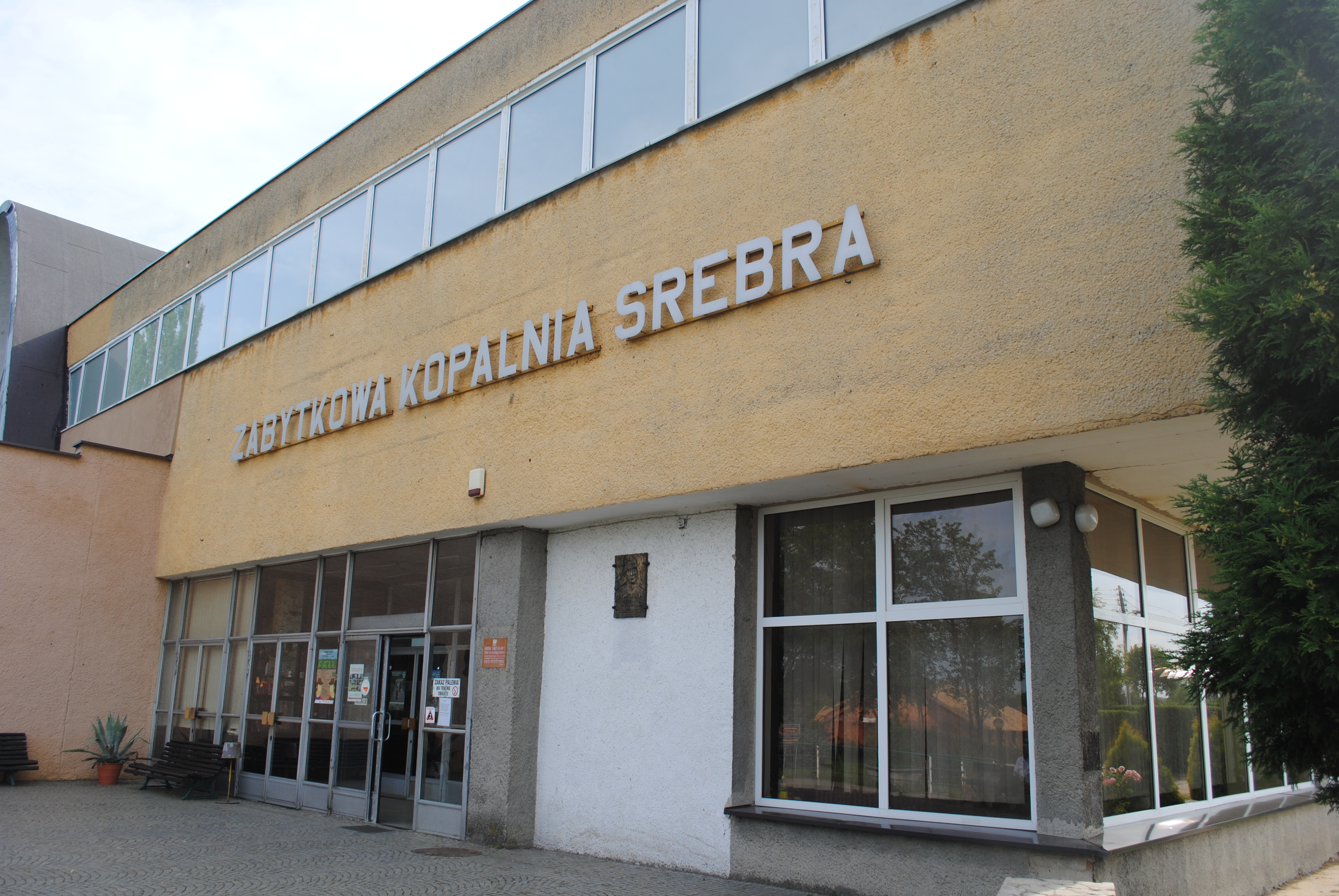
entrance to the Tarnowskie Góry Historic Silver Mine

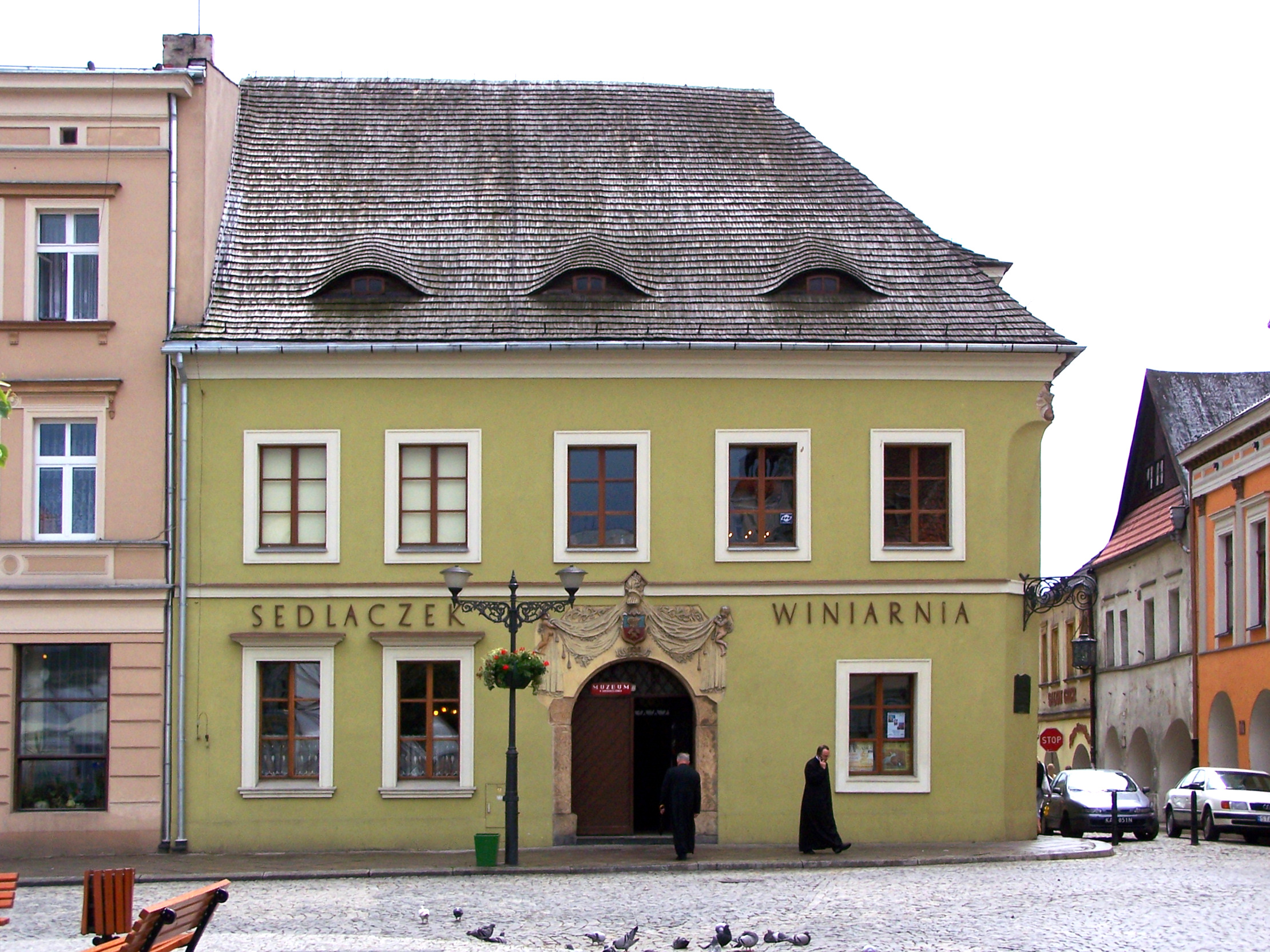
Sedlaczek Wine House

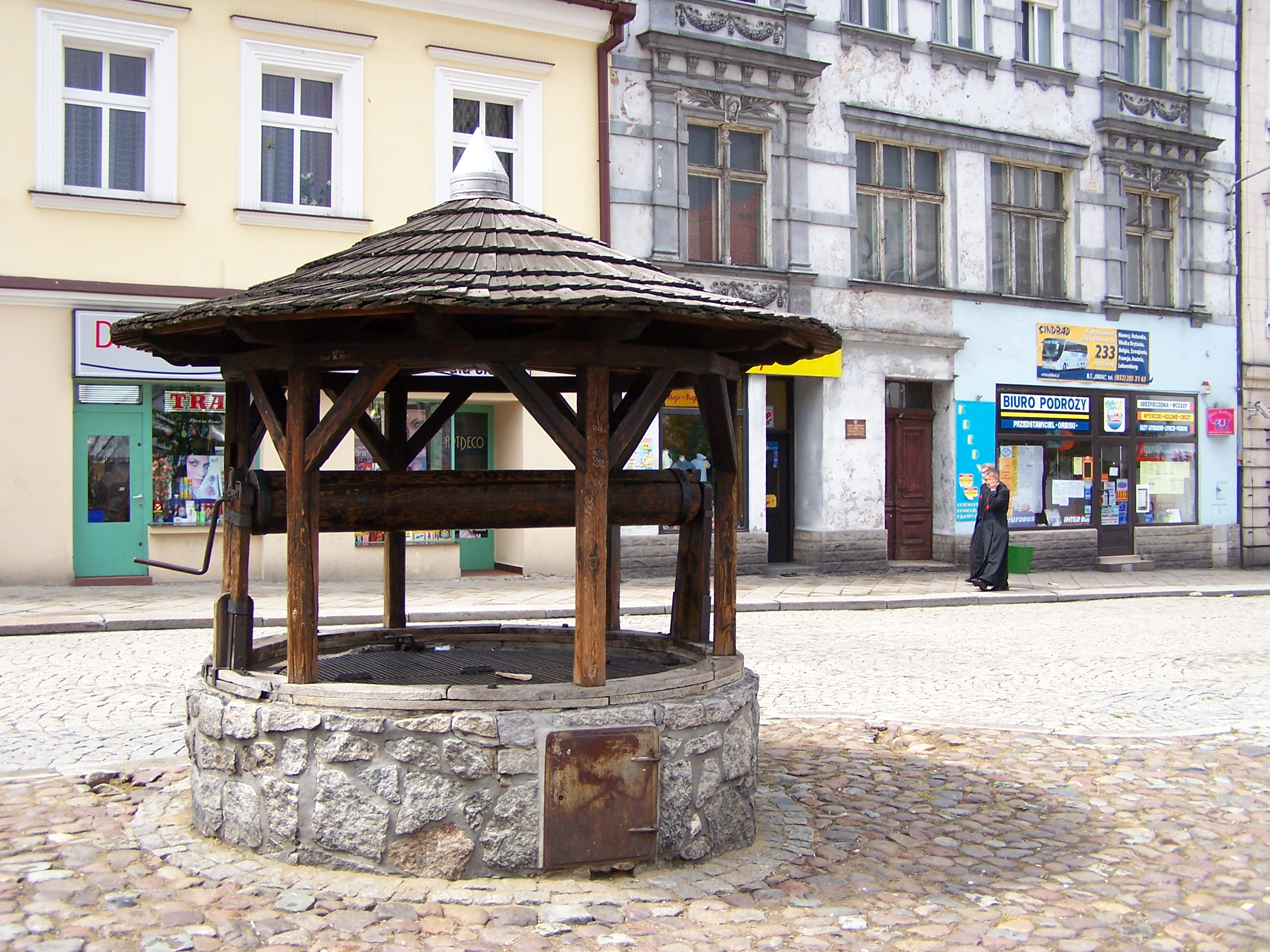
old well at the Market Square

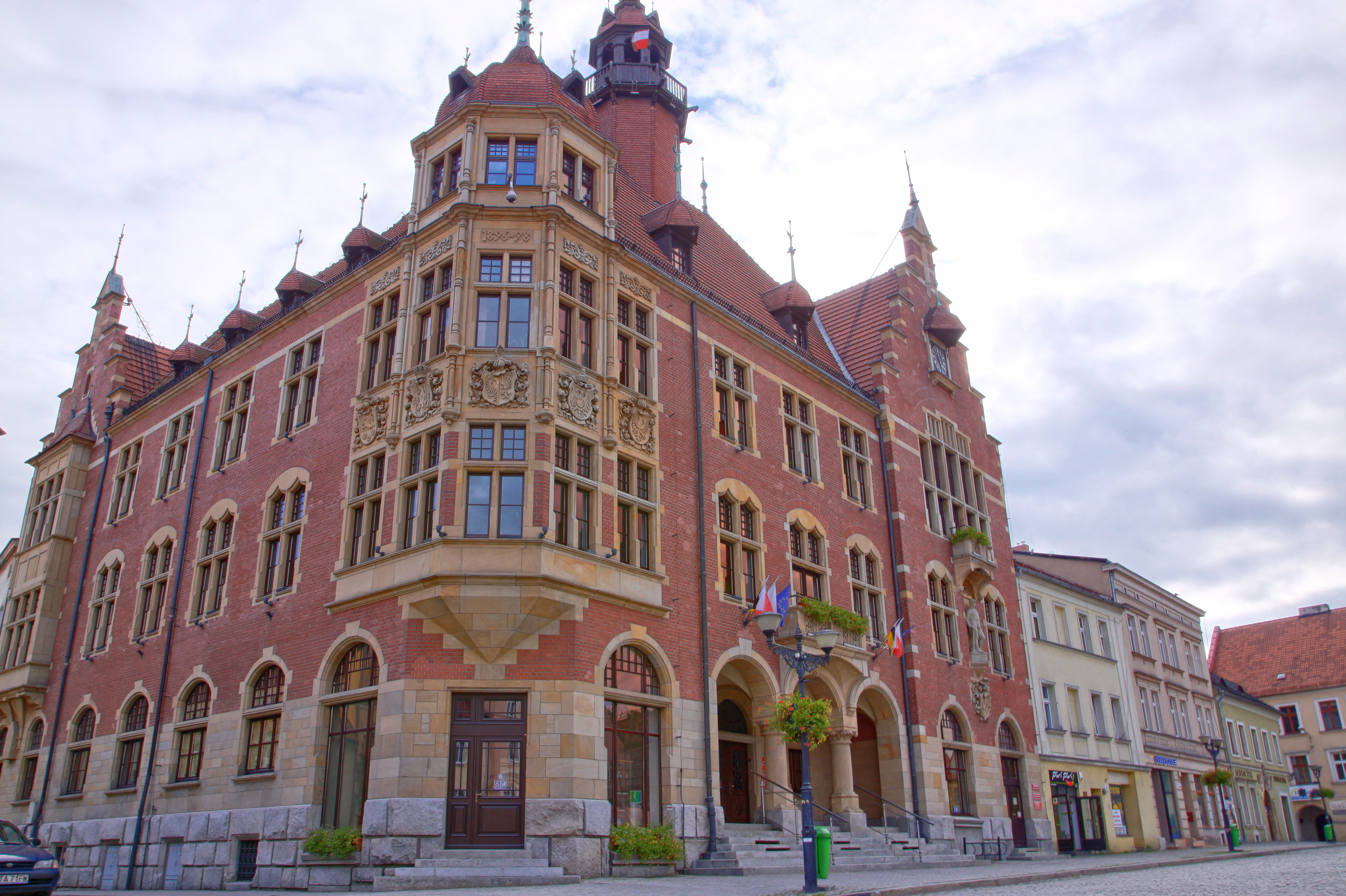
Town Hall

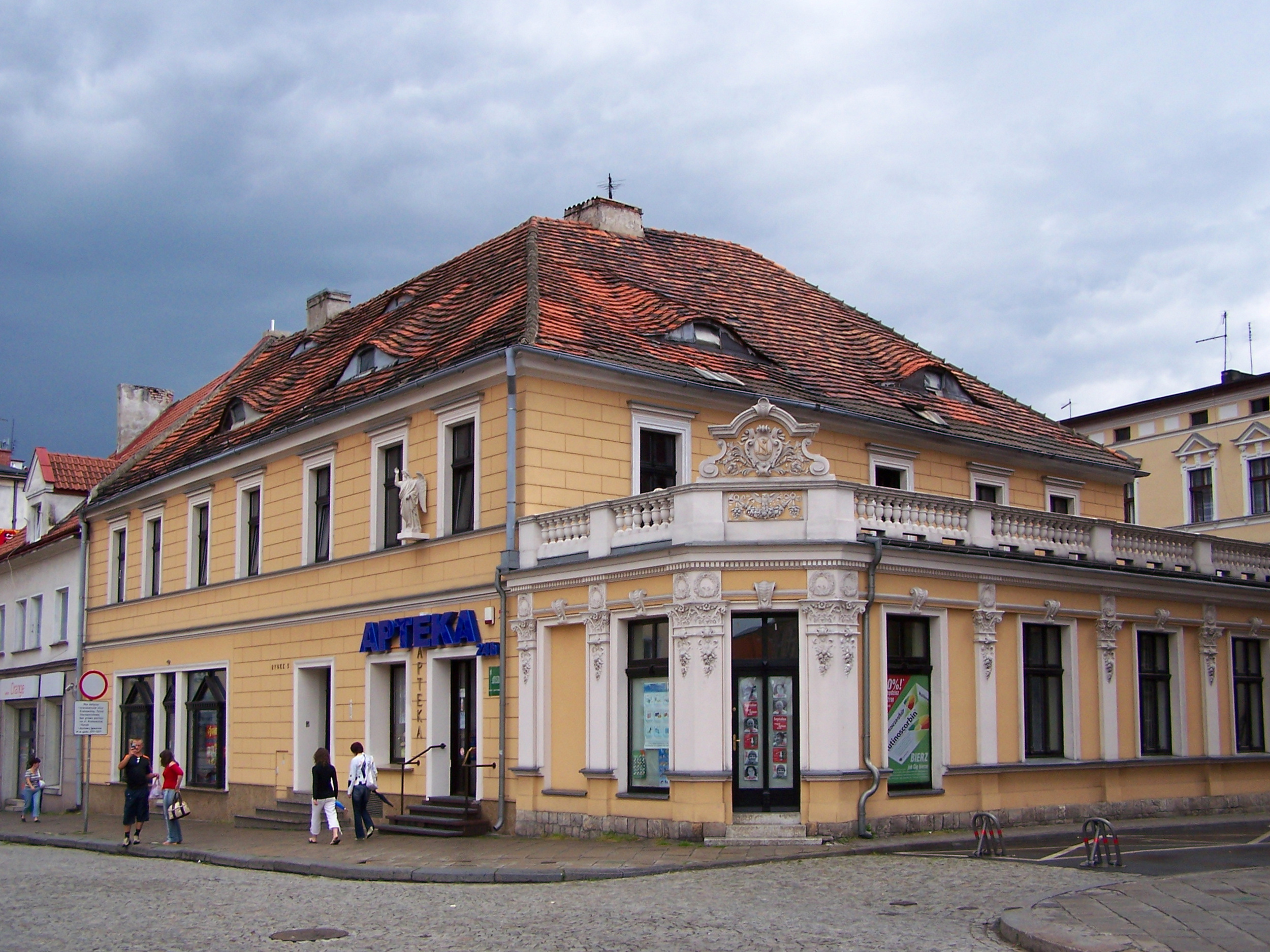
building of the town's oldest pharmacy

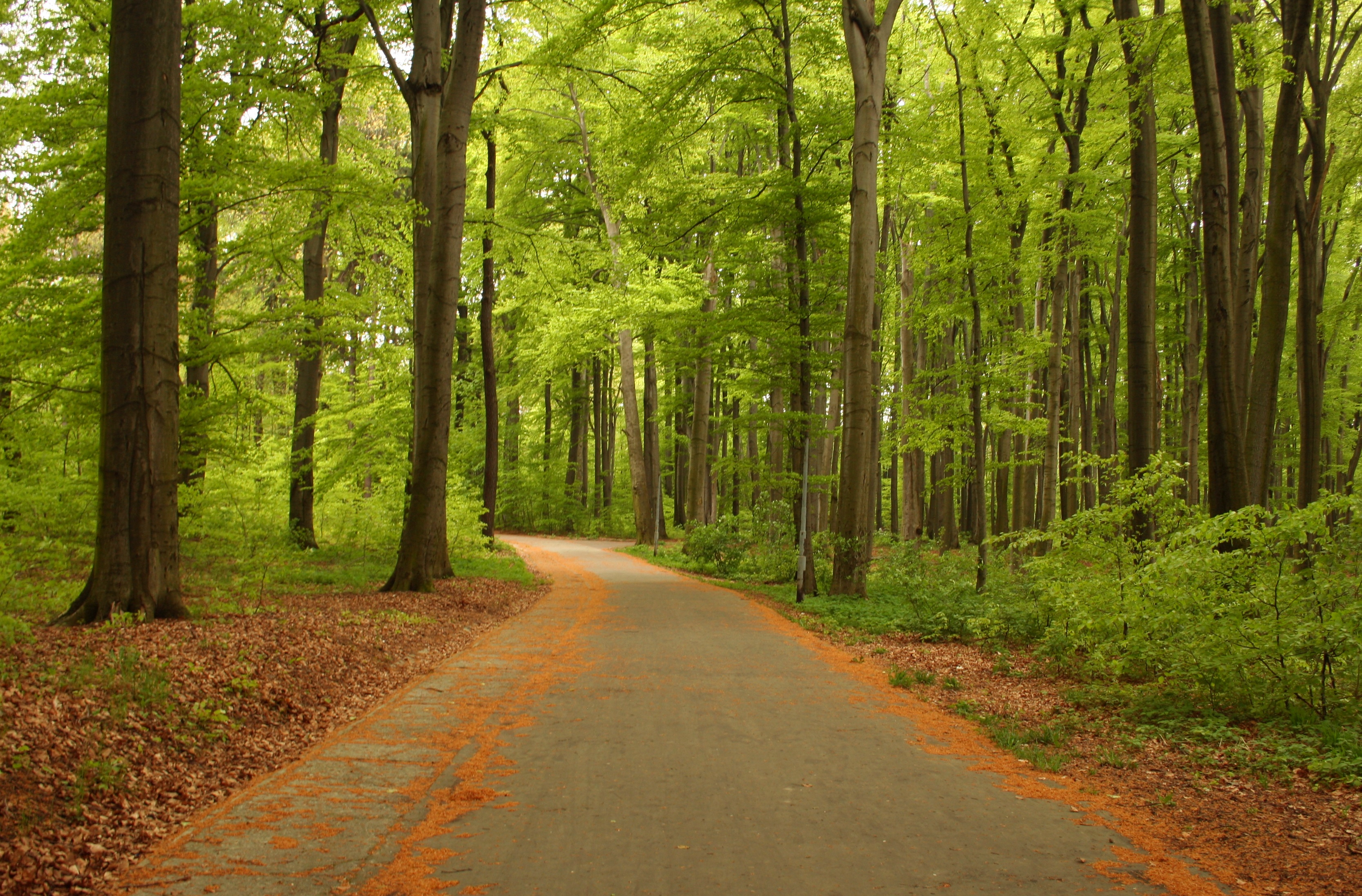
Repty Park

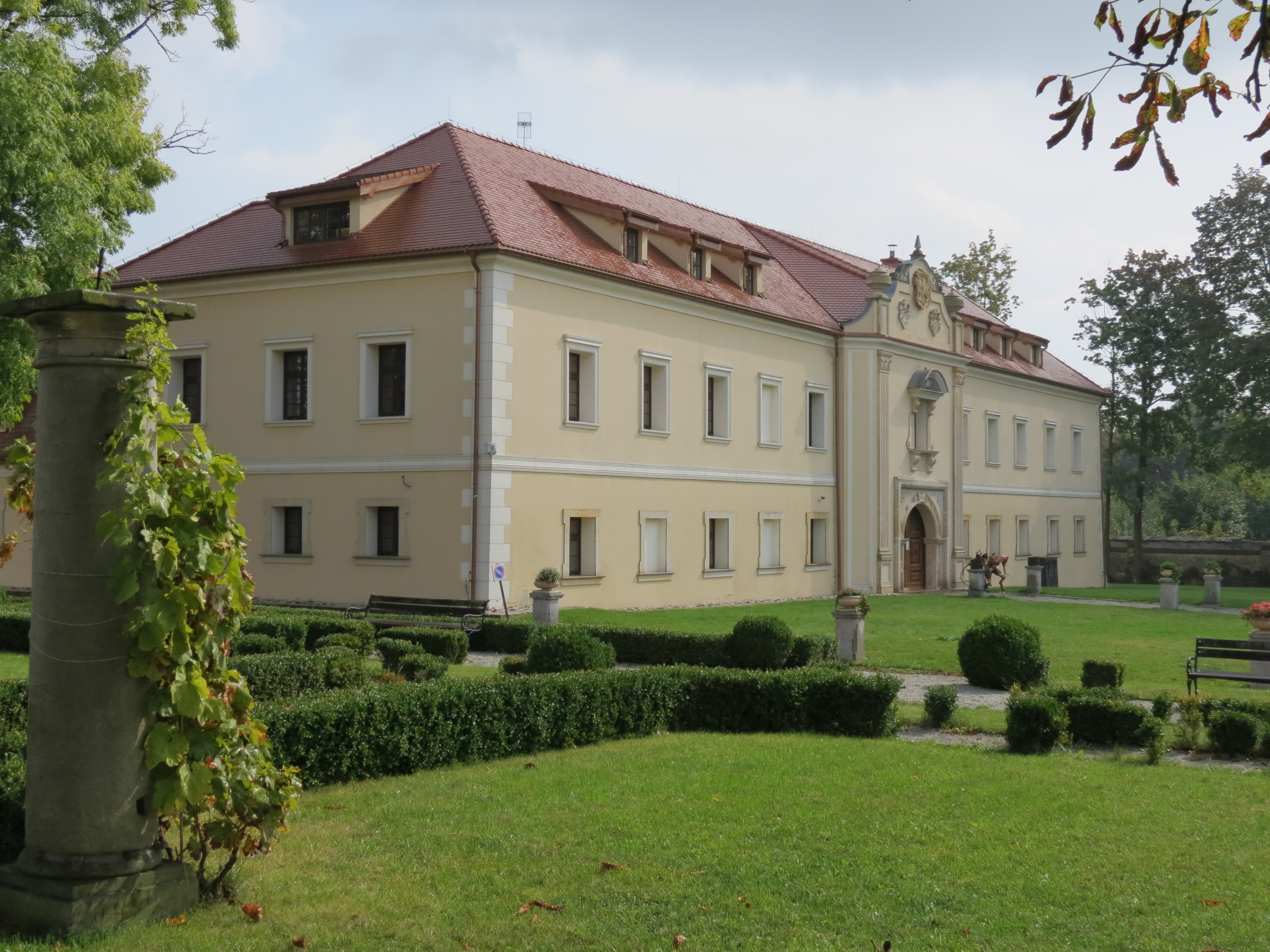
Stare Tarnowice Castle

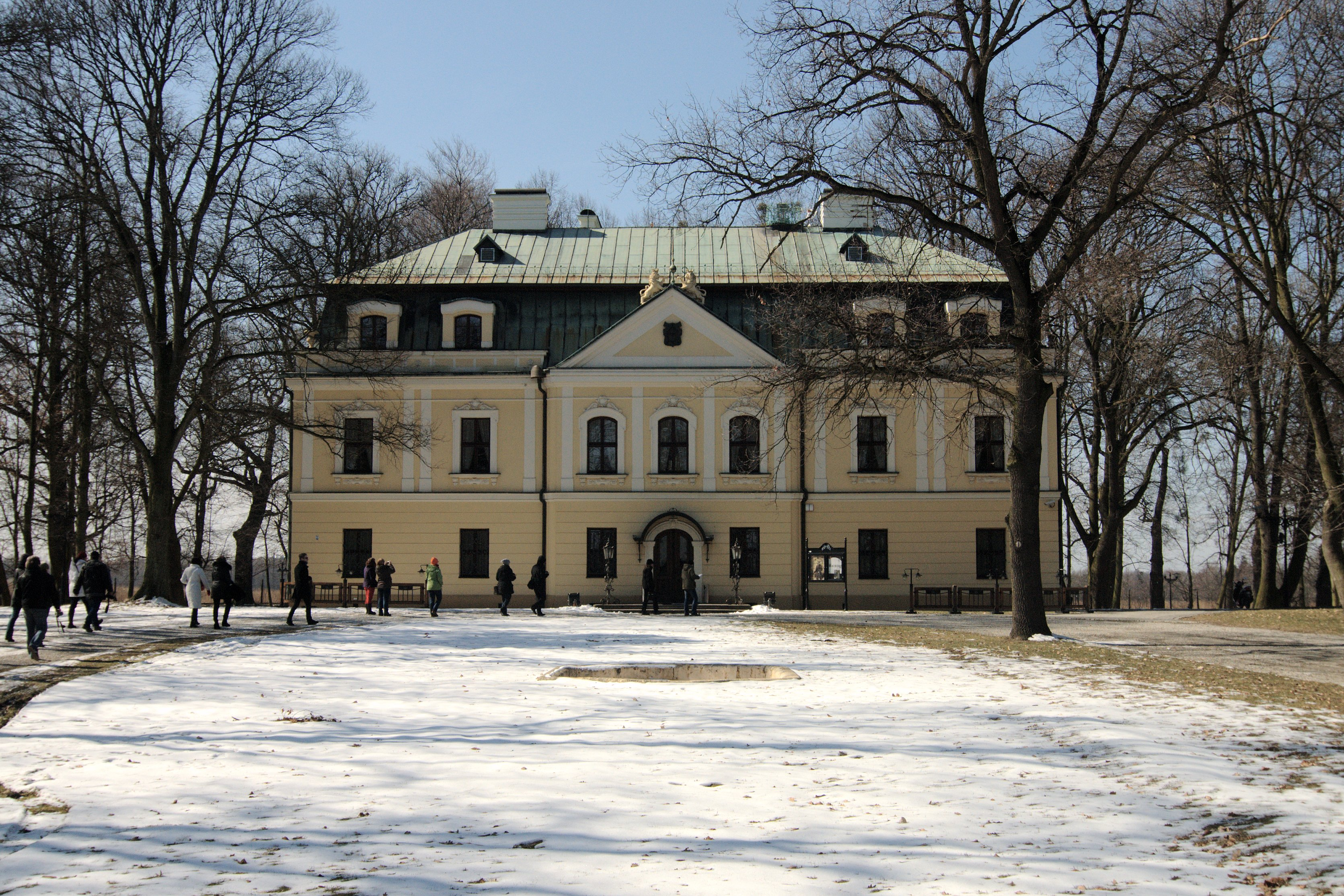
Rybna Palace

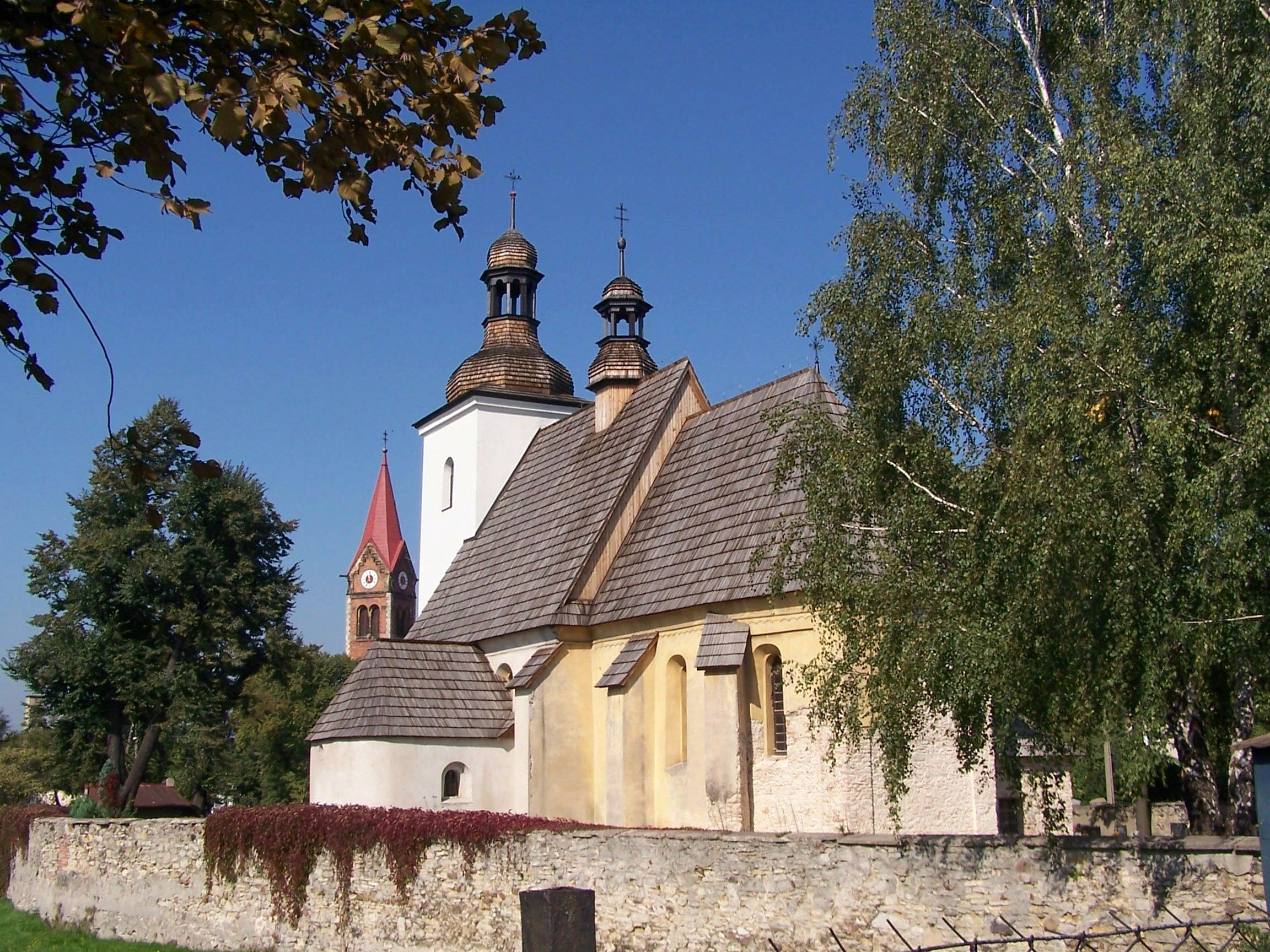
St. Martin Church

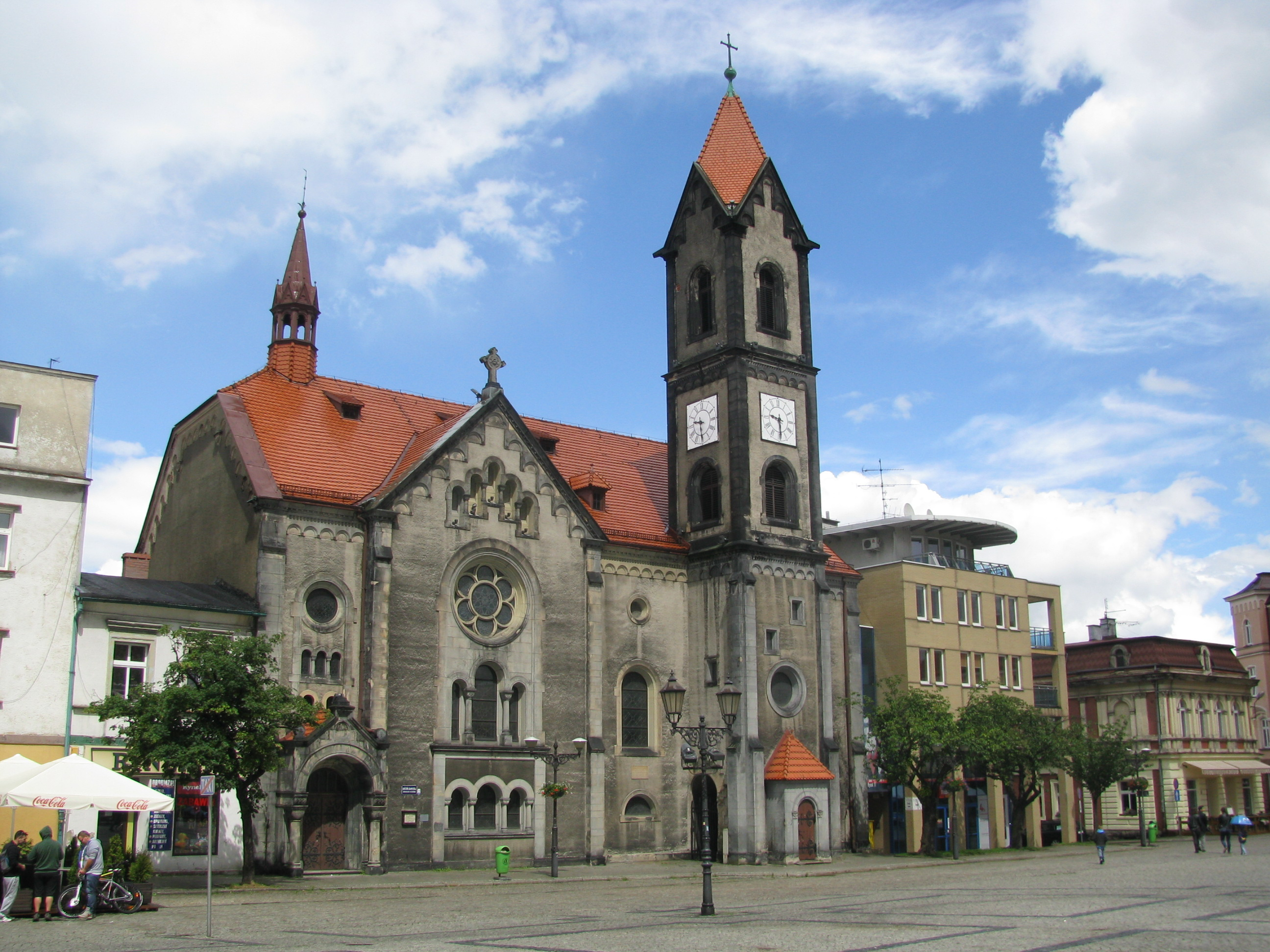
Church of the Savior

- Historical Mine Of Silver Ores, a UNESCO World Heritage Site.
- Black Trout Adit, one of Poland's official national Historic Monuments since 2004.
- The Tarnowskie Góry Museum, opened in 1958.
- 16th-century Gwareks' bell-tower ("Gwarek" an old-Polish reference to miners).
- Gwarki Tarnogórskie – annual event since 1957 in the first half of September, celebrating the mining-culture of the region.

== Notable people ==
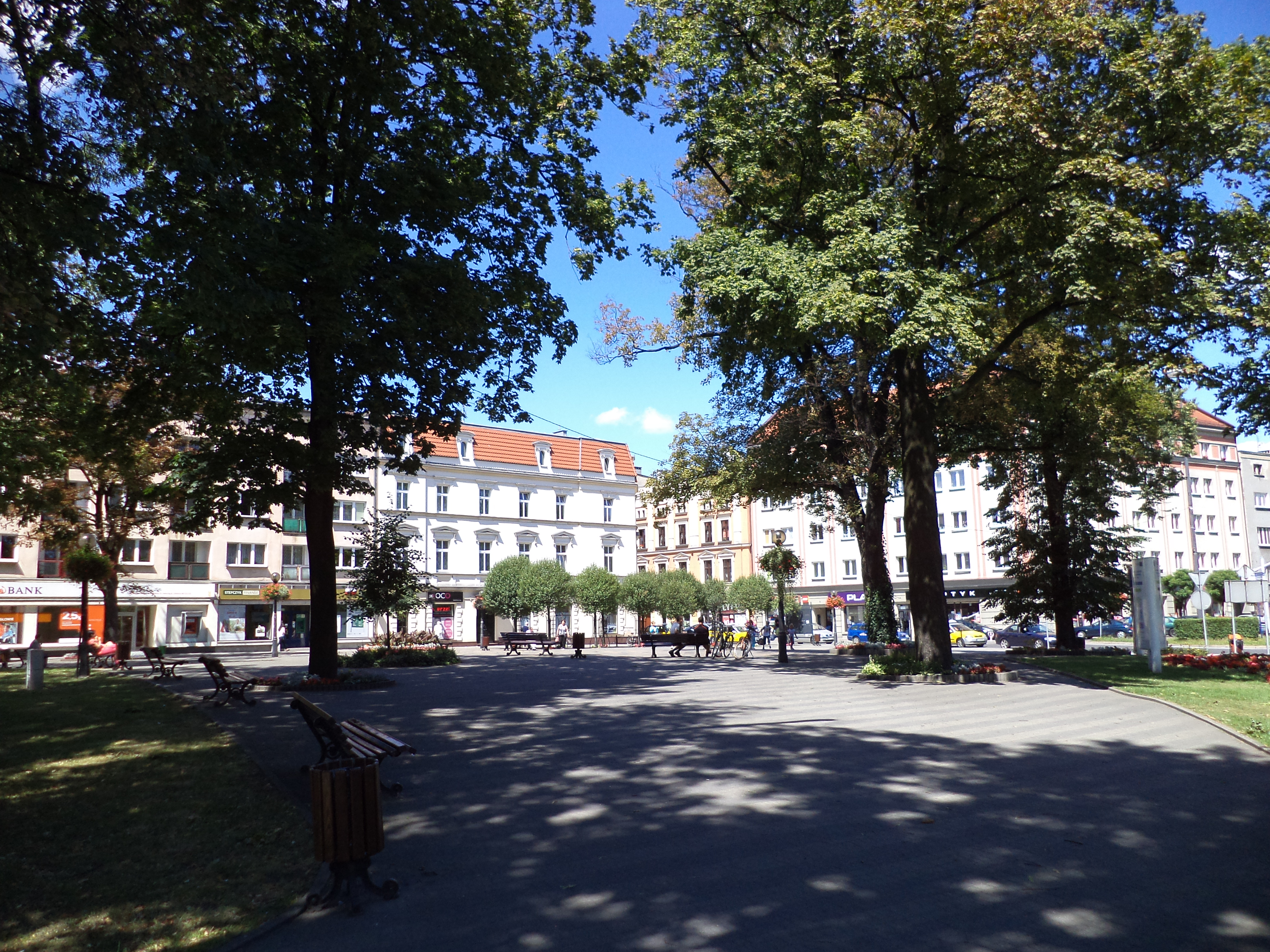
Liberty Square

- John II the Good (1460–1532), Duke of Opole, last one of the Opole line of the Piast dynasty, co-founder of Tarnowskie Góry.
- George, Margrave of Brandenburg-Ansbach (1484–1543), from the House of Hohenzollern, co-founder of Tarnowskie Góry.
- George Frederick, Margrave of Brandenburg-Ansbach (1539–1603), from the House of Hohenzollern, who gave a coat of arms to Tarnowskie Góry.
- Rudolf von Carnall (1804–1874), engineering geologist
- Donnersmarck family, for over two centuries owners of most of the town and surrounding lands.
- Alexander Kohut (1842–1894), talmudist and orientalist, rabbi of Tarnowitz
- Pauline Thérèse Lachmann, Countess Henckel von Donnersmarck, also known as La Païva (1819–1884)
- Michał Lewek (1878–1967), Roman Catholic priest
- Martin Max (born 1968), German footballer
- Jan Miodek (born 1946), linguist
- Dariusz Świercz (born 1994), chess grandmaste
- Józef Wandzik (born 1963), footballer
- Carl Wernicke (1848–1905), physician and neuropathologist
- Robert Wojsyk (born 1990), footballer
- Klaus Wyrtki (1925–2013), geophysicist
- Łukasz Żelezny (born 1981), composer and DJ

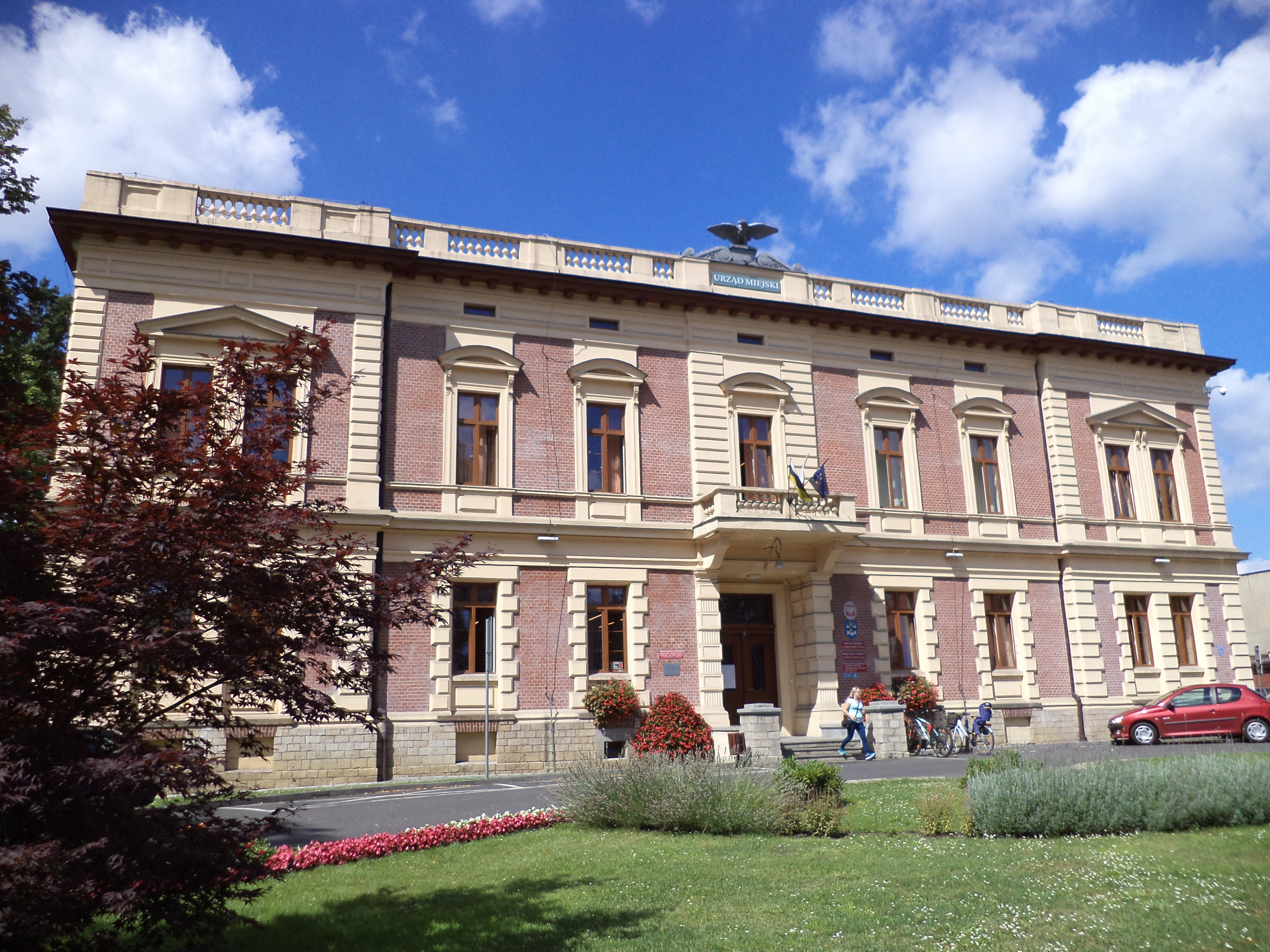
Municipal office

== Twin towns – sister cities ==
Tarnowskie Góry is twinned with:

- Békéscsaba, Hungary
- Bernburg, Germany
- Kutná Hora, Czech Republic
- Méricourt, France

== See also ==
- Spoil tip in Tarnowskie Góry
