= Michał Lewek =

Polish priest and activist

Michał Lewek (1878–1967) was a Polish Roman Catholic priest and activist. He is notable for his work in Berlin, where he administered to the Polish migrant worker community, and in Silesia, where he took an active role in the Upper Silesia plebiscite of 1921. Beginning in 1922, he served as minister to Tarnowskie Góry and, despite multiple arrests under the German occupation during the Second World War, continued his service there until his death in 1967.
