= Fryderyk Smelting Works =

Silver and lead smelting plant of Poland

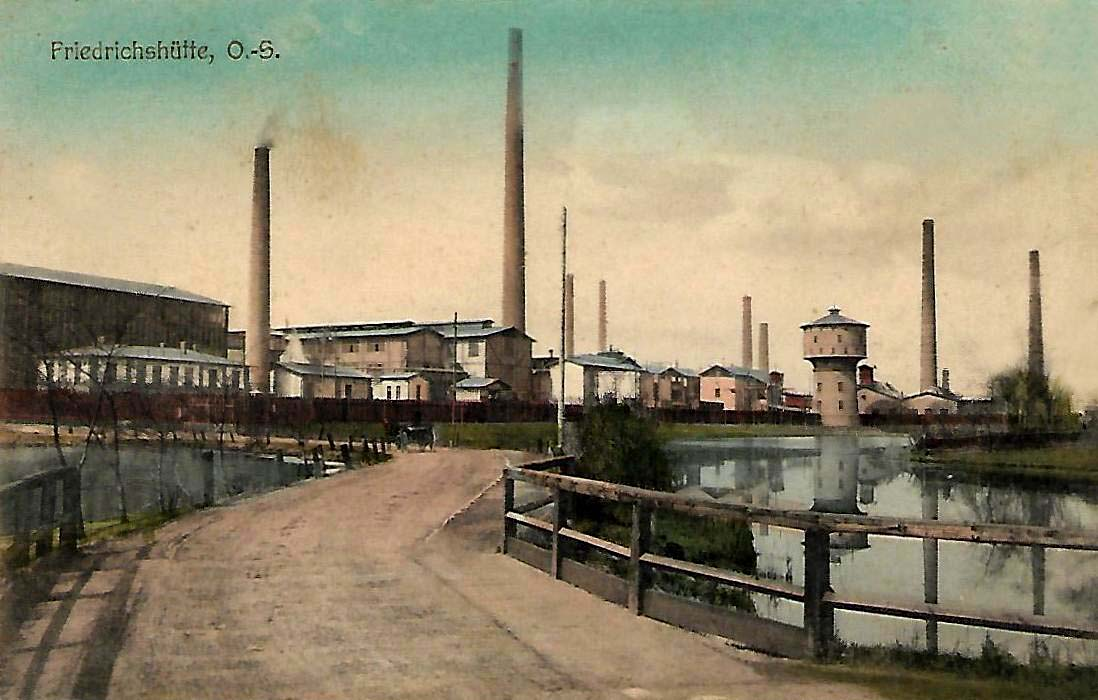
- The buildings of the Fryderyk Smelting Works (German: Friedrichshütte) with the Smelting Pond (German: Friedrichshüttenteich) on a postcard from 1910–1915
- Native name: Huta Fryderyk
- Founded: September 27, 1786; 238 years ago
- Defunct: February 15, 1932 (decision); April 21, 1933 (beginning of liquidation); February 15, 1932 (defunct)
- Headquarters: Strzybnica, Poland

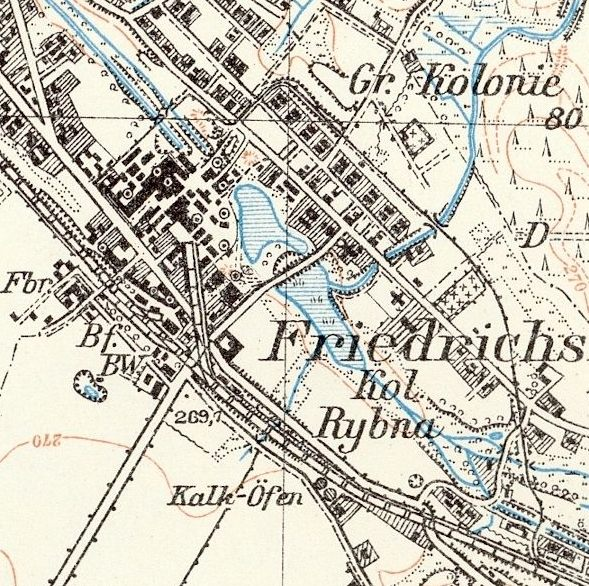
Fryderyk Smelting Works on a fragment of a German map of Upper Silesia from the early 20th century

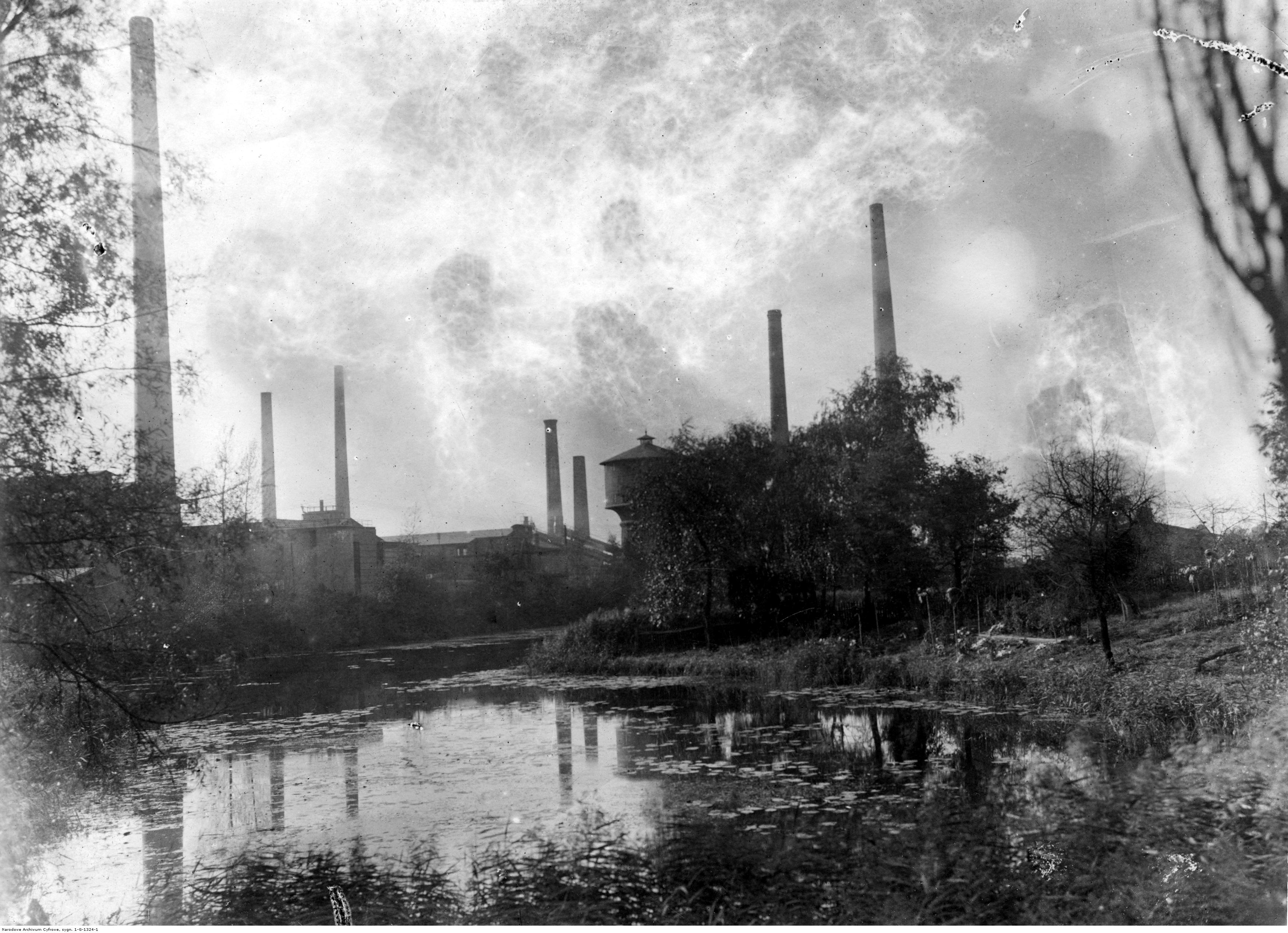
Fryderyk Smelting Works, general view, with the pond in the foreground

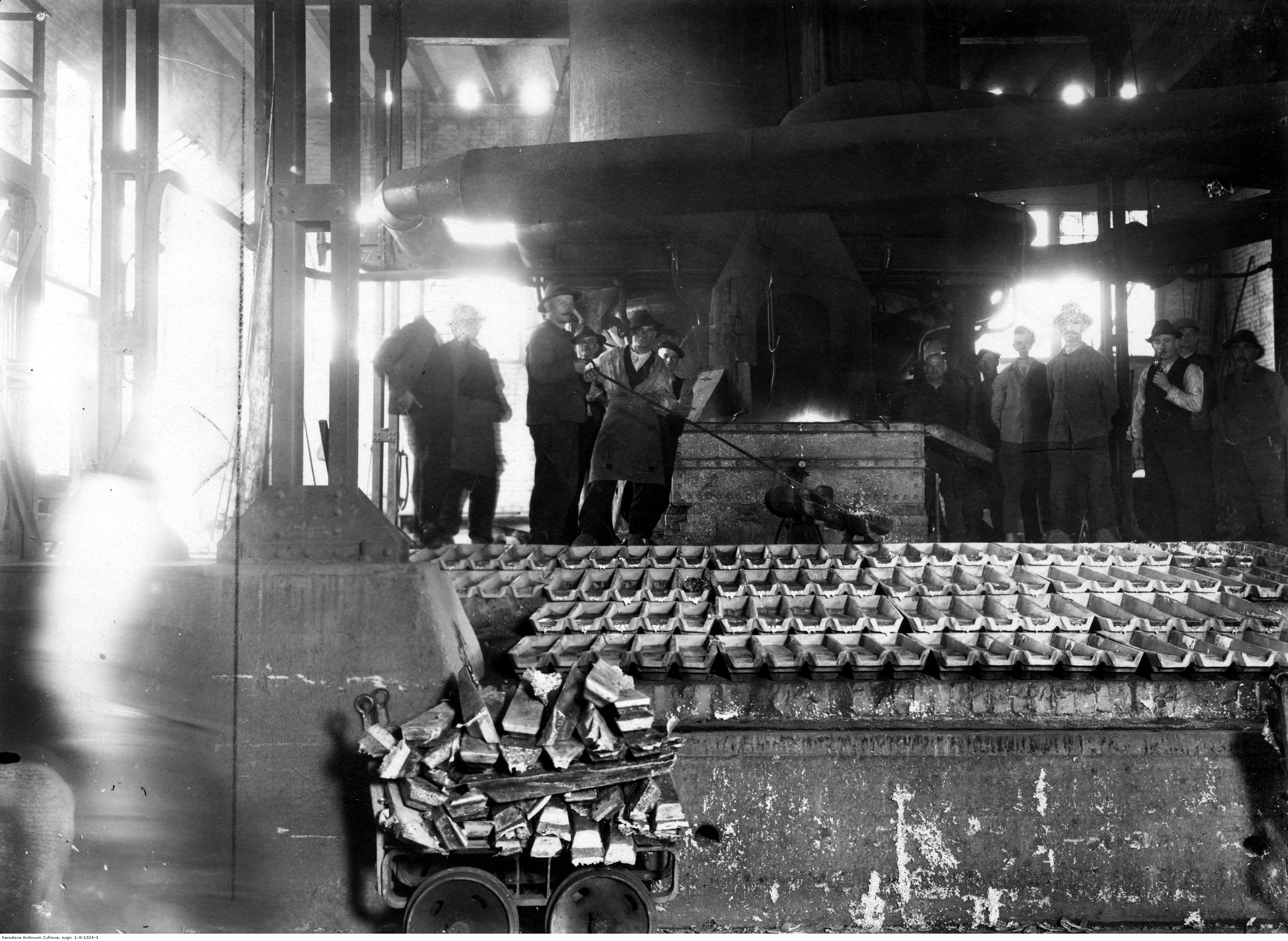
Workers at the foundry

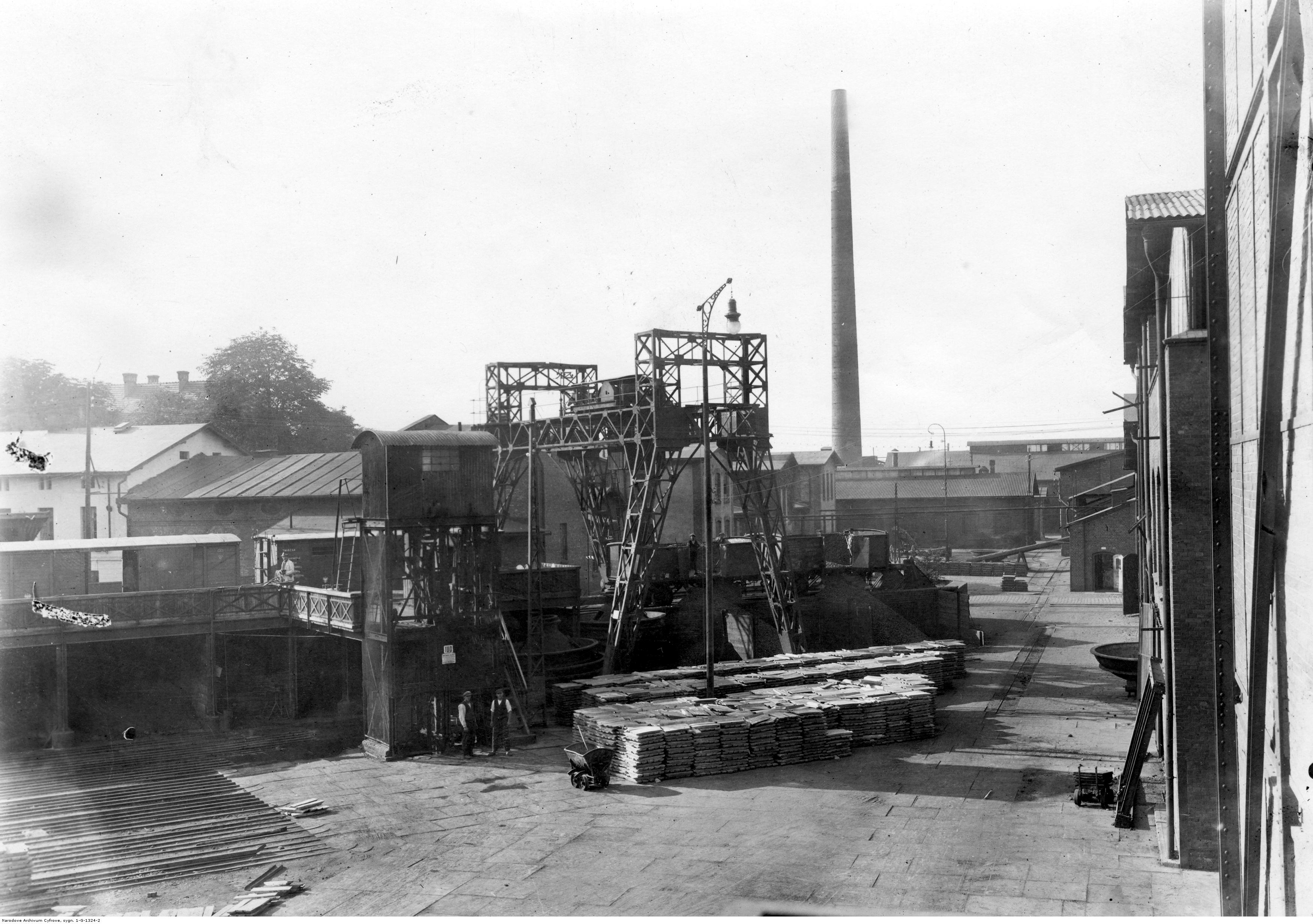
Plant yard

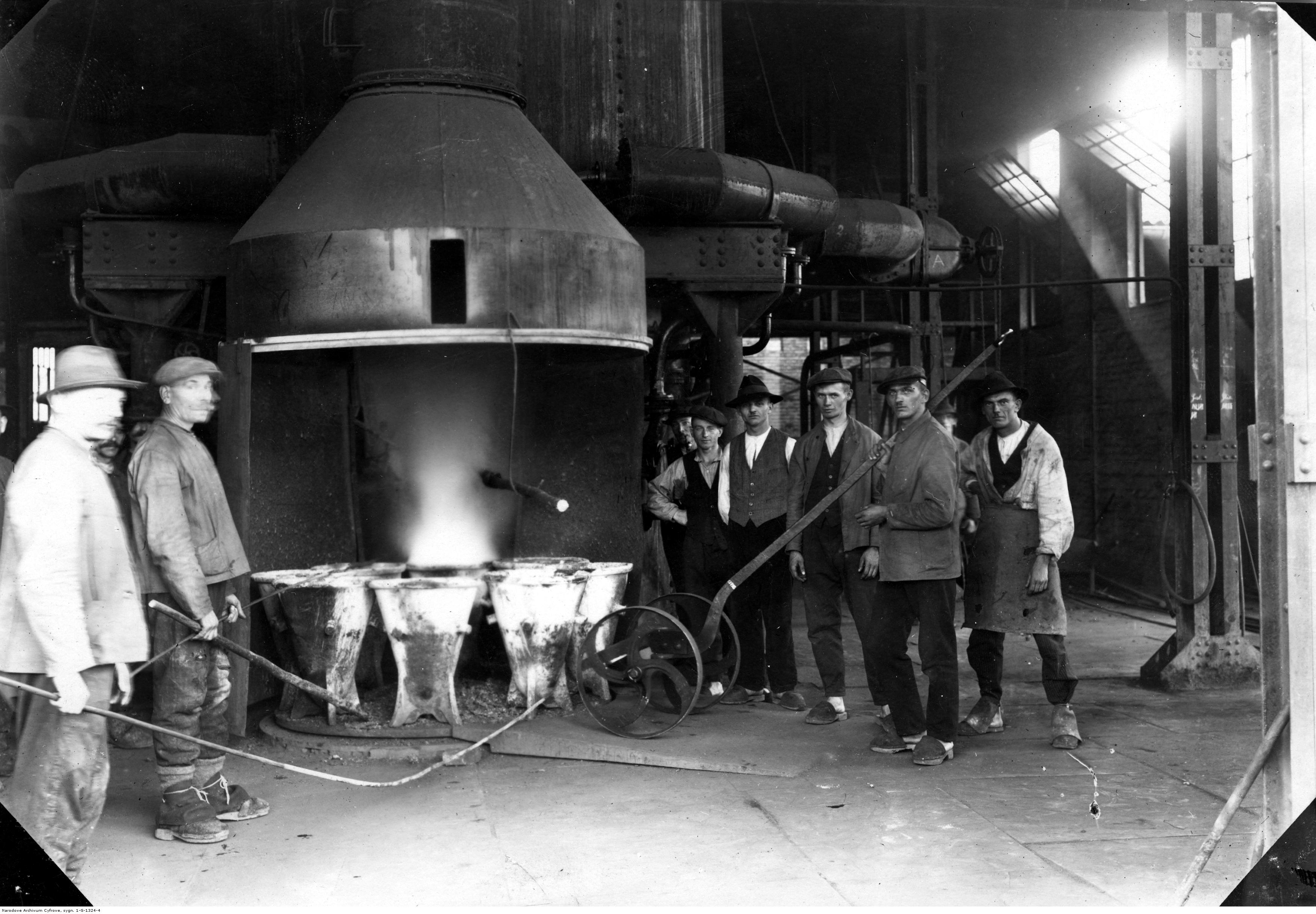
Workers at work

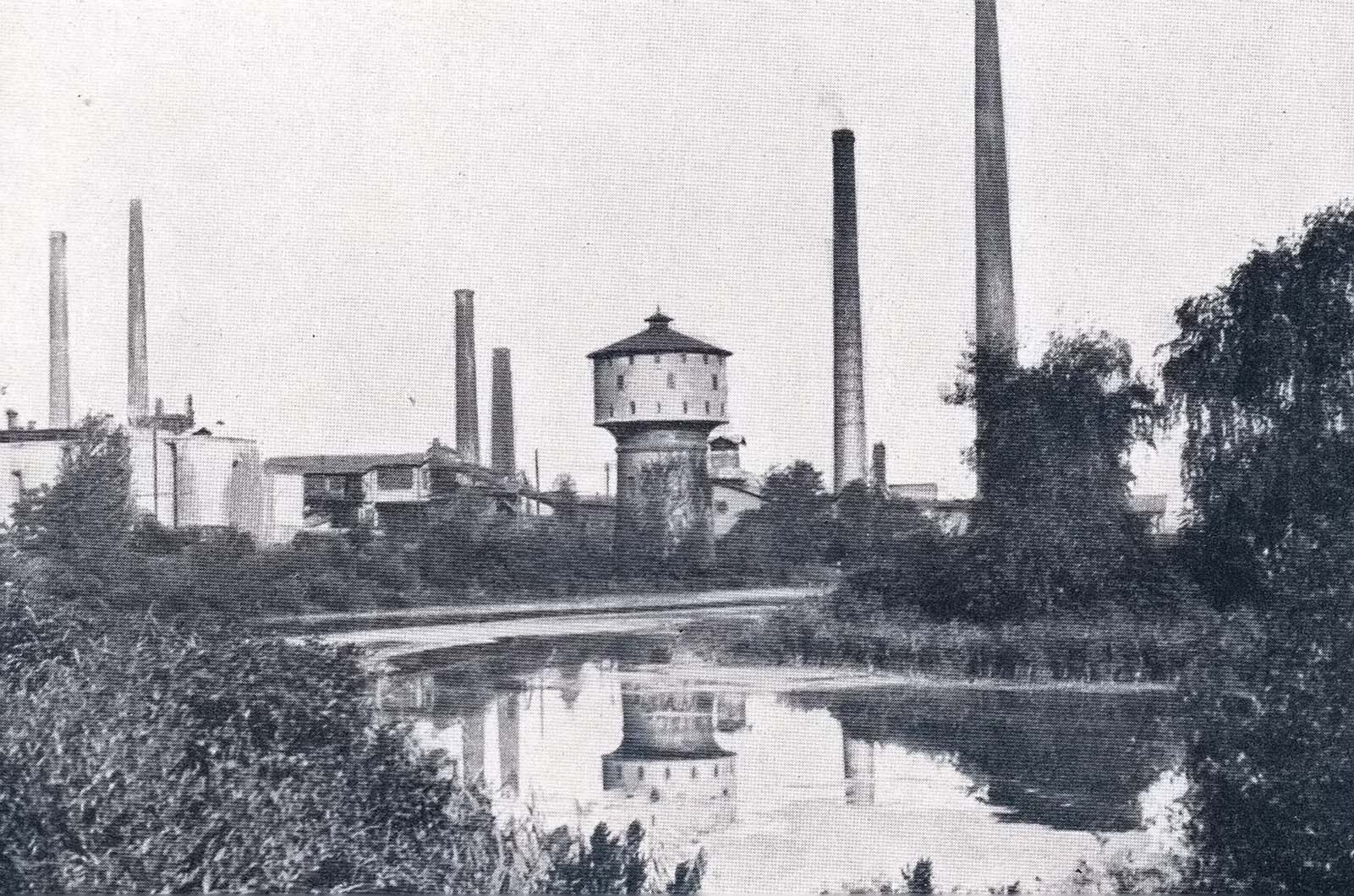
The buildings of the Fryderyk Smelting Works around 1912. In the middle is the water tower

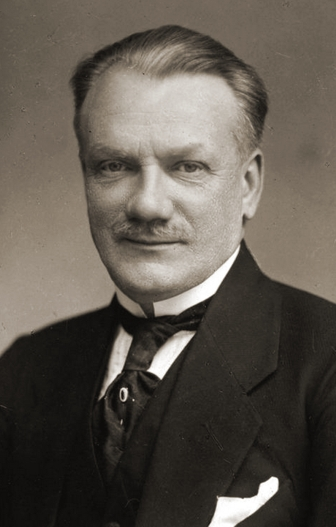
Antoni Kamieński, member of the directorate in the 1920s

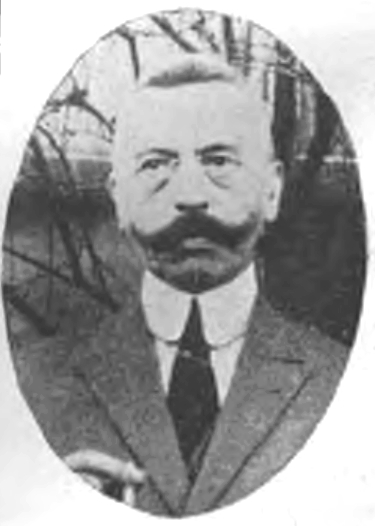
Clemens Mülkay, general manager of the smelting works circa 1927

Fryderyk Smelting Works (German: Friedrichshütte), officially Royal Fryderyk Smelting Works (German: Königliche Friedrichshütte) was a silver and lead smelting plant operating from 1786 to 1933 located in Upper Silesia in Strzybnica (since 1975 a district of Tarnowskie Góry).

It was founded on the initiative of Count Friedrich Wilhelm von Reden, who made significant contributions to the industrial development of Upper Silesia. It was named after the King of Prussia, Frederick the Great. The plant processed ores from the Royal Fryderyk Mine (German: Königliche Friedrichsgrube) in Bobrowniki (nowadays the Historic Silver Mine in Tarnowskie Góry). It gave rise to a new settlement – Strzybnica (German: Friedrichshütte) – built for the plant's workers. In 1922, it was taken over by the Second Polish Republic and hosted dignitaries such as Marshal Józef Piłsudski and President Stanisław Wojciechowski. In 1937, after over 150 years of operation, the plant was closed. Soon after World War II, the area was taken over by the Strzybnica Metal Works, later renamed the Zamet Mechanical Works in Tarnowskie Góry in 1976.

== Location ==
The area of the former Fryderyk Smelting Works (formerly the Zamet Mechanical Works, currently Zamet Budowa Maszyn S.A.) is located in the north-western district of Tarnowskie Góry – Strzybnica – between Zagórska Street (part of national road 11), Father Edward Płonka Street (formerly Metalowców Street), Kościelna Street, and – until 22 December 2016 – Zametowska Street. Nearby runs railway line no. 144, which connects Tarnowskie Góry station with Opole Główne station and until April 2018 had an industrial spur leading to the plant.

== History ==
=== From 1786 to 1862 ===
The silver and lead smelting plant at the site of the former Donnersmarcks' hammer mill in Piaseczna (German: Piassetzna) near Tarnowskie Góry (German: Tarnowitz) was built by the Prussian government on the initiative of Count Friedrich Wilhelm von Reden in just six months in 1786. The construction was overseen by Johann Friedrich Wedding, brought to Silesia by Reden. Smelting of ore in two blast furnaces began on 27 September 1786, using water from the drainage canal of the Boże Wspomóż adit (German: Gotthelf), while the ore was supplied from the Royal Fryderyk Mine (German: Königliche Friedrichsgrube) in Bobrowniki. Initially, charcoal was used as fuel, which was gradually replaced with coke produced on-site from around 1790 to reduce production costs and achieve higher temperatures. In the 1830s, black coal was also introduced for flaming.

During the initial period of operation, the smelter produced 32,384 kg of silver, 28,050 tons of lead, and 30,142 tons of lead monoxide.

In 1799, the smelter employed almost a hundred workers. By the end of this period, with the expansion of the plant to include 6 coke-fired furnaces and a blowing engine powered by a steam engine with a capacity of 16 horsepower (in 1858), employment increased to 180 people.

=== From 1863 to 1886 ===
During the second stage of operation, the Fryderyk Smelting Works became independent. A royal smelting office (German: Kgl. Hüttenamt zu Friedrichshütte) was established there. Previously, it was supervised by the Royal Upper Silesian Mining Office in Tarnowskie Góry.

The beginning of this period saw increased ore deliveries from the Royal Fryderyk Mine and smaller private mines. This necessitated the expansion of the plant and modernization of production technology. A new method of silvering lead was introduced, allowing for increased lead production at the expense of lead monoxide. Additionally, in 1868, a zinc distillation furnace was built, enabling the production of pure zinc from the slag produced during ore smelting. The number of furnaces increased to 11. From 1867 to 1886, lead production increased from 3,596 to 15,061 tons (319%), while lead monoxide production increased from 827 to 1,697 tons (105%).

Employment also increased during this period, with the number of employees fluctuating as follows:

Year	Number of employees
1863	214
1866	230
1868	183
1876	312
1883	333
1886	544

The employees of the smelter were mainly residents of nearby villages such as Rybna, Stare Tarnowice, and Piaseczna, for whom 13 houses and a vocational school were built. This marked the beginning of a new town, which took its name directly from the smelter – Friedrichshütte or Friedrichshütte O.S., where O.S. stood for Oberschlesien – Upper Silesia. In 1886, the construction of an Evangelical-Augsburg church was completed, followed by a Catholic church a year later. Today, this area is a district of Tarnowskie Góry called Strzybnica.

In total, between 1786 and 1886 (over 100 years), the Fryderyk Smelting Works produced 167,556 kg of silver, 178,011 tons of lead, and 52,726 tons of lead monoxide, with a total value of 106,358,076 Deutsche Marks. From 1865, lead was exported to Austria and Russia, and from 1865 to 1877, also to America.

=== From 1887 to 1933 ===
During this period, there was a peak in the modernization of furnace constructions, allowing for the roasting of poorer ores and the separation of sulfur from them, which enabled the start of sulfuric acid production in 1900. The plant was expanded again between 1900 and 1909, employment increased (to 640 people in 1910), and the equipment was electrified.

Numerous processing plants were established in the vicinity of the smelter, including a factory for lead shot and sheet metal (owned by Giesches Erben since 1887), and a lead products factory founded in 1895 directly adjacent to the Fryderyk Smelting Works, owned by Bleiindustrie-Aktiengesellschaft vorm. Jung & Lindig from Freiberg in Saxony.

During the Third Silesian Uprising, supervision of the smelter was taken over by a representative of the Polish plebiscite committee. On 22 June 1922, the plant was officially taken over by the Polish treasury, becoming a state-owned enterprise. On August 26 of the same year, Chief of State Józef Piłsudski visited the plant and personally poured the first block of silver in the Polish smelter. On 16 March 1923, under the name Polish Treasure Lead and Silver Smelting Works in Strzybnica (Upper Silesia) Leased Company Tarnowskie Góry SA (abbreviated as Tarnoferme), the company was transferred to a corporation, half of the capital of which belonged to the treasury, and the other half to private French capital (Mineraux et Métaux Paris). As a result, there was a limitation on the supremacy of state authorities over the smelter and practically no possibility of interference in the rights of the owners. A month after the establishment of the leased company, President of Poland Stanisław Wojciechowski visited the smelter.

Around 1927, the workforce numbered approximately 500 employees. In 1925, the smelter in Strzybnica produced 2,100 tons of lead, 850 tons of lead monoxide, and 1,500 kg of silver. Every year, about 6,000 tons of sulfuric acid were also produced. By 1932, this had decreased to only 1,500 tons of lead, 630 tons of lead monoxide, and 1,000 kg of silver. This was due to the loss, after the division of Upper Silesia to Germany, of the western mining area of the Fryderyk mine; until 1922, over 3,000 tons of ore from this mine were smelted, but from 1922, it was only 500 tons.

Around 1927, the management of the smelter included engineer Clemens Mülkay and former Minister of Internal Affairs Antoni Kamieński. On 15 February 1932, the decision was made to close the plant, and on 21 April 1933, the liquidation of the Tarnoferme company began. The slag accumulated around the plant and the remnants of ores from the mining areas of Brzozowice, Cecylia, and Nowa Helena were purchased by the Giesche company. The liquidation of the plant was completed on 25 July 1937.

Among the reasons for the closure of the smelter were:

- The aforementioned loss of the western mining area of the Fryderyk mine, which reduced the amount of smelted own ore;
- the increase in production costs due to the necessity of importing lead ores from Australia, Germany, and Romania, among others, and the difficulties in processing ore of various origins;
- the depletion of lead deposits in its own mining field Fryderyk;
- the declining demand for lead and the decrease in its prices on world markets caused by the Great Depression.

=== After liquidation ===
Industrial activity on the site of the former lead and silver smelter was reactivated in 1946. A cast iron foundry, a pattern shop, and design and mechanical departments were launched. New machines were installed in the halls, while the original furnaces from the late 18th century were mindlessly destroyed. In 1949, a company called Strzybnica Metal Works was established, supervised by the Central Management of Non-Ferrous Metals Industry in Katowice. A year later, the name of the plant was changed to Processing Plant Strzybnica. Between 1953 and 1954, a project to expand the plant with a steel casting foundry and a machine park was implemented.

On 1 April 1961, as a result of the merger of the Strzybnica plant with the Mechanical and Assembly Plant of Non-Ferrous Ore Mining in Piekary Śląskie, the Mechanical Plant of Non-Ferrous Metals Industry Zamet was established in Strzybnica.

In 1964, a new mechanical processing department was put into operation, and in 1966, iron foundry and prototype departments were established. Additionally, electric and experimental production plants were created. In 1971, the design department was expanded. During this period, production of machinery, equipment, steel structures, parts, and components for plants belonging to the Non-Ferrous Metals Mining and Metallurgical Union in Katowice was launched. This included, among other things, reinforcements and shaft cages, overburden and underburden devices, buckets and mine carts, and conveyor belts for mining, flotation machines, and pumps for ore enrichment plants, coolers and pipelines for chemical plants, electrolytic tanks, foundry machines, and equipment for zinc rectification for smelters, as well as equipment for plastic processing of non-ferrous metals. Armament production was also started between 1977 and 1979. In 1975, gear machining nests and a heat treatment department were launched. A year later, after the merger of the town of Strzybnica with the city of Tarnowskie Góry, the name of the plant was changed to Mechanical Plant Zamet in Tarnowskie Góry.

From 1974 to 1980, the management of Zamet supported the reconstruction of the Warkoczów Palace in Rybna, sponsored housing development from 1981 to 1982, and built a holiday resort for plant employees near the reservoir in Pniowiec.

In 1986, machine exports began to countries including Yugoslavia, East Germany, Czechoslovakia, the USSR, Romania, West Germany, the Netherlands, and Italy. Celebrations were also held to commemorate the 200th anniversary of the start of the smelting activity at Zamet by the Fryderyk Smelting Works. On 5 July 1988, the first secretary of the Provincial Committee of the Polish United Workers' Party, Manfred Gorywoda, made an economic visit to the plant.

To enhance the quality of production, Zamet cooperated with institutions such as the Silesian University of Technology in Gliwice, the AGH University of Krakow, the Institute of Iron Metallurgy, and the Institute of Non-Ferrous Metals, as well as design offices: Hutmaszprojekt, Biprohut, and Bipromet.

With the beginning of the 1990s, Zamet became part of the Famur Group as ZAMET Construction Machinery S.A. In 2004, the subsidiary in Bytom was incorporated into the company – a unit created based on the mechanical department of the former Zygmunt Iron Works.

In 2010, the plant was acquired by Pioma Industry S.A. from Piotrków Trybunalski. The transaction was worth 85 million PLN and resulted in the change of name to Zamet Industry Joint Stock Company. In 2013, ZAMET Construction Machinery S.A., Zamet Industry Joint Stock Company, and Mostostal Chojnice jointly formed the ZAMET Group.

== Production from 1787 to 1932 ==
The table below shows the production at the Fryderyk Smelting Works from 1787 to 1932. The largest production of a given material is indicated in bold.

Year	silver [kg]	lead [t]	lead monoxide [t]
1787	6	72	26
1788	343	287	162
1790	185	180	153
1795	367	372	219
1800	398	340	439
1810	324	167	512
1820	270	339	367
1830	222	131	380
1835	300	516	90
1840	274	177	406
1847	440	304	407
1850	418	522	154
1853	763	514	311
1860	853	487	723
1861	2,090	1,414	845
1862	4,016	2,973	323
1863	4,510	2,905	925
1865	5,000	4,113	732
1870	5,702	5,463	948
1875	7,753	7,379	1,145
1880	5,865	7,436	776
1882	5,245	8,683	1,077
1886	6,650	15,061	**1,697**
1890	6,837	15,700	1,660
1900	10,041	21,651	813
1905	**12,475**	**41,611**	658
1910	8,339	32,138	813
1913	8,111	34,350	1,065
1925	1,500	2,100	850
1926	10,000	17,000	200
1932	1,000	1,500	630

== Historic buildings ==
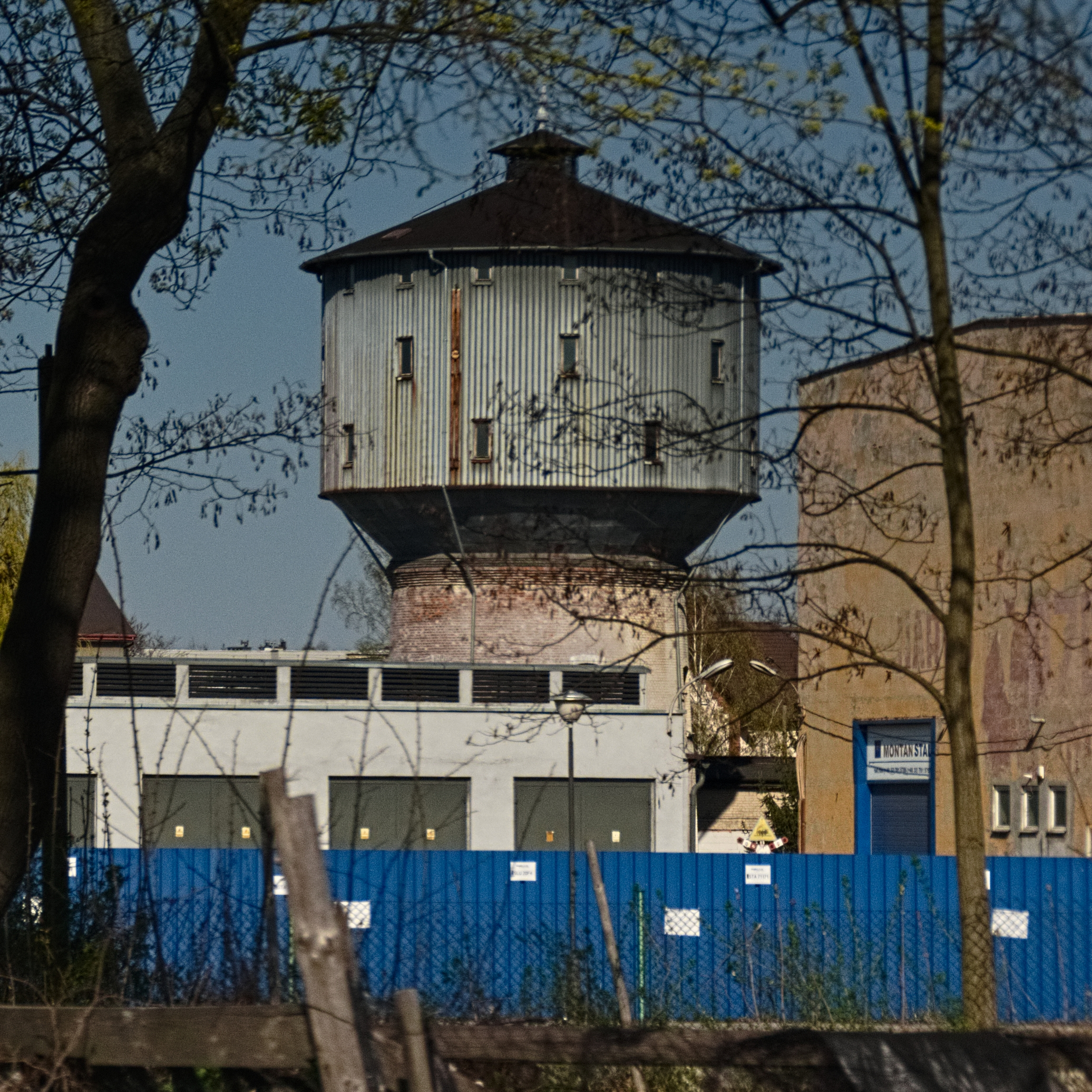
Post-smelting water tower at Zamet site (2019)

Two objects dating back to the expansion period of the plant in the early 20th century are now included in the Municipal Heritage Register:

- The building of the former factory hall;
- water tower.

== See also ==
- Historic Silver Mine in Tarnowskie Góry
