= Andrzej Sokołowski =

Polish handball player (born 1948)

Medal record

Men's Handball

Representing Poland

Olympic Games
Bronze medal – third place	1976 Montreal	Team

Andrzej Sokołowski (born 23 November 1948 in Komorzno, Kluczbork County) is a former Polish handball player who competed in the 1972 Summer Olympics and in the 1976 Summer Olympics.

In 1972 he was part of the Polish team which finished tenth. He played all five matches and scored one goal.

Four years later he won the bronze medal with the Polish team. He played all five matches and scored four goals.
