= Robert Wojsyk =

Polish footballer

Personal information
- Full name: Robert Wojsyk
- Date of birth: 11 September 1990 (age 36)
- Place of birth: Tarnowskie Góry, Poland
- Height: 1.85 m (6 ft 1 in)
- Position: Striker

Youth career
- 2005–2006: MLKS Woźniki
- 2006–2007: Polonia Bytom

Senior career*
Years	Team	Apps	(Gls)
2007–2011	Polonia Bytom (ME)	48	(14)
2008–2014	Polonia Bytom	36	(1)
2009–2010	→ GKS Tychy (loan)	3	(0)
2013	→ Rozwój Katowice (loan)	9	(0)
2014	MLKS Woźniki		
2015–2021	Ruch Radzionków		
2022–2023	Cyklon Rogoźnik	40	(28)
- * Club domestic league appearances and goals

Robert Wojsyk (born 11 September 1990) is a Polish former professional footballer who played as a striker.

== Honours ==
Ruch Radzionków

- IV liga Silesia I: 2014–15, 2017–18
