= DeeJay Delta =

Polish musician (born 1981)

Lukasz Zelezny
- Also known as: DeeJay Delta
- Born: Lukasz Zelezny; 23 March 1981 (age 44)
- Origin: Tarnowskie Góry, Poland
- Genres: Drum'n'bass neurofunk techstep
- Occupation: Disc Jockey
- Years active: 1998–present
- Labels: EMI Music; Technorganic
- Website: http://deejaydelta.com

Łukasz Żelezny, known as DeeJay Delta (born 23 March 1981 in Tarnowskie Góry, South Poland) is an electronic music artist, and disc jockey, currently living London. As a musician he works within the dark drum and bass genres like techstep, neurofunk. Before, he was a member of Amiga demoscene (1993–1998).

== Selected discography ==
- Hipnoza (CD); Fantom Flight Recordings 2004
- Rigour EP (CD, EP); Foundname Records 2004
- Witch Hunt (File, MP3); Combat Recordings (2) 2005
- Sidney Polak - Trzeci Wymiar (DeeJay Delta Remix); Emi Music 2005
