= Dowództwo Okręgu Korpusu =

Military district of the Second Polish Republic

A Dowództwo Okręgu Korpusu (DOK; English: Corps District Command) was a military district of the Ministry of Military Affairs of the Second Polish Republic. It served as an organizational, mobilisational, and administrative body of the Polish Army, and all of Poland's local military units were subject to the Corps Commands.

The DOKs also ran Poland's military draft offices. The system of DOKs was modeled after the French Army, and according to Polish planners, each district located along either the Soviet or German border was supposed to field one army. Thus all the districts except District X were subject to this rule.

The DOK borders did not reflect the administrative division of the Second Polish Republic.

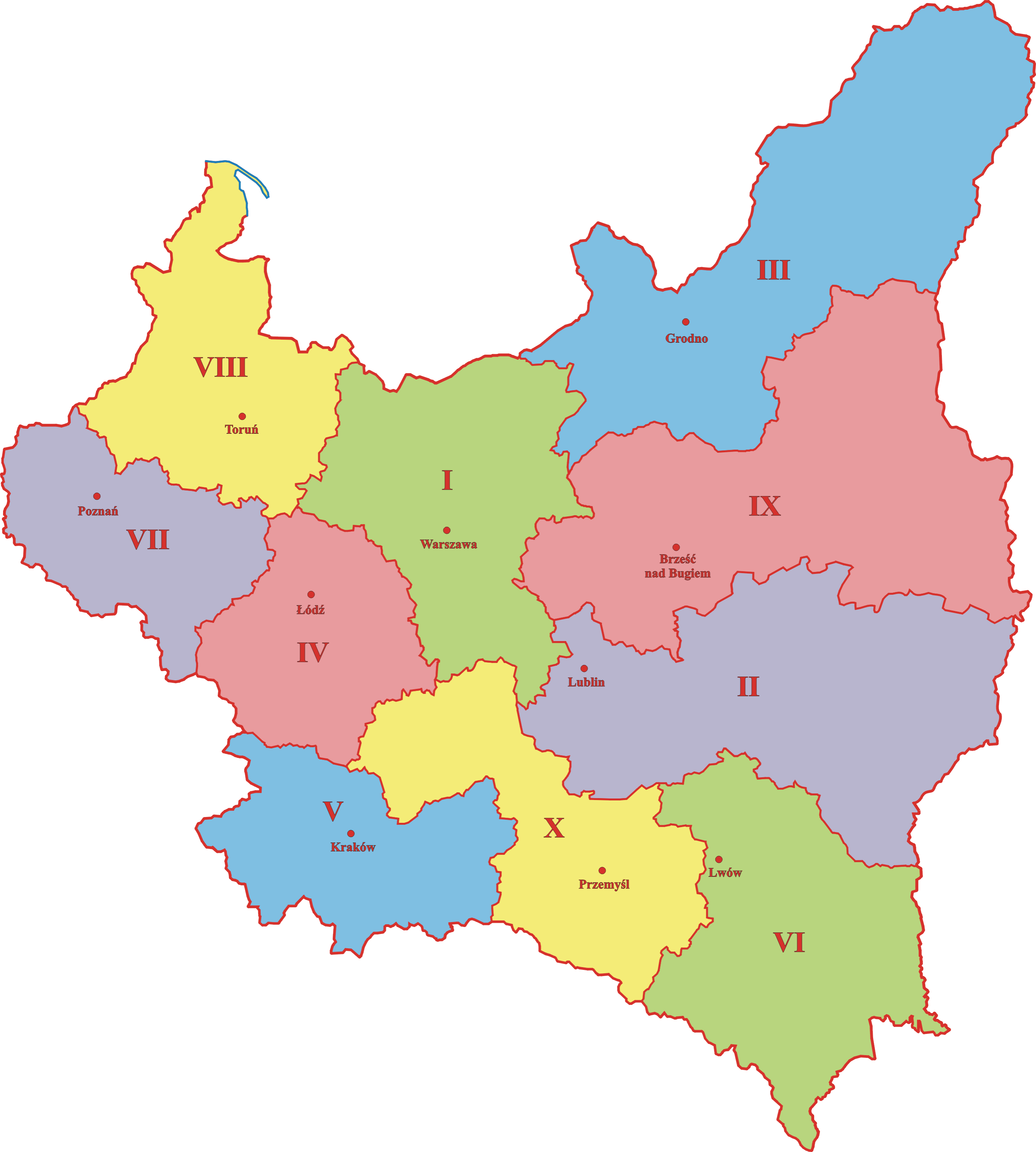
Map of Corps District Commands of Poland in 1939

== The districts ==
The interbellum Poland was since 1921 divided into ten Corps District Commands:

- Corps District Command number I (Warsaw, in 1939 under General Mieczysław Ryś-Trojanowski),
- Corps District Command number II (Lublin, General Mieczysław Smorawiński),
- Corps District Command number III (Grodno, General Józef Olszyna-Wilczyński),
- Corps District Command number IV (Łódź, General Wiktor Thommée),
- Corps District Command number V (Kraków, General Aleksander Narbutt-Łuczyński),
- Corps District Command number VI (Lwów, General Władysław Langner),
- Corps District Command number VII (Poznań, General Edmund Knoll-Kownacki),
- Corps District Command number VIII (Toruń, General Michał Karaszewicz-Tokarzewski),
- Corps District Command number IX (Brześć nad Bugiem, General Franciszek Kleeberg),
- Corps District Command number X (Przemyśl, General Wacław Wieczorkiewicz).

Furthermore, for military purposes, one special area was created, and it was not governed by the local Corps District Commands. It was Coastal Area of Gdynia (Obszar Nadmorski Gdynia), which, apart from the city of Gdynia itself, covered whole Polish Baltic Sea coastline, together with Puck, Władysławowo, Hel, Kartuzy, and Wejherowo. The Coastal Area of Gdynia was created in July 1937.

== Military units in districts ==
Each DOK consisted of three Infantry Divisions, one Cavalry Brigade (with the exception of District IV), a regiment of heavy artillery, a regiment of military engineers as well as additional units. Therefore:

- Corps District Command number I consisted of the 8th Infantry Division from Modlin, the 18th Infantry Division from Łomża, the 28th Infantry Division from Warsaw, Warsaw Armoured Motorized Brigade, and Mazowiecka Cavalry Brigade from Warsaw,
- Corps District Command number II consisted of the 3rd Legions Infantry Division from Zamość, the 13th Infantry Division from Rowne, the 27th Infantry Division from Kowel, and Wolynska Cavalry Brigade from Rowne,
- Corps District Command number III consisted of the 1st Legions Infantry Division from Wilno, the 19th Infantry Division from Wilno, the 29th Infantry Division from Grodno, Podlaska Cavalry Brigade from Białystok, Suwalska Cavalry Brigade from Suwałki, and Wilenska Cavalry Brigade from Wilno,
- Corps District Command number IV consisted of the 7th Infantry Division from Częstochowa, the 10th Infantry Division from Łódź, and the 26th Infantry Division from Skierniewice,
- Corps District Command number V consisted of the 6th Infantry Division from Kraków, the 21st Mountain Infantry Division from Nowy Sącz, the 23rd Infantry Division from Tarnowskie Góry, and Kraków Cavalry Brigade from Kraków,
- Corps District Command number VI consisted of the 5th Infantry Division from Lwów, the 11th Infantry Division from Stanisławów, the 12th Infantry Division from Tarnopol, Kresowa Cavalry Brigade from Brody, and Podolska Cavalry Brigade from Stanisławów,
- Corps District Command number VII consisted of the 14th Infantry Division from Poznań, the 17th Infantry Division from Gniezno, the 25th Infantry Division from Kalisz, and Wielkopolska Cavalry Brigade from Poznań,
- Corps District Command number VIII consisted of the 4th Infantry Division from Toruń, the 15th Infantry Division from Bydgoszcz, the 16th Infantry Division from Grudziądz, and Pomorska Cavalry Brigade from Bydgoszcz,
- Corps District Command number IX consisted of the 9th Infantry Division from Siedlce, the 20th Infantry Division from Baranowicze, the 30th Infantry Division from Kobryn, and Nowogródzka Cavalry Brigade from Baranowicze,
- Corps District Command number X consisted of the 2nd Legions Infantry Division from Kielce, the 22nd Mountain Infantry Division from Przemyśl, the 24th Infantry Division from Jarosław, and the 10th Motorized Cavalry Brigade from Rzeszów.

== Borders of the districts ==
- District I (Warsaw) covered Mazovia, and the area of Radom, with such cities, as Łomża, Mława, Działdowo, Płock, Sierpc, Wyszków, Ciechanów, Sokolow Podlaski, Garwolin, Dęblin, Radom, and Warsaw,
- District II (Lublin) covered the area of Lublin, and Volhynia, with such cities, as Lublin, Kraśnik, Janów Lubelski, Zamość, Chełm, Hrubieszów, Kowel, Wlodzimierz Wolynski, Lutsk, Dubno, Krzemieniec, Rowne, and Sarny,
- District III (Grodno) covered northern Białystok Voivodeship, and northeastern Poland, with such cites, as Grodno, Białystok, Suwałki, Grajewo, Lida, Molodeczno, Wilno, Dzisna, and Głębokie,
- District IV (Łódź) covered central Poland, with such cities, as Łódź, Kutno, Łowicz, Skierniewice, Tomaszów Mazowiecki, Końskie, Sieradz, Piotrków Trybunalski, Radomsko, and Częstochowa,
- District V (Kraków) covered southern Poland together with Zagłębie Dąbrowskie, and Upper Silesia, with such cites, as Kraków, Sosnowiec, Katowice, Lubliniec, Tarnowskie Góry, Chorzów, Cieszyn, Bogumin, Wadowice, Bielsko-Biała, Nowy Sącz, and Tarnów,
- District VI (Lwów), covered southeastern Poland, with such cities, as Lwów, Grodek Jagiellonski, Brody, Tarnopol, Stryj, Stanisławów, Kolomyja, Buczacz, and Czortków,
- District VII (Poznań) covered Greater Poland, with such cities, as Poznań, Leszno, Gniezno, Września, Krotoszyn, Ostrów Wielkopolski, Kalisz, and Koło,
- District VIII (Toruń) covered Polish Pomerania, and Kujavia, with such cites, as Toruń, Bydgoszcz, Inowrocław, Włocławek, Brodnica, Chojnica, Tuchola, Grudziądz, and Tczew,
- District IX (Brzesc nad Bugiem) covered southern Białystok Voivodeship, and Polesie, and the area of Nowogrodek, with such cites, as Brzesc, Siedlce, Biała Podlaska, Hajnówka, Kobryn, Pruzana, Slonim, Baranowicze, Luniniec, Stolin, Nowogrodek, and Stolpce,
- District X (Przemyśl) covered large part of Lesser Poland, with such cities, as Przemyśl, Rzeszów, Jarosław, Tarnobrzeg, Sandomierz, Kielce, and Ostrowiec Świętokrzyski.

== See also ==
- Polish army order of battle in 1939
- Polish contribution to World War II
- Military district
