= List of Polish divisions in World War II =

This is a list of Polish divisions in World War II.

== Polish divisions in September 1939 Campaign ==
- 1st Legions Infantry Division of Józef Piłsudski (stationed in Wilno) - Brig. Gen. Wincenty Kowalski
- 2nd Legions Infantry Division (stationed in Kielce) - Col. Edward Dojan-Surówka, after September 8, 1939 col. Antoni Staich
- 3rd Legions Infantry Division (stationed in Zamość) - Col. Marian Turowski
- 4th Toruń Infantry Division (stationed in Toruń) - Col. Tadeusz Lubicz-Niezabitowski, after September 4, 1939 Col. Mieczysław Rawicz-Mysłowski, after September 12 Col. Józef Werobej
- 5th Lwów Infantry Division (stationed in Lwów) - Gen. Juliusz Zulauf
- 6th Kraków Infantry Division (stationed in Kraków) - Gen. Bernard Mond
- 7th Częstochowa Infantry Division (stationed in Częstochowa) - Brig. Gen. Janusz Gąsiorowski
- 8th Infantry Division (stationed in Modlin) - Col. Tadeusz Wyrwa-Furgalski
- 9th Siedlce Infantry Division (stationed in Siedlce) - Col. Józef Werobej
- 10th Łódź Infantry Division (stationed in Łódź) -Gen. Franciszek Dindorf-Ankowicz
- 11th Carpathian Infantry Division (stationed in Stanisławów) - Col. Bronisław Prugar-Ketling
- 12th Tarnopol Infantry Division (stationed in Tarnopol) - Gen. Gustaw Paszkiewicz
- 13th Kresy Infantry Division (stationed in Równe) - Col. Władysław Zubosz-Kaliński
- 14th Greater Poland Infantry Division (stationed in Poznań) - Gen. Franciszek Wład
- 15th Greater Poland Infantry Division (stationed in Bydgoszcz) - Gen. Wacław Przyjałkowski
- 16th Pomeranian Infantry Division (stationed in Grudziądz) - Col. Stanisław Świtalski, after September 2, 1939 Col. Zygmunt Bohusz-Szyszko
- 17th Greater Poland Infantry Division (stationed in Gniezno) - Col. Mieczysław Stanisław Mozdyniewicz
- 18th Łomża Infantry Division (stationed in Łomża) - Col. Stefan Kossecki
- 19th Infantry Division (stationed in Wilno) - Gen. Józef Kwaciszewski
- 20th Infantry Division (stationed in Baranowicze) - Col. Wilhelm Liszka-Lawicz
- 21st Mountain Infantry Division (Poland) (stationed in Bielsko-Biała) - Gen. Józef Kustroń
- 22nd Mountain Infantry Division (Poland) (stationed in Przemyśl) - Col. Leopold Engel-Ragis
- 23rd Upper Silesian Infantry Division (stationed in Katowice) - Col. Władysław Powierza
- 24th Jarosław Infantry Division (stationed in Jarosław) - Col. Aleksander Krzyżanowski, after September 8, 1939 Col. Bolesław Schwarzenberg-Czerny
- 25th Kalisz Infantry Division (stationed in Kalisz) - Gen. Franciszek Alter
- 26th Skierniewice Infantry Division (stationed in Skierniewice) - Col. Adam Brzechwa-Ajdukiewicz
- 27th Kowel Infantry Division (stationed in Kowel) - Gen. Juliusz Drapella
- 28th Warsaw Infantry Division (stationed in Warsaw) - Gen. Władysław Bończa-Uzdowski
- 29th Grodno Infantry Division (stationed in Grodno) - Col. Ignacy Oziewicz
- 30th Polesie Infantry Division (stationed in Kobryń) - Gen. Leopold Cehak
- 33rd Reserve Infantry Division (stationed in Grodno) - Col. Tadeusz Kalina-Zieleniewski
- 35th Reserve Infantry Division (stationed in Wilno) - Col. Jarosław Szafran
- 36th Reserve Infantry Division (stationed in Czortków) - Col. Michał Ostrowski
- 38th Reserve Infantry Division (stationed in Łuniniec) - Col. Alojzy Wir-Konas
- 39th Reserve Infantry Division (stationed in Rembertów) - Gen. Bruno Olbrycht
- 41st Reserve Infantry Division (stationed in Ostrów Mazowiecka) - Gen. Wacław Piekarski
- 44th Reserve Infantry Division (stationed in Łowicz) - Col. Eugeniusz Żongołłowicz
- 45th Reserve Infantry Division (stationed in Kraków) - Gen. Henryk Krok-Paszkowski
- 50th Infantry Division „Brzoza” - Col. Ottokar Brzoza-Brzezina
- 55th Reserve Infantry Division (stationed in Będzin) - Col. Stanisław Kalabiński
- 60th Infantry Division 'Kobryń' - Col. Adam Epler
- Polish Cavalry Division 'Zaza' - Brig. Gen. Zygmunt Podhorski

== Polish divisions in France 1939–40 ==
- 1st Grenadier Division - Gen. Bronisław Duch
- 2nd Rifle Division - Gen. Bronisław Prugar-Ketling
- 3rd Infantry Division - Gen. Rudolf Dreszer
- 4th Infantry Division (Poland) - Col. Tadeusz Kalina-Zieleniewski
- Polish Independent Highland Brigade - Gen. Zygmunt Bohusz-Szyszko
- 10th Armoured Cavalry Brigade (10éme Brigade de cavalerie motorisée) - Gen. Stanisław Maczek
- Polish Independent Carpathian Rifle Brigade - Gen. Stanisław Kopański

== Polish divisions & brigades on the Western and Italian Fronts ==
- I Corps
  - 1st Armoured Division
  - 1st Independent Parachute Brigade
- II Corps
  - 3rd Carpathian Rifle Division
  - 5th Kresowa Infantry Division
  - 2nd Armoured Brigade

== Polish divisions on the Eastern Fronts ==
- First Polish Army
  - 1st Tadeusz Kościuszko Infantry Division
  - 2nd Infantry Division
  - 3rd Infantry Division
  - 4th Infantry Division
  - 6th Infantry Division
  - 1st Armoured Brigade "Westerplatte Heroes"
  - 1st Warsaw Cavalry Brigade
  - in addition:
    - Army artillery: 5 Artillery Brigades (1-5), 1st AA-Artillery Division, 1st mortar regiment
    - 1st Engineering Brigade
    - 4th independent heavy tank regiment
    - 13th SP-artillery regiment (SU-85 and ISU-152)
- Second Army (Poland)
  - 5th Infantry Division
  - 7th Infantry Division
  - 8th Infantry Division
  - 9th Infantry Division
  - 10th Infantry Division
  - 16th Armoured Brigade,
  - 2nd Artillery Division, 3rd AA-artillery Division, 3rd indep. mortar regiment
  - 3 AT-artillery brigades (nos.9,11,14)
  - 2nd Sapper Brigade
  - 4th independent heavy tank regiment
  - 28th SP-artillery regiment (21 x SU-85)
- 1st Armoured Corps: 3 armoured brigades, 1st Motorized Infantry Brigade - details below. Subordinated to the 2nd Army.
  - 1st Motorized Infantry Brigade (Polish)(East)
  - 2nd Armoured Brigade (2. Brygada Pancerna) - (65 x T-34/85)
  - 3rd Armoured Brigade
  - 4th Armoured Brigade
  - 24th SP-artillery regiment (21 x SU-85)
  - 25th SP-artillery regiment (21 x ISU-122)
  - 27th SP-artillery regiment (21 x SU-76M)
  - 2nd mortar regiment
  - 26th AA-artillery regiment
  - Rocket artillery battalion

== Polish divisions of the underground armies ==
- Home Army - brigade or division-sized units only
  - 2nd Home Army Infantry Division (Poland) (Kielce-Radom)
  - Polish 8th Home Army Infantry Division (Warsaw Uprising)
  - 19th Home Army Infantry Division (Poland) (Wilno)
  - 27th Home Army Infantry Division (Poland) (Wołyń)
  - Cracovian Home Army Infantry Division
  - Cracovian Home Army Cavalry Brigade
- National Armed Forces

== See also ==
- Military history of Poland during World War II
- History of Poland (1939–1945)
