= Seventh Legion =

7th Legion may refer to:

- 7th Legion (video game)
- Legio VII Claudia, a legion of the Imperial Roman army founded in Spain in 65 BC
- Legio VII Gemina, a legion of the Imperial Roman army founded in AD 68 in Spain
- 7th Legions' Infantry Regiment, an infantry regiment in the interwar Polish army
- Sétima Legião, a Portuguese rock band named after the Roman Seventh Legion
