= Battle of Brzostowica =

Battle during the Polish Soviet war

- Part of Polish–Soviet War
Date	20–25 September 1920
Location	Brzostowica Wielka
Result	Polish victory

Belligerents
Poland	Russian SFSR

Commanders and leaders
General Leon Berbecki	General August Kork

Units involved
3rd Legions Infantry Division	15th Army

Strength
7,800 soldiers	11,000 soldiers

Casualties and losses
223 killed, 1149 wounded	1,000 killed, 2,100 POWs

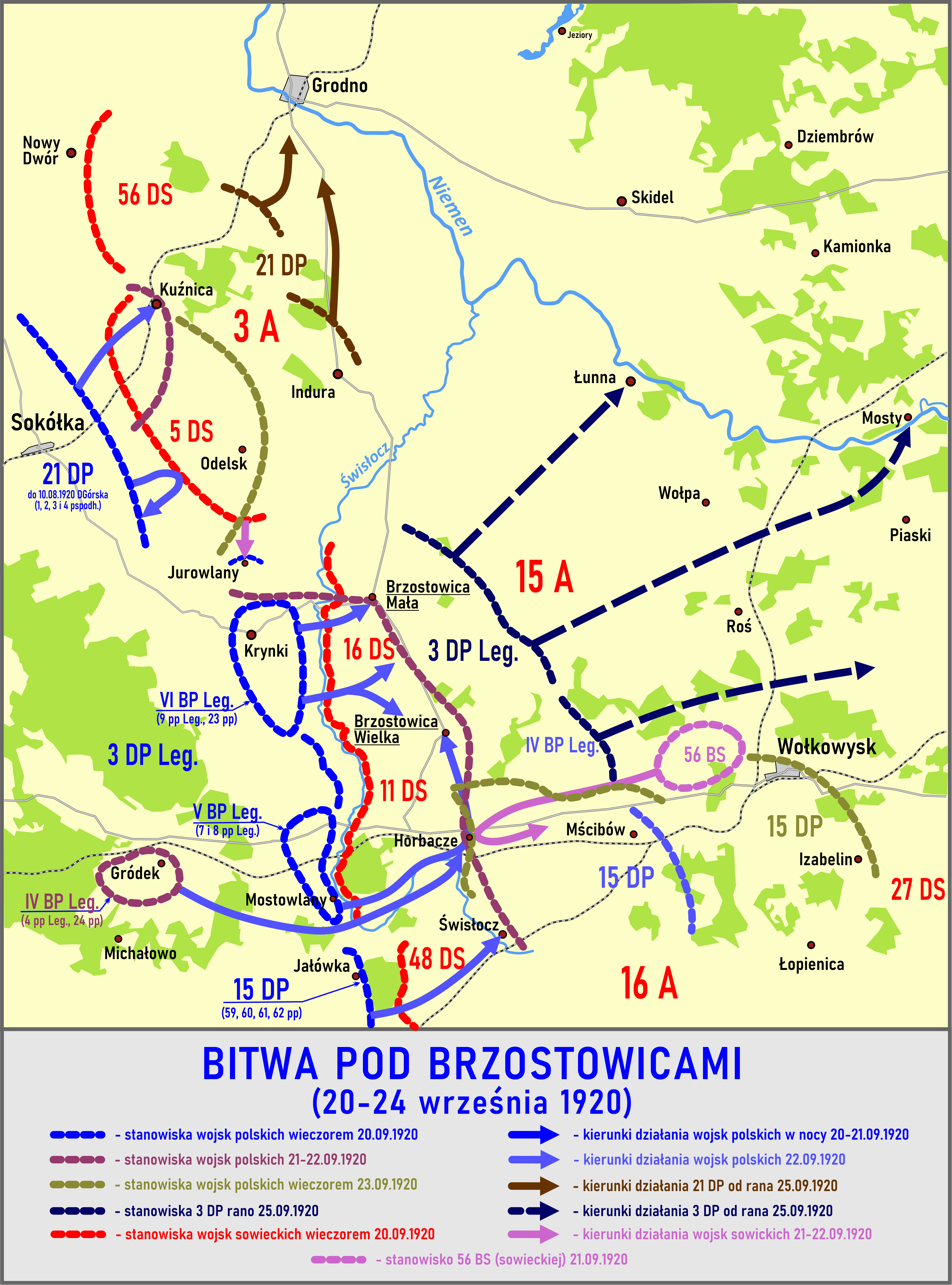
Battle of Brzostowice (September 20-24, 1920)

The Battle of Brzostowica took place on 20–25 September 1920, during the Polish-Soviet War. Polish 3rd Legions Infantry Division, commanded by General Leon Berbecki, clashed with units of the Soviet 15th Army (General August Kork). The Battle of Brzostowica took place in initial stages of the much larger Battle of the Niemen River.

On 20 September 1920, 3rd Legions Infantry Division, which was located on the right wing of Polish Second Army, was ordered to move its main forces to the area of villages of Brzostowica Wielka and Brzostowica Mala. On the second day of the planned Polish offensive, the division was to attack along the axis Brzostowica Wielka - Zaniemiensk, in order to capture bridges over the Niemen river, in Zaniemiensk and Lunna Wola, and create bridgeheads on the eastern bank. Furthermore, it was ordered to capture the rail junction at Mosty, and then to march towards Lida.

The 3rd Legions Infantry Division had 7800 soldiers, 41 cannons and 215 heavy machine guns. Morale of the soldiers was very high, as Polish Army was on the offensive. Facing it was Soviet 15th Army of General Kork, with two rifle divisions (11th and 16th), altogether 11,000 soldiers and 60 cannons. In mid-September, Soviet forces in this area were reinforced with highly motivated Communists from St. Petersburg.

On 20 September two Polish regiments (commanded by Władysław Bończa-Uzdowski and Wacław Scaevola-Wieczorkiewicz) began their assault on the 11th Soviet Rifle Division. At first Polish offensive was a success, but in the course of time, Soviet resistance hardened. By evening, Polish regiments were halted, unable to seize Brzostowica Wielka before the night.

In the morning of 21 September, 6th Legions Brigade surprised Soviet 16th Rifle Division, and captured all villages, except for Brzostowica Mala. Soon it was joined by 9th Legions Regiment and 7th Legions Regiment. Near Brzostowica Wielka, the Poles surprised the headquarters of the 11th Rifle Division, wounding its commandant, and capturing 300 prisoners. This paralyzed the division, which since then was unable to operate in a cohesive way.

In the afternoon, the 3rd Legions Division regrouped and concentrated its main forces at Brzostowica Wielka. Fighting continued until the evening, when General Kork ordered Soviet 56th Rifle Brigade (3,000 soldiers, 54 heavy machine guns) to join the forces near Brzostowica. The well-rested and well-equipped brigade was placed on the right wing of Soviet forces, as Kork wanted to regain the positions along the Swislocz river.

The third day of the battle began with stubborn Soviet attacks. The enemy, whose forces were much stronger than Polish, recaptured the villages of Menki and Brzostowiczany. Near the road toward Wolkowysk, Soviet 56th Rifle Brigade entered the fray, attacking Polish 7th Legions Infantry Regiment. The Soviets managed to get into Polish trenches, only to retreat after Polish reinforcements had been called.

At 6 p.m., after artillery barrage, Soviet 33rd Rifle Brigade attacked the Poles, but due to concentrated Polish fire, it suffered heavy losses and returned to the starting positions. Soon afterwards, Polish lines were broken near Brzostowica Mala, where 9th Legions Infantry Regiment, attacked by Soviet forces, retreated five kilometers back, towards Swislocz. At the same time, 23rd Infantry Regiment, which was located north of the 9th Regiment, managed to keep its positions, and Colonel Wladyslaw Boncza-Uzdowski prepared a counterattack, using 5th Legions Infantry Brigade. Since other Polish units joined the attack, by 6 p.m. the Soviets were in full retreat.

On the morning of 23 September General Berbecki ordered his men to capture bridges over the Niemen. The assault at first surprised the Soviets, but in the course of the time their resistance stiffened, and the Poles had to return to their starting positions. In late afternoon, a bloody battle for the folwark of Stanislawow took place. In a desperate attempt, Boncza-Uzdowski threw all his forces into the fray, and by midnight, Poles reached the line Masalany - Sedejki - Werejki.

On 24 September the Soviets carried out several counterattacks, trying to push the enemy behind the Swislocz river. All these attempts failed due to accurate fire of Polish artillery. Soviet losses were very high, and by 25 September they began to retreat. In the evening of that day, 6th Legions Infantry Brigade captured the bridge at Lunna Wola, and soon afterwards, partially destroyed rail bridge at Zaniemiensk was seized by 5th Legions Infantry Brigade.

Total Polish losses during the Battle of Brzostowica were 223 killed, 1,149 wounded and unknown number of missing. The Soviets lost app. 1,000 killed, thousands were wounded and 2100 captured, together with 7 cannons and 40 heavy machine guns. The Battle of Brzostowica is commemorated on the Tomb of the Unknown Soldier, Warsaw, with the inscription "BRZOSTOWICE 20 IX 1920".
