= 7th Legions' Infantry Regiment =

- 7 Pułk Piechoty Legionów
- Active: 1918–1939
- Country: Second Polish Republic
- Branch: Polish Army
- Type: Infantry
- Size: Regiment
- Part of: 3rd Legions Infantry Division
- Garrison/HQ: Chełm, formerly Ostrów Mazowiecka
- Engagements: Polish–Soviet War, Invasion of Poland

Commanders
- Notable commanders: Karol Udalowski, Stanisław Dąbek

Insignia
- Regimental badge (approved 1928): Cross badge with 1916 Eagle and initials "7 PPL"

7th Legions' Infantry Regiment (Polish: 7 Pułk Piechoty Legionów; abbreviated 7 pp Leg.) was an interwar Polish Army infantry regiment that existed from 1918 until 1939. Garrisoned first in Ostrów Mazowiecka and then in Chełm, it was part of the 3rd Legions Infantry Division.

The regiment was formed on May 1, 1918, in the centers of Polish Armed Forces (1917–1918) at Ostrów Mazowiecka and Zegrze. The new unit, which at that time was called 1st Infantry Regiment consisted of three infantry battalions and a company of machine guns. In November 1918, its soldiers disarmed German garrisons of Warsaw, Ostrów Mazowiecka and Malkinia. In early February 1919, the regiment was renamed the 7th Legions Infantry Regiment, to fight in the Polish–Soviet War.

In the Second Polish Republic, the 7th Legions Infantry Regiment was stationed in the garrison of Chełm, as part of the 3rd Legions Infantry Division. On September 24, 1933, during a special ceremony attended by President Ignacy Mościcki and General Felicjan Sławoj Składkowski, a monument dedicated to the soldiers of the regiment killed in the wars of 1918–1920 was unveiled in Chełm.

== Commandants ==
- Colonel Karol Udalowski (1 V 1918 – 16 III 1920)
- Colonel Zdzislaw Mackowski (since 17 VII 1920)
- Colonel Michal Micewicz
- Colonel Mieczyslaw Wieckowski (XI 1925 – † 13 V 1926)
- Colonel Stanislaw Borowiec (X 1926 – VI 1930)
- Colonel Stanislaw Dabek (VI 1930–1937)
- Colonel Wladyslaw Muzyka

== Symbols ==
On September 22, 1921, in Pabradė, the anniversary of the Battle of Brzostowica, Colonel Władysław Bończa-Uzdowski handed the flag to the regiment. It was funded by the Landowners' Association of the Chełm Land, and the ceremony was attended by Bishop Władysław Bandurski.

The badge, approved in 1928, was in the shape of the cross, with the 1916 Eagle of the Polish Legions and the initials 7 PPL.

== Sources ==
- Satora, Kazimierz (1990). Opowieści wrześniowych sztandarów (in Polish). Warsaw: Instytut Wydawniczy Pax.
- Zdzisław, Jagiełło (2007). Piechota Wojska Polskiego 1918–1939 (in Polish). Warsaw: Bellona.

== See also ==
- 1939 Infantry Regiment (Poland)
