= Battle of the Bzura =

Battle of World War II in Poland

- Part of Invasion of Poland, World War II
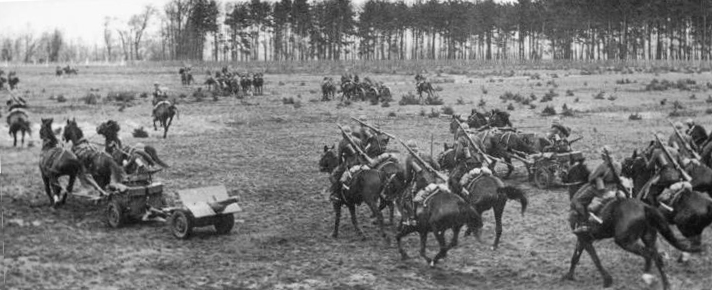
- Polish cavalry brigade "Wielkopolska" during the battle
Date	9–19 September 1939
Location	Near Kutno, Łódź Voivodeship, Poland 52°14′00″N 19°22′00″E
Result	German victory: Destruction of the Poznań and Pomeranian Armies

Belligerents
Germany	Poland

Commanders and leaders
(Nazi Germany) Gerd von Rundstedt (Nazi Germany) Johannes Blaskowitz (Nazi Germany) Walther von Reichenau (Nazi Germany) Günther von Kluge (Nazi Germany) Wilhelm Ulex (Nazi Germany) Wilhelm Ritter von Leeb (Nazi Germany) Erich Hoepner	(Second Polish Republic) Tadeusz Kutrzeba (Second Polish Republic) Władysław Bortnowski (Second Polish Republic) Edmund Knoll-Kownacki (Second Polish Republic) Mikołaj Bołtuć (Second Polish Republic) Roman Abraham (Second Polish Republic) Stanisław Grzmot-Skotnicki † (Second Polish Republic) Franciszek Wład † (Second Polish Republic) Leon Strzelecki

Strength
12 infantry divisions 5 armoured and motorized divisions 425,000 soldiers	8 infantry divisions 2–4 cavalry brigades 225,000 soldiers

Casualties and losses
8,000 dead 4,000 captured 50 tanks 100 cars 20 artillery pieces	18,000–20,000 dead 32,000 wounded 170,000 captured

The Battle of the Bzura (or the Battle of Kutno) was the largest battle of the German invasion of Poland and was fought from 9 to 19 September 1939. It was a Polish counter-attack against the Germans.

The battle took place west of Warsaw, near the Bzura River. It began as a Polish counter-offensive and achieved some initial success, but it faltered as the Germans ultimately outflanked the Polish forces with a concentrated counter-attack, which significantly weakened the Polish forces and resulted in the destruction of the Poznań and Pomorze Armies. The conclusion of the battle marked the completion of the German occupation of Western Poland.

== Background ==
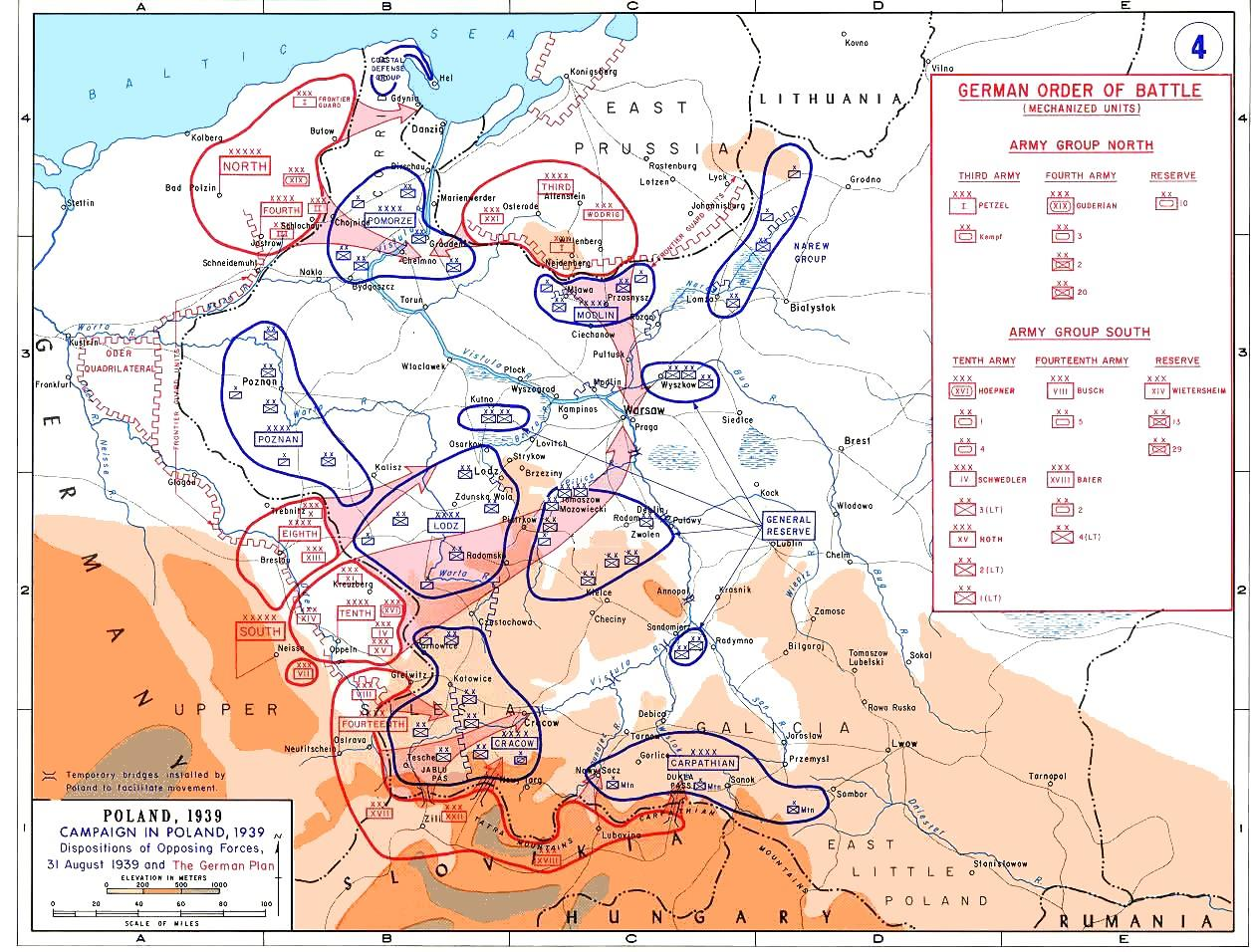
Dispositions of opposing forces, 31 August 1939, and the German plan.

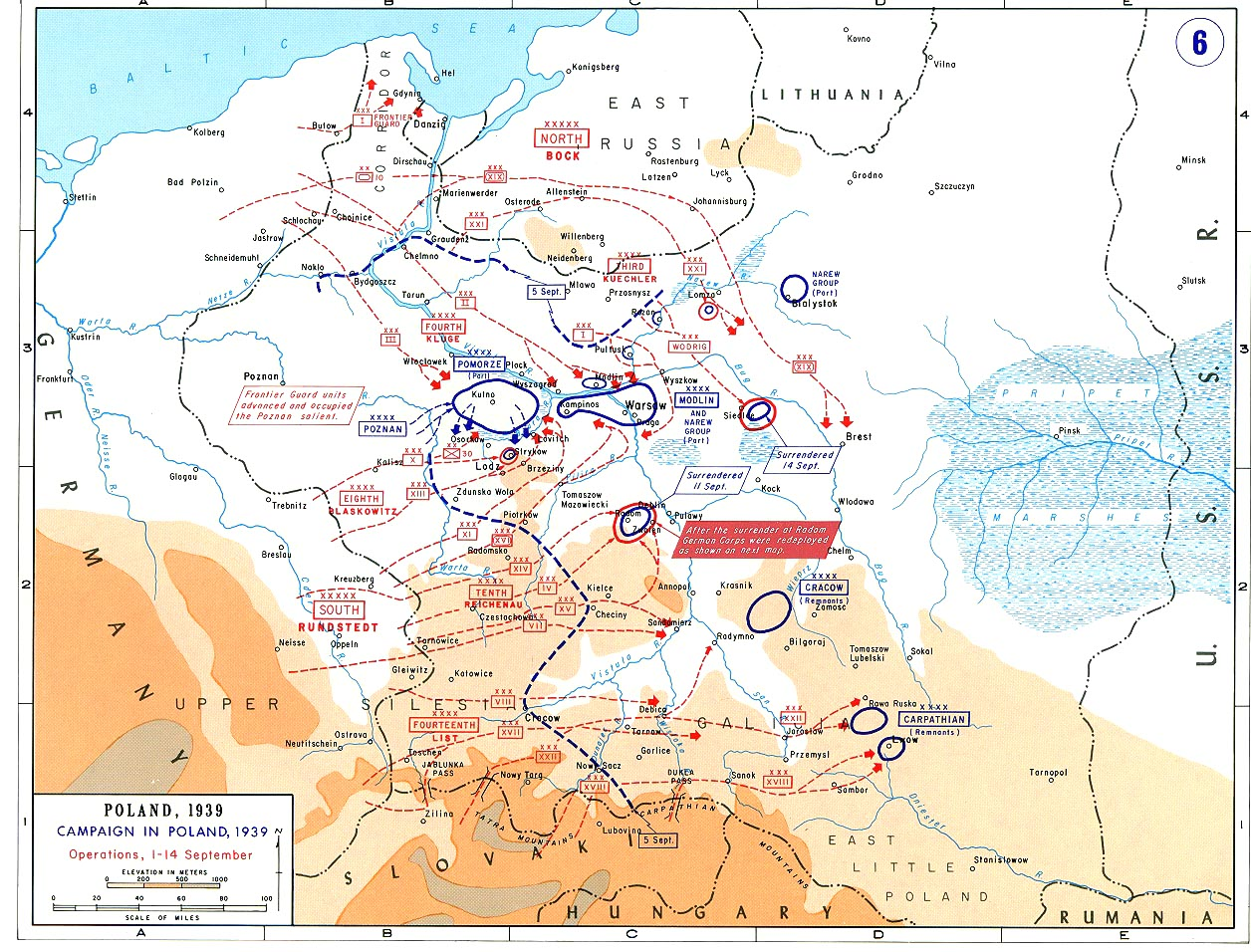
Map showing the Polish assault southwards

The Polish plan to defend from the German invasion, Plan West, called for the defence of the borders. This strategy was dictated more by political than military concerns, as the Poles feared that the Germans, after they had taken over the territories that they had lost by the Treaty of Versailles, would try to end the war by retaining those territories. Defending the borders was risky, but the Poles were counting on a British and French counteroffensive, which never came. As a result, Army Pomorze, under General Władysław Bortnowski, found itself surrounded in the Polish Corridor by German forces on two fronts. Army Poznań, under General Tadeusz Kutrzeba, was pushed to the westernmost fringes of Poland and was separated from its primary defensive positions and from other Polish Armies.

The German offensive proved the folly of the Polish border defence plan during the first days of the war. Army Pomorze was defeated at the Battle of Bory Tucholskie and was forced to retreat to the south-east. Army Poznań, meanwhile, did not face heavy German assaults but was forced to retreat to the east by defeats of its neighbours (Army Pomorze in the north and Army Łódź in the south). Both of them were retreating and so Army Poznań was in danger of being flanked and surrounded by the German forces. On 4 September, Army Poznań moved through Poznań and abandoned it to the enemy although at that point, it was not in contact with any significant German forces. By 6 September, Armies Pomorze and Poznań had linked and formed the strongest Polish operational unit in the campaign, and General Bortnowski accepted the command of General Kutrzeba.

On 7 September, the Polish forces became aware of the German push towards Łęczyca, which, if successful, could cut off the retreat route of Polish forces. By 8 September, advanced German troops reached Warsaw, which marked the beginning of the Siege of Warsaw. At the same time, German forces had lost contact with Army Poznań, and the German command assumed that the army must have been transported by rail to aid Warsaw's defence. They were unaware that in fact Army Poznań had merged forces with Army Pomorze, which they considered, since its defeat at Bory Tucholskie, to be no longer a significant threat. On 8 September, the Germans were certain that they had eliminated major Polish resistance west of the Vistula and so prepared to cross it and to engage the Polish forces on the other side.

Meanwhile, General Kutrzeba and his staff officers had suspected, even before the German invasion, that it would be the neighbouring armies that would bear the German attack and so they had developed plans for an offensive to the south to relieve Army Łódź. During the first week of the campaign, however, those plans were rejected by the Polish commander-in-chief, Marshal Edward Rydz-Śmigły. By 8 September, Kutrzeba had lost contact with Rydz-Śmigły, who had relocated his command center from Warsaw to Brest. Those factors made Kutrzeba decide to go forward with his plan. His situation was dire, as German forces were close to surrounding his units: the German 8th Army had secured the southern bank of the Bzura river, and the German 4th Army had secured the northern bank of the Vistula, from Włocławek to Wyszogród, and its elements were attacking the rear of the Armies Pomorze and Poznań from the direction of Inowrocław and crossing the Vistula near Płock.

== Opposing forces ==
The Polish forces consisted of Army Poznań and Army Pomorze. The German forces included the 8th Army under Johannes Blaskowitz and 10th Army under Walther von Reichenau of Army Group South (Heeresgruppe Süd), elements of the 4th Army under Günther von Kluge of the Army Group North (Heeresgruppe Nord) and air support (Luftflotte 1 and Luftflotte 4).

Polish

	Division or Brigade	Regiments
Army Poznań Kutrzeba	Wielkopolska Cavalry Brigade; Abraham	15th Uhlan Regiment; 17th Uhlan Regiment; 7th Mounted Rifles Regiment
Army Poznań Kutrzeba	Podolska Cavalry Brigade; Strzelecki	6th Uhlan Regiment; 9th Uhlan Regiment; 14th Uhlan Regiment elements of Pomorska Cavalry Brigade
Army Poznań Kutrzeba	14th Infantry Division; Wład	55th Infantry Regiment; 57th Infantry Regiment; 58th Infantry Regiment
Army Poznań Kutrzeba	17th Infantry Division; Mozdyniewicz	68th Infantry Regiment; 69th Infantry Regiment; 70th Infantry Regiment
Army Poznań Kutrzeba	25th Infantry Division; Alter	29th Infantry Regiment; 56th Infantry Regiment; 60th Infantry Regiment
Army Poznań Kutrzeba	26th Infantry Division; Brzechwa-Ajdukiewicz	10th Infantry Regiment; 18th Infantry Regiment; 37th Infantry Regiment
Army Pomorze Bortnowski	4th Infantry Division; Lubicz-Niezabitowski	14th Infantry Regiment; 63rd Infantry Regiment; 67th Infantry Regiment
Army Pomorze Bortnowski	15th Infantry Division; Przyjałkowski	59th Infantry Regiment; 61st Infantry Regiment; 62nd Infantry Regiment
Army Pomorze Bortnowski	16th Infantry Division; Bohusz-Szyszko	64th Infantry Regiment; 65th Infantry Regiment; 66th Infantry Regiment
Army Pomorze Bortnowski	27th Infantry Division; Drapella	23rd Infantry Regiment; 24th Infantry Regiment; 50th Infantry Regiment

German

	Corps	Division or Brigade	Regiments
8th Army Blaskowitz	X Corps Ulex	24th Infantry Division; Olbricht	31st Infantry Regiment; 32nd Infantry Regiment; 102nd Infantry Regiment
8th Army Blaskowitz	X Corps Ulex	30th Infantry Division von Briesen	6th Infantry Regiment; 26th Infantry Regiment; 46th Infantry Regiment
8th Army Blaskowitz	XIII Corps von Weichs	10th Infantry Division von Cochenhausen	20th Infantry Regiment; 41st Infantry Regiment; 85th Infantry Regiment
8th Army Blaskowitz	XIII Corps von Weichs	17th Infantry Division; Loch	21st Infantry Regiment; 55th Infantry Regiment; 95th Infantry Regiment
8th Army Blaskowitz	XIII Corps von Weichs		SS Leibstandarte "Adolf Hitler"; Dietrich.
10th Army Reichenau	XI Corps Leeb	18th Infantry Division; Cranz	30th Infantry Regiment; 51st Infantry Regiment; 54th Infantry Regiment
10th Army Reichenau	XI Corps Leeb	19th Infantry Division; Schwantes	59th Infantry Regiment; 73rd Infantry Regiment; 74th Infantry Regiment
10th Army Reichenau	XVI Corps Hoepner	1st Panzer Division; Schmidt	1st Panzer Regiment; 2nd Panzer Regiment; 1st Infantry Regiment
10th Army Reichenau	XVI Corps Hoepner	4th Panzer Division; Reinhardt	35th Panzer Regiment; 36th Panzer Regiment; 12th Infantry Regiment
10th Army Reichenau	XVI Corps Hoepner	14th Infantry Division; Weyer	11th Infantry Regiment; 53rd Infantry Regiment; 116th Infantry Regiment
10th Army Reichenau	XVI Corps Hoepner	31st Infantry Division; Kämpfe	12th Infantry Regiment; 17th Infantry Regiment; 82nd Infantry Regiment
10th Army Reichenau	XV Corps Hoth
10th Army Reichenau	XV Corps Hoth	2nd Light Division; Stumme	25th Panzer Regiment; 6th Mechanized Cavalry Regiment; 7th Mechanized Cavalry Regiment
10th Army Reichenau	XV Corps Hoth	3rd Light Division; Kuntzen	10th Panzer Regiment; 8th Mechanized Cavalry Regiment; 9th Mechanized Cavalry Regiment
4th Army Kluge	II Corps Strauß	3rd Infantry Division; Lichel	8th Infantry Regiment; 29th Infantry Regiment; 50th Infantry Regiment
4th Army Kluge	II Corps Strauß	32nd Infantry Division; Böhme	4th Infantry Regiment; 94th Infantry Regiment; 96th Infantry Regiment
4th Army Kluge	III Corps Haase
4th Army Kluge	III Corps Haase	50th Infantry Division; Sorsche	121st Infantry Regiment; 122nd Infantry Regiment; 123rd Infantry Regiment
4th Army Kluge	III Corps Haase	Netze Infantry Brigade; Gablenz
Wehrmacht Reserves		208th Infantry Division; Andreas	309th Infantry Regiment; 337th Infantry Regiment; 338th Infantry Regiment
Wehrmacht Reserves		213th Infantry Division; Courbiere	318th Infantry Regiment; 354th Infantry Regiment; 406th Infantry Regiment
Wehrmacht Reserves		221st Infantry Division; Pflugbeil	350th Infantry Regiment; 360th Infantry Regiment; 375th Infantry Regiment
Luftwaffe Göring	1st Air Fleet Kesselring
Luftwaffe Göring	4th Air Fleet Lohr

== Battle ==
The battle can be divided into three phases:

- Phase I – Polish offensive towards Stryków, aiming at the flank of the German 10th Army (9–12 September)
- Phase II – Polish offensive towards Łowicz (13–15 September)
- Phase III – German counterattack and eventual defeat of the Poles, who withdraw towards Warsaw and

Modlin (16–19 September)

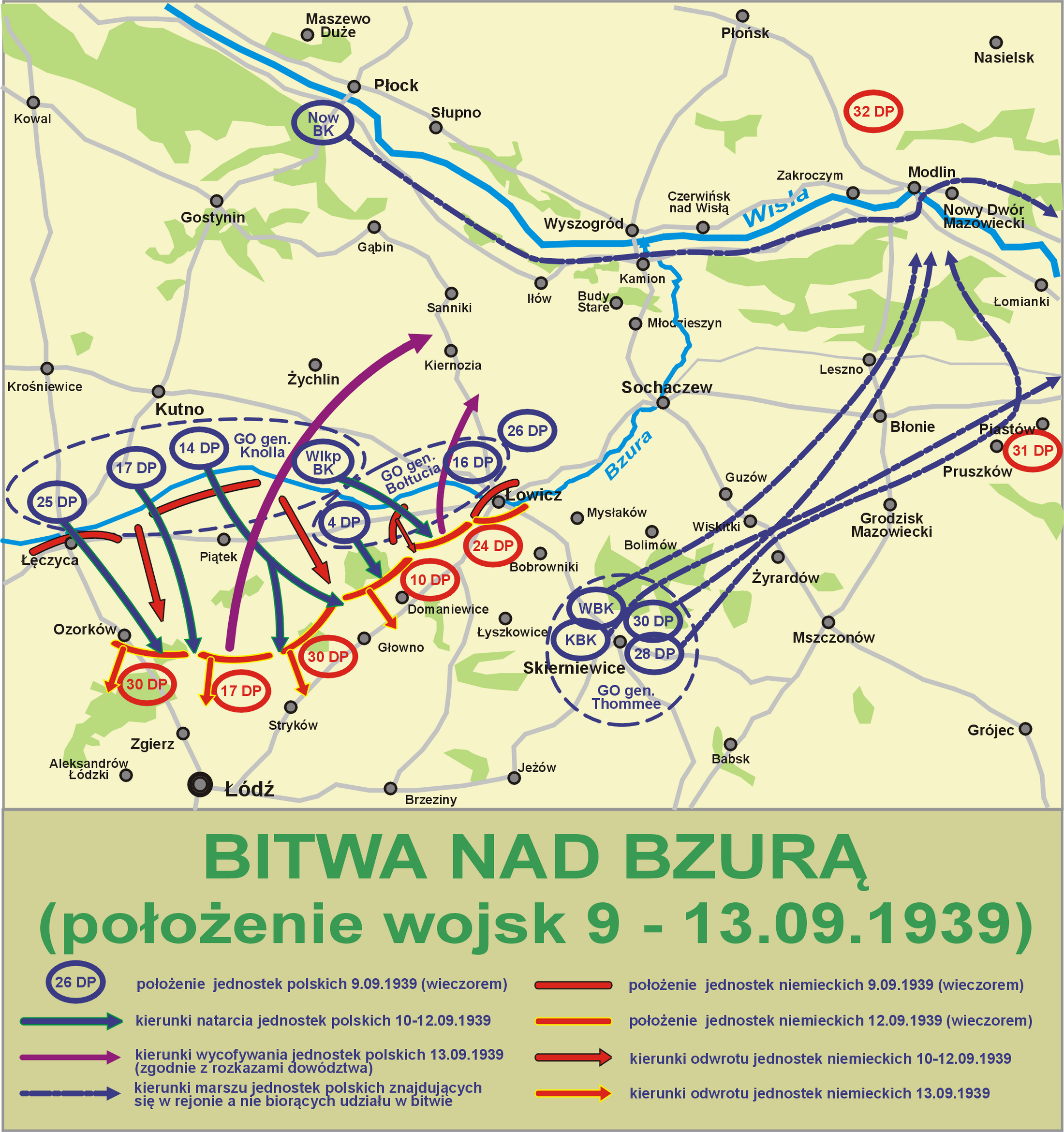
First phase of the battle

On the night of 9 September, the Polish Poznań Army commenced a counterattack from the south of the Bzura river, its target being the German forces from the 8th Army advancing between Łęczyca and Łowicz towards Stryków. The commander of Poznań Army, Tadeusz Kutrzeba noticed that the German 8th Army, which was commanded by General Johannes Blaskowitz, was weakly secured from the north by only the 30th Infantry Division, which stretched over a 30 km defensive line while the rest of the army was advancing towards Warsaw. The main thrust of the Polish offensive were the units under General Edmund Knoll-Kownacki, which were known as the Knoll-Kownacki Operational Group (Polish 14th, 17th, 25th and 26th Infantry Divisions). The right wing of the offensive, in the area Łęczyce, included the Podolska Cavalry Brigade under Col. L. Strzelecki, and on the left, advancing from Łowicz to the area of Głowno, the Wielkopolska Cavalry Brigade under General Roman Abraham. These groups inflicted considerable losses on the German defenders from the 30th Infantry Division and the 24th Infantry Division, with some 1,500 German soldiers killed or wounded and an additional 3,000 lost as prisoners during the initial push. The cavalry brigades, supplemented with TKS and TK-3 reconnaissance tanks, moved to threaten the flanks and the rear of the advancing German units.

The German forces were thrown back approximately 20 km, and the Poles recaptured several towns, including Łęczyca and Piątek, and the village of Góra Świętej Małgorzaty. On 10 September, the Polish 17th Infantry Division met the German 17th Infantry Division at Małachowicze. The following day, Polish forces continued their attack and advanced on Modlna, Pludwiny, Osse and Głowno.

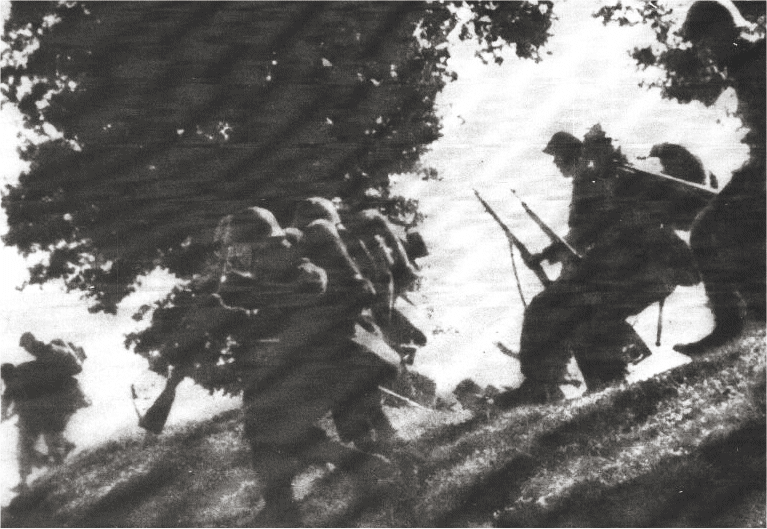
Polish 18th Infantry Regiment advancing during the battle

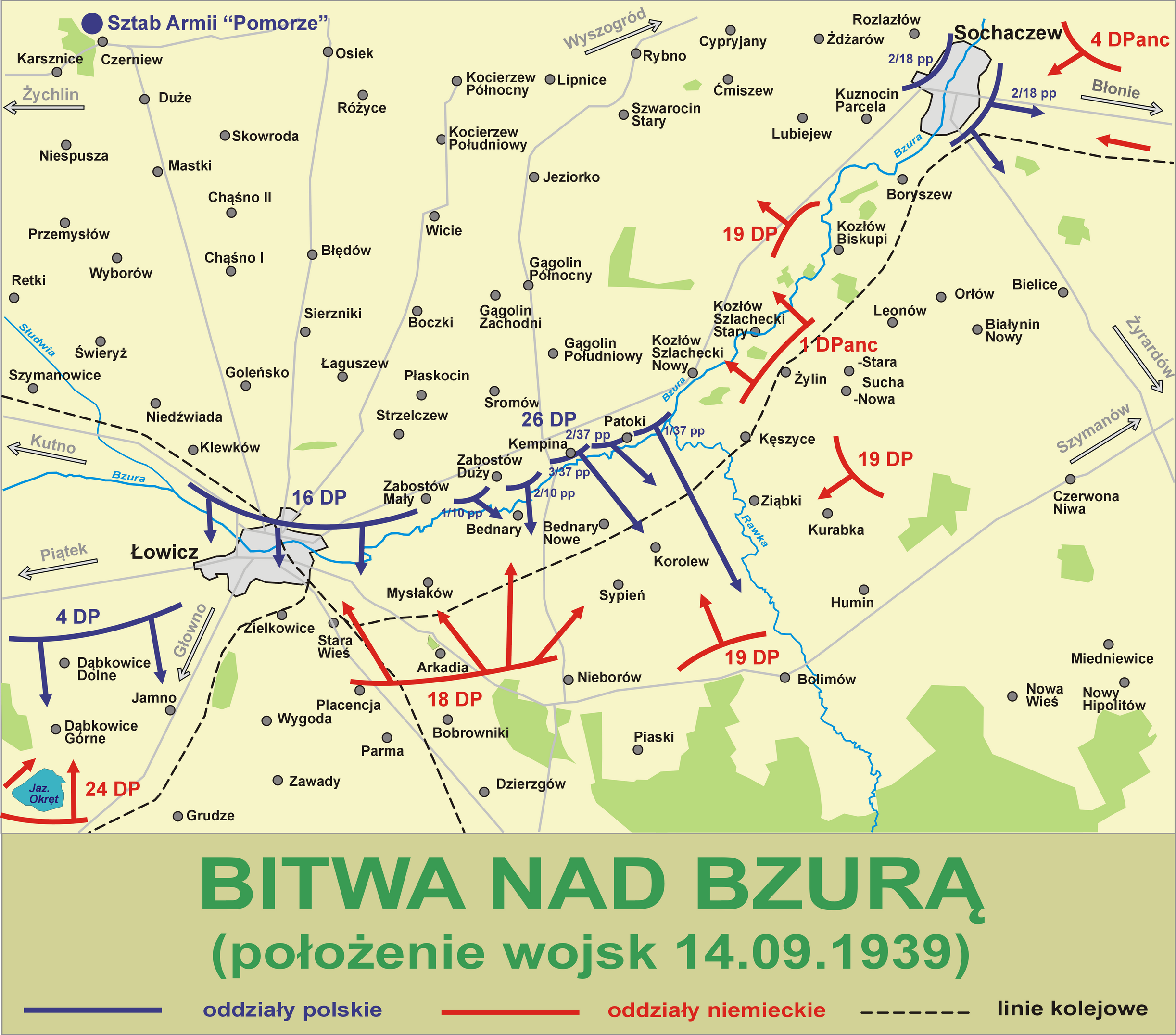
Second phase of the battle

Initially underestimating the Polish advance, the Germans decided on 11 September to redirect the main force of the German 10th Army, the German 4th Army, the reserves of the Army Group South and aircraft from 4th Air Fleet towards the Bzura. The forces included the German 1st Panzer Division, German 4th Panzer Division and the newly-formed SS Infantry regiment Leibstandarte Adolf Hitler. German air superiority had a significant impact by making it very costly and difficult for the Poles to move units during the day. The following day, the Poles reached the line Stryków-Ozorków. That day, General Tadeusz Kutrzeba learned that units of Army Łódź had retreated to the Modlin Fortress and decided to stop the offensive and instead sought to try to break through Sochaczew and the Kampinos Forest to reach Warsaw.

On the morning of 14 September, General Władysław Bortnowski's 26th and 16th Infantry Divisions crossed the Bzura near Łowicz. The Polish 4th Infantry Division reached the road linking Łowicz with Głowno. At that point, however, Bortnowski ordered the 26th Infantry Division to retreat. He had learned of the withdrawal of the German 4th Panzer Division from the outskirts of Warsaw and was concerned that the Panzer division posed a threat to his men.

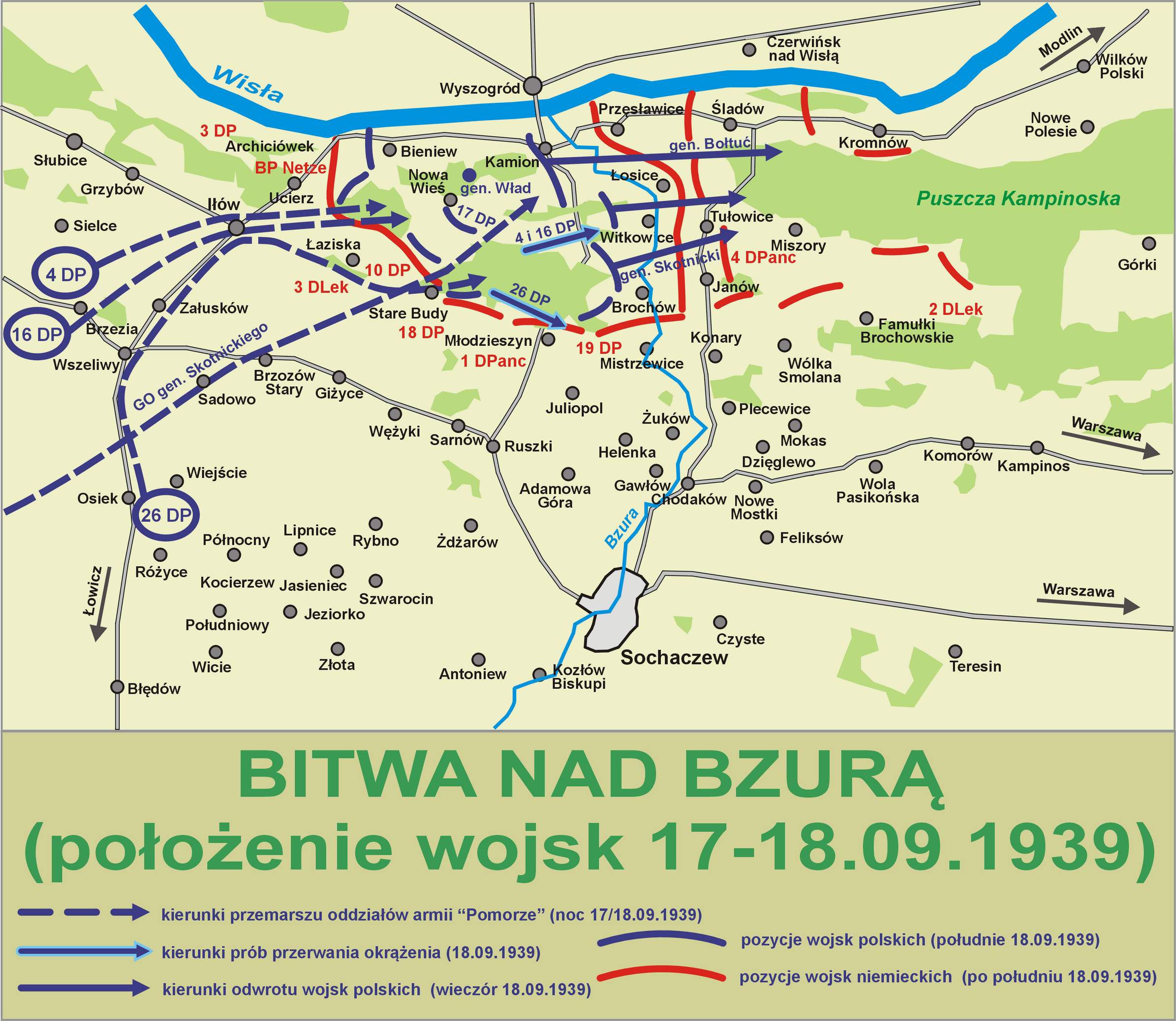
Third and final phase of the battle

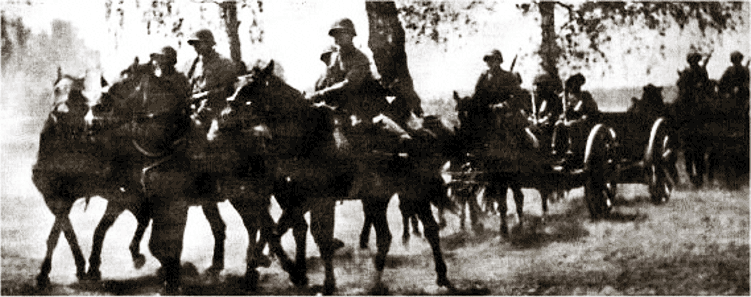
Polish Horse artillery in Battle of the Bzura 1939, near Sochaczew.

On 15 and 16 September, Army Pomorze took up defensive positions on the north bank of the Bzura. General Stanisław Grzmot-Skotnicki's group between Kutno and Żychlin, General Michał Karaszewicz-Tokarzewski's units near Gąbin and parts of Army Poznań by the Bzura near Sochaczew were ready to begin their drive towards Warsaw. To encircle and to destroy the Polish forces, the Germans used most of their 10th Army, including two armoured, one motorized and three light divisions, which was equipped with some 800 tanks altogether. The attack from all sides on Polish positions started on 16 September with the support of the Luftwaffe. On 15 September, the Poles were forced out of Sochaczew, a town on the Bzura river, and were trapped in a triangle of Bzura, Vistula and German forces. The German 1st Panzer Division, after crossing the Bzura between Sochaczew and Brochów and engaging the Polish 25th Infantry Division, managed to capture Ruszki, but its advance was then halted. Poles began to cross the Bzura near the Vistula, north of Sochaczew, and retreat towards Warsaw.

The Polish forces were forced to abandon most of their heavy equipment while they crossed the river. On 17 September, German heavy artillery was shelling the crossing north of Brochów, and the largest air operation of the campaign began, with the Luftwaffe attacking the retreating Polish forces.

During the night of 17 September, the main forces of Army Poznań attacked the German forces to break out of the German encirclement between Witkowice and Sochaczew. The 15th Infantry Division and Podolska Cavalry Brigade again crossed the Bzura in Witkowice. In Brochow, the 25th and the 17th Infantry Divisions crossed the Bzura. The 14th Infantry Division was concentrated in Łaziska. At the same time, Army Pomorze marched towards the villages of Osmolin, Kierozia and Osiek.

In the morning, the Germans started their drive towards the south along both banks of the Bzura and were supported by more than 300 aircraft and heavy artillery. German howitzers, taking advantage of their position on the high ground of the Vistula's right bank, shelled Polish positions for the entire day. After two days of heavy fighting, with no ammunition or food rations remaining, further attempts at a breakout for the Poles became impossible.

== Aftermath ==
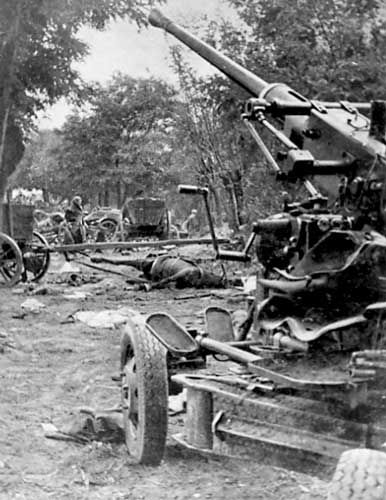
The aftermath of a bombing of a Polish column, with a Bofors 40 mm gun in the foreground

"[My soldiers fought] in one of the biggest and most destructive battles of all times."

— Johannes Blaskowitz, Order of the 20th September

Only a few Polish units managed to break out of the encirclement. The groups crossed the Kampinos Forest and fought German units in the area (such as at the Battle of Wólka Węglowa), then entered Warsaw and Modlin, mostly around 19 and 20 September. Among them were Generals Kutrzeba, Knoll-Kowacki and Tokarzewski, two cavalry brigades (Wielkopolska and Podolska) of General Abraham and the 15th and 25th Infantry Divisions. The remainder (4th, 14th, 17th, 26th and 27th Infantry Divisions), which did not manage to cross the river, surrendered with General Bortnowski between 18 and 22 September. Polish casualties were estimated at 20,000 dead, including three generals: Franciszek Wład, Stanisław Grzmot-Skotnicki and Mikołaj Bołtuć. German casualties are estimated at 8,000 dead.

After the battle, the remaining German divisions rushed towards Warsaw and Modlin and soon encircled both. The Bzura campaign ended in defeat for the Poles, but because of the initial Polish local successes, the German advance on Warsaw was halted for several days. The Wehrmacht was required to divert units from its push towards Warsaw. That helped the Polish units defending Warsaw and its environs to organise their own long-term but ultimately failed defence of the capital.

The campaign also showed the importance of taking initiative, proved that horse cavalry units were still an important factor on the battlefield, proved the importance of air superiority and confirmed that simple numerical superiority still mattered.

== Assessment ==
The battle has been described as "the bloodiest and most bitter battle of the entire Polish campaign". Winston Churchill called the battle an "ever-glorious struggle".

== See also ==
- List of World War II military equipment of Poland
- List of German military equipment of World War II
