= 15th Infantry Regiment (Poland) =

15th Wolves Infantry Regiment (1919–1957) Infantry Regiment of the Land of Bochnia (1918–1919)
- 15 Pulk Piechoty Wilkow, 15 pp
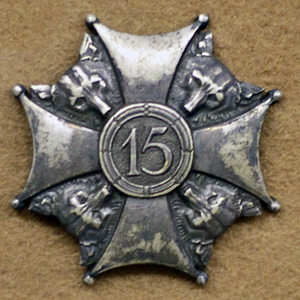
- Active: December 1918 – 25 September 1939; 13 September 1941 – 25 October 1942; 5 July 1944 – 2 April 1957
- Country: Poland
- Role: Infantry
- Part of: 28th Infantry Division (1921-1939); 5th Infantry Division (1941-1942, 1944-1957)
- Garrison/HQ: Bochnia (1918-1919); Ostrów Mazowiecka (1919-1921); Dęblin (1921-1939); Tatishchevo, Saratov Oblast (1941-1942); Małe Koszaryszcze (1944)
- Nickname: Wolf Regiment
- Anniversaries: September 5
- Engagements: Polish-Ukrainian War; Polish-Soviet War: Kiev offensive; Battle of Stepankowice; World War II: Invasion of Poland; Siege of Warsaw; Battle of Modlin; Battle of Berlin; Lusatian Operation

15th Wolves Infantry Regiment (Polish language: 15 Pulk Piechoty Wilkow, 15 pp) was an infantry regiment of the Polish Army. It existed from January 1919 until September 1939. Garrisoned first in Bochnia and Ostrów Mazowiecka, and finally in Dęblin (1921–1939), the unit belonged to the 28th Infantry Division from Warsaw.

== Beginnings ==
In December 1918 in Bochnia, Colonel Ludwik Piatkowski, together with Major Jozef Wolf, formed the Infantry Regiment of the Land of Bochnia. On January 1, 1919, Colonel Wilhelm Frys became first commandant of the new unit. Soon afterwards, its name was changed into the 15th Infantry Regiment.

On March 13, 1919, 1st Battalion of the Regiment (16 officers and 436 soldiers), which consisted mostly of volunteers from the counties of Bochnia, Grybów and Gorlice, left for the Ukrainian front. At the same time, two additional battalions were formed.

On June 1, 1919, new commandant, Colonel Rudolf Tarnawski, completed all battalions, and in mid-August the whole regiment was sent to the Soviet front. On July 3, 1920, Major Boleslaw Zaleski, in honour of the ferocity of its soldiers facing the enemy, nicknamed the unit the “Wolf Regiment”.

The 15th Wolves Infantry Regiment fought with distinction in the Polish-Ukrainian War and the Polish-Soviet War. It captured 5 cannons, 100 machine guns, 1500 POWs, 100 horses and stocks of enemy equipment, together with a Soviet flag.

== Second Polish Republic ==
Following the Polish-Soviet War, the regiment remained for a year in eastern Poland, guarding the newly established border between the two countries. Finally, in mid-August 1921, it was transported to Dęblin, where it stayed until September 1939.

During the 1939 Invasion of Poland, the 15th Wolves Infantry Regiment belonged to the 28th Infantry Division from Warsaw.

== Polish Armed Forces in the East ==
The regiment was reformed on 13 September 1941 in Tatishchevo. It was placed under the command of Lt. Col. Antoni Szymański and then attached to the 5th Infantry Division. The regiment was disbanded on 25 October 1942.

The Home Army formed two regiments in 1944 that were numbered 15 in honor of the 15th Wolves Infantry Regiment.

On 5 July 1944, the regiment was once again reformed. It was reformed in the village of Małe Koszaryszcze and was attached to the 5th Infantry Division.

== Cold War ==
On 2 April 1957, the regiment was disbanded.

== Commandants ==
- Colonel Wilhelm Frys (1919),
- Colonel Rudolf Tarnawski (1 VI – 4 X 1919),
- Major Jozef Wolf (1919),
- Colonel Romuald Dàbrowski (1919–1920),
- Major Jozef Wolf (1920),
- Major Boleslaw Zaleski (1920),
- Major Edward Dojan-Surowka (1921),
- Colonel Antoni Kaminski (1923),
- Colonel Romuald Kohutnicki (1923–1925),
- Colonel Ludwik Lichtarowicz (1925–1927),
- Colonel Jan Jagmin-Sadowski (1928 - 1931),
- Colonel Wladyslaw Mikolajczak (1935–1038),
- Colonel Wladyslaw Fraczek (1938 – 3 IX 1939),
- Major Walerian Wielezynski (3 IX – 6 IX 1939),
- Major Jozef Ratajczak (6 IX 1939),
- Lt. Col. Antoni Szymański (13 September 1941 - 29 March 1942),
- Lt. Col. Jan Lachowicz (March 29 - October 25, 1942),
- Colonel Stanisław Rozciecha
- Lt. Col. Wasyl Humeniuk (od VII 1944)
- Major Jerzy Wilczyński (od X 1946)
- Lt. Col. Walerian Kuczyński (od VII 1947)
- Major Zdzisław Bobecki (V 1948 - IV 1950)
- Lt. Col. Zygmunt Stawski (był w 1956)

== Symbols ==
The flag of the regiment, purchased by the residents of Bochnia, was handed to its soldiers in Molodeczno, on August 6, 1921.

The badge, approved in June 1932, was in the shape of the Knight's Cross, with four heads of wolves on the wings.

On December 4, 1920 near Lida, Marshall Jozef Pilsudski decorated the flags of the 9th Infantry Division (together with the 15th Wolves Infantry Regiment, which belonged to that division) with the Virtuti Militari.

The regiment celebrated its holiday on September 5, the anniversary of the 1920 Battle of Stepankowice.

== Sources ==
- Ginalski, Edmund (1972). Od Żytomierza do Litomeric. Zarys dziejów 15 pułku piechoty 1944-1947 [From Zhytomyr to Litomerice. Outline of the history of the 15th Infantry Regiment 1944-1947] (in Polish). Warsaw: Wydawnictwo Ministerstwa Obrony Narodowej.
- Kajetanowicz, Jerzy (2005). Polskie wojska lądowe 1945–1960: skład bojowy, struktury organizacyjne i uzbrojenie [Polish Land Forces 1945–1960: Combat Composition, Organizational Structures and Weapons] (in Polish). Toruń; Łysomice: Europejskie Centrum Edukacyjne. ISBN 8388089676.
- Nalepa, Edward Jan (1992). Pacyfikacja zbuntowanego miasta. Wojsko Polskie w czerwcu 1956 r. w Poznaniu w świetle dokumentów wojskowych [The pacification of the rebellious city. The Polish Army in June 1956 in Poznań in the light of military documents] (in Polish). Warsaw: Wydawnictwo Bellona. ISBN 8311079595.
- Kazimierz Satora: Opowieści wrześniowych sztandarów. Warszawa: Instytut Wydawniczy Pax, 1990
- Zdzisław Jagiełło: Piechota Wojska Polskiego 1918–1939. Warszawa: Bellona, 2007

== See also ==
- 1939 Infantry Regiment (Poland)
