= Franciszek Wład =

Polish general (1888–1939)

Franciszek Sewerin Wład (17 October 1888 in Ottynia – 18 September 1939 at Januszew lodge near Wyszogród) was a Polish brigadier general. From October 28, 1930 until the German invasion of Poland, he commanded the 14th Infantry Division and was mortally wounded in the battle of Bzura. He subsequently died on 18 September 1939.

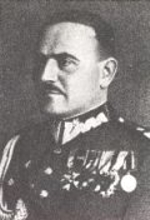
Franciszek Sewerin Wład

== Awards and decorations ==
- War Order of Virtuti Militari - Silver Cross
- Krzyż Walecznych two times<
- Officer's Cross to the Order of Polonia Restituta
- Royal Order of the Sword - Commander
- Commander's Cross to the Order of Polonia Restituta
- Gold Cross of Merit
- Knight to the Legion of Honour
- Commander to the Order of the Crown of Romania
- Medal 10-lecia Odzyskania Niepodleglosci
- Medal Pamiatkowy za Wojne 1918-1921
- Znak 1 pspodh.
