= Franciszek Alter =

Polish general

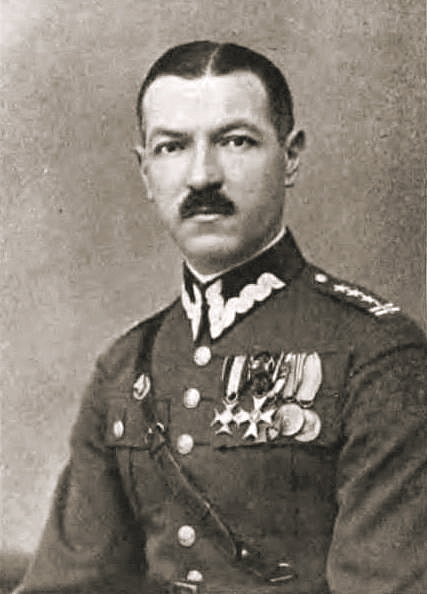

Franciszek Alter (22 November 1889 in Lviv – 23 January 1945 in Garmisch-Partenkirchen) was a Polish general.

== Career ==
Franciszek Alter began his career as an officer in the Austro-Hungarian Army, reaching the rank of captain. He fought in the Polish Army during the Polish-Soviet War. He was promoted to general in March 1939. During the German invasion of Poland, he commanded the 25th Infantry Division (part of the Army Poznań). His division took part in the battle of Bzura and the defense of Warsaw, where it capitulated on 28 September.

== Death ==
Alter refused to sign the Volksliste, and was imprisoned in the Oflag VII-A Murnau. In the Oflag, he fell ill, and died in early 1945, on 23 January.

== Awards ==
Alter was awarded with the Silver Cross of the Virtuti Militari, the Knight's Cross of the Polonia Restituta, the Cross of Valour (four times) and the Cross of Independence.
