= 28th Infantry Division (Poland) =

28th Infantry Division: 28. Dywizja Piechoty
- Active: 1921–1944
- Country: Poland
- Branch: land forces
- Type: infantry
- Role: general purpose
- Garrison/HQ: Warsaw
- Patron: Warsaw, Stefan Okrzeja in 1944
- Engagements: Battle of Łódź, Battle of Modlin, Battle of Warsaw (1939), Warsaw Uprising

Commanders
- Notable commanders: Władysław Bończa-Uzdowski, Edward Pfeiffer

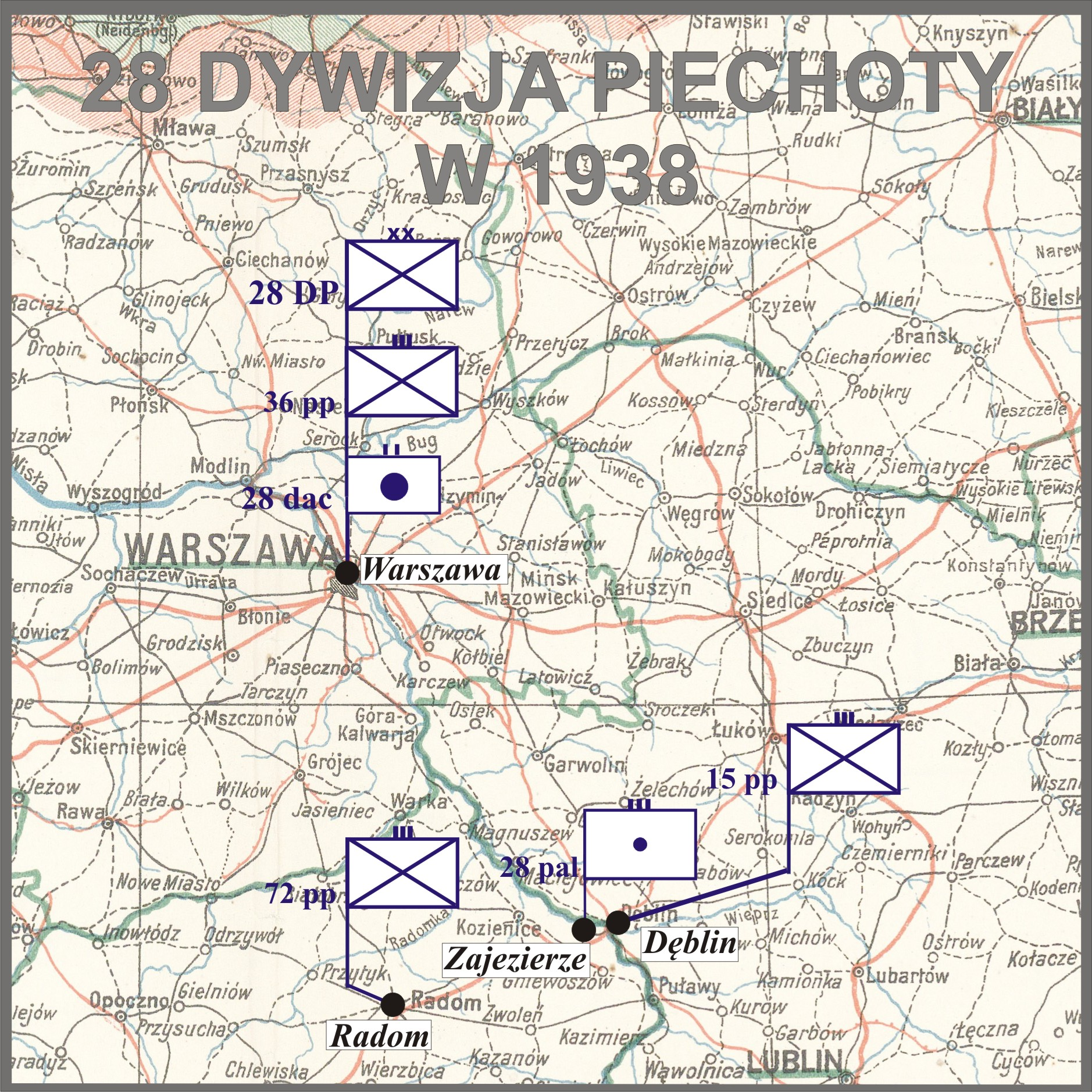
28 DP w 1938

The 28 Dywizja Piechoty was a Polish Army infantry division which saw action against the invading Germans during the Invasion of Poland of World War II. The division suffered heavy casualties in battles near Łódź and the remnants retreated to Warsaw, where they surrendered.

The history of the division dates back to the autumn of 1921, when Polish Army changed its structure, after the victorious Polish–Soviet War. New unit was formed in Warsaw, out of three previously existing infantry regiments, and one light artillery regiment. The 15th Infantry Regiment, which had belonged to the 9th Infantry Division, was on August 19–21 transported by rail to Dęblin, which became its peacetime garrison. The 36th Infantry Regiment, previously of the 8th Infantry Division, remained in Warsaw, and the 72nd Infantry Regiment (previously of the 18th Infantry Division) was on October 7–8, 1921, transported from Brzesc nad Bugiem to Warsaw. Furthermore, the 28th Light Artillery Regiment, which had been formed on September 7, 1921, in Zambrów, was attached to the division and transported to Radom (Sept. 19–21, 1921).

In 1921–1939, the 28th Division was part of the 1st Military District. In 1922, the 28th Light Artillery Regiment was moved from Radom to Zajezierze near Dęblin, and in April 1922, the 72nd Infantry Regiment was transferred from Warsaw to Radom.

In the 1939 German Invasion of Poland, the division, commanded by General Władysław Bończa-Uzdowski, belonged to Łódź Army. In the morning of September 1, 1939, it clashed with the advancing Wehrmacht near the villages of Łagiewniki and Raczyn, managing to halt the advance of the 1st Light Division. Due to repeated Luftwaffe attacks and artillery barrage, the unit suffered heavy losses and was ordered to retreat behind the Warta river.

On September 3, the division filled defensive positions behind the Warta and Widawa, near Wieluń. Due to contradictory orders of General Boncza-Uzdowski, its 15th Infantry Regiment was almost completely destroyed, and had to be replaced by the 36th Regiment. Nevertheless, German 1st Light Division managed to break through Polish lines. As a result, the 36th and 72nd Regiments withdrew in the night of September 3/4 to the Widawka river, which was the main Polish defensive position in the area. On September 4, the 4th Infantry Regiment (from 2nd Legions Infantry Division) was sent there, to reinforce Polish units.

On September 7, German 17th Infantry Division (General Herbert Loch) began its advance towards Pabianice. The town was defended by the recreated 15th Infantry Regiment, while the Germans were reinforced with SS Leibstandarte Adolf Hitler. The fighting in Pabianice was extremely bloody, with high losses on both sides. By the evening, the enemy reached the center of the town but was quickly forced to flee. Meanwhile, however, the 2nd Legions Infantry Division, which was located north of Pabianice, retreated eastwards, forming a gap which the Germans immediately used. In the southern wing, the 72nd Infantry Regiment was almost completely destroyed.

Under the circumstances, the division was ordered to regroup and abandon the area of Pabianice. During the retreat, the 15th Infantry Regiment clashed with the Germans near Ksawerow. The division was ordered to concentrate near Wola Cyrusowa, where on September 8, 1939, the Battle of Wola Cyrusowa took place.

On September 9, General Wiktor Thommee ordered the division to retreat behind the Rawka river. On the next day, the order was changed and the division marched towards Warsaw, via Pruszków. Despite initial successes, it failed to break through German positions. As a result, the division made an attempt to reach the fortress of Modlin. After entering the complex, it took part in the Battle of Modlin, until the capitulation on September 29.

== Commanders ==
- gen.bryg. Władysław Bończa-Uzdowski

== Order of battle ==
- HQ (Słuzby)
- 15th Wolves Infantry Regiment (15 pułk piechoty Wilków)
- 36th Academic's Legion Infantry Regiment (36 pułk piechoty Legii Akademickiej)
- 72nd Płk. Dioznizy Czachowski's Infantry Regiment (72 pułk piechoty im. płk. Dionizego Czachowskiego)
- 28th Light Artillery Regiment (28 pułk artylerii lekkiej)
- 28th Heavy Artillery Squadron (28 dywizjon artylerii cięzkiej)
- 28th AA Artillery Battery (28 bateria artylerii p-lot.)
- 28th Engineers Battalion (28 batalion saperów)
- 28th Telephone Company (28 kompania telefoniczna)
- Divisional Cavalry (kawaleria dywizyjna)
- 13th Bicycle Infantry Company (13 kompania kolarzy)
- 117th Mobile HMG Company (117 kompania ckm na taczankach)

== See also ==
- Polish army order of battle in 1939
- Polish contribution to World War II
- List of Polish divisions in World War II
