= 17th Infantry Division (Poland) =

Coordinates: 52.5349°N 17.5827°E

17 Greater Poland Infantry Division was a unit of the Polish Army in the interbellum period. It garrisoned Gniezno and neighboring towns, such as Pleszew and Września. The unit was formed on June 9, 1919, as 3rd Division of Greater Poland Rifles. In 1921 it was renamed into 17 Greater Poland Infantry Division.

During the Polish September Campaign, the Division, under Colonel Mieczyslaw Mozdyniewicz, was part of the Poznań Army. It was destroyed by the Wehrmacht in mid-September 1939, during the Battle of the Bzura.

The 17th Division was briefly reformed as part of the People's Army of Poland in 1945–46.

== See also ==
- Polish army order of battle in 1939
- Polish contribution to World War II
- List of Polish divisions in World War II
