= 14th Infantry Division (Poland) =

Unit of the Polish army

14 Greater Poland Infantry Division (Polish: 14 Wielkopolska Dywizja Piechoty) was a unit of the Polish Army in the interbellum period, which took part in the Polish September Campaign.

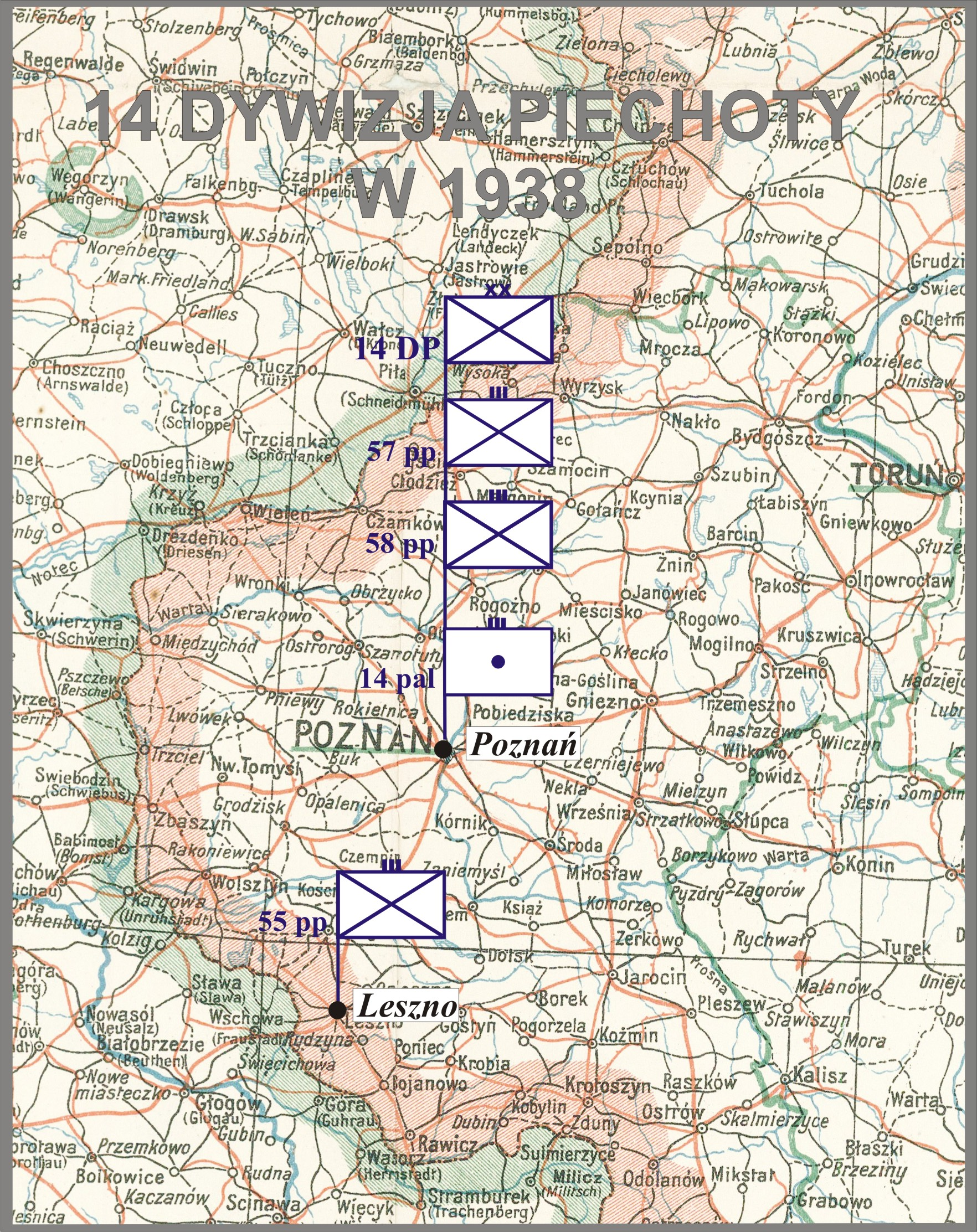
14 DP w 1938

It was created in January 1919 in Poznań, as part of Polish forces fighting in the Greater Poland Uprising (1918–1919). Its organizer and first commandant was General Filip Dubiski. In the following months, several regiments created in the Greater Poland towns joined the unit, and in the summer of 1919, the Division was sent to the east, to fight the Red Army south of Polotsk. On December 19, 1919, its name was changed from 1st Division of Greater Poland Rifles to 14 Greater Poland Infantry Division.

The unit fought in the Polish–Soviet War, and in December 1920, after the truce, it returned to its homeland, to Poznań. According to the Plan Wschod, the Division was supposed to serve as a rear unit; however, in the late 1930s the German threat became real, and on March 23, 1939, the Division became part of newly created Poznań Army, under General Tadeusz Kutrzeba (see: Plan Zachod). Mobilization took place between August 24 and 27.

As the Wehrmacht did not carry out attacks on Greater Poland in the first days of the Polish September Campaign, the Division did not engage in combat until September 8. Then, it took part in the Battle of the Bzura, fighting near the town of Piątek and breaking German lines. During the skirmishes, the commandant of German 30th Infantry Division, General Kurt von Briesen, was injured and the Wehrmacht ordered a retreat. However, the Poles, without air and artillery support, did not take advantage of this breakthrough. Soon afterwards, the Germans counterattacked.

On 16 September the division was at the Jeziorko-Emiliano woods when the German XVI Corps attacked. The division's 57th Infantry Regiment was defeated and it withdrew to the rear with the 2nd battalion of the divisional light artillery regiment. The 55th Infantry Regiment halted an attack by German armour at Szwarocin.

In mid-September the Division tried to cross the Bzura and reach the Kampinos Forest but without success. Only few soldiers managed to reach and hide in the forest. On September 19, the remaining forces broke into besieged Warsaw. There, they fought until capitulation, on September 28.

== Table of organization and equipment ==
- HQ
- 55th Infantry Regiment
- 57th Infantry Regiment
- 58th Infantry Regiment
- 14th Light Artillery Regiment
- 14th Heavy Artillery Battalion
- 71st AA Artillery Battery
- 14th Telephone Company
- 71st Mobile HMG Company
- Bicycle Infantry Company
- Divisional Cavalry

== See also ==
- Polish army order of battle in 1939
- Polish contribution to World War II
- 1939 Infantry Regiment (Poland)
- List of Polish divisions in World War II
