= 30th Infantry Division (Poland) =

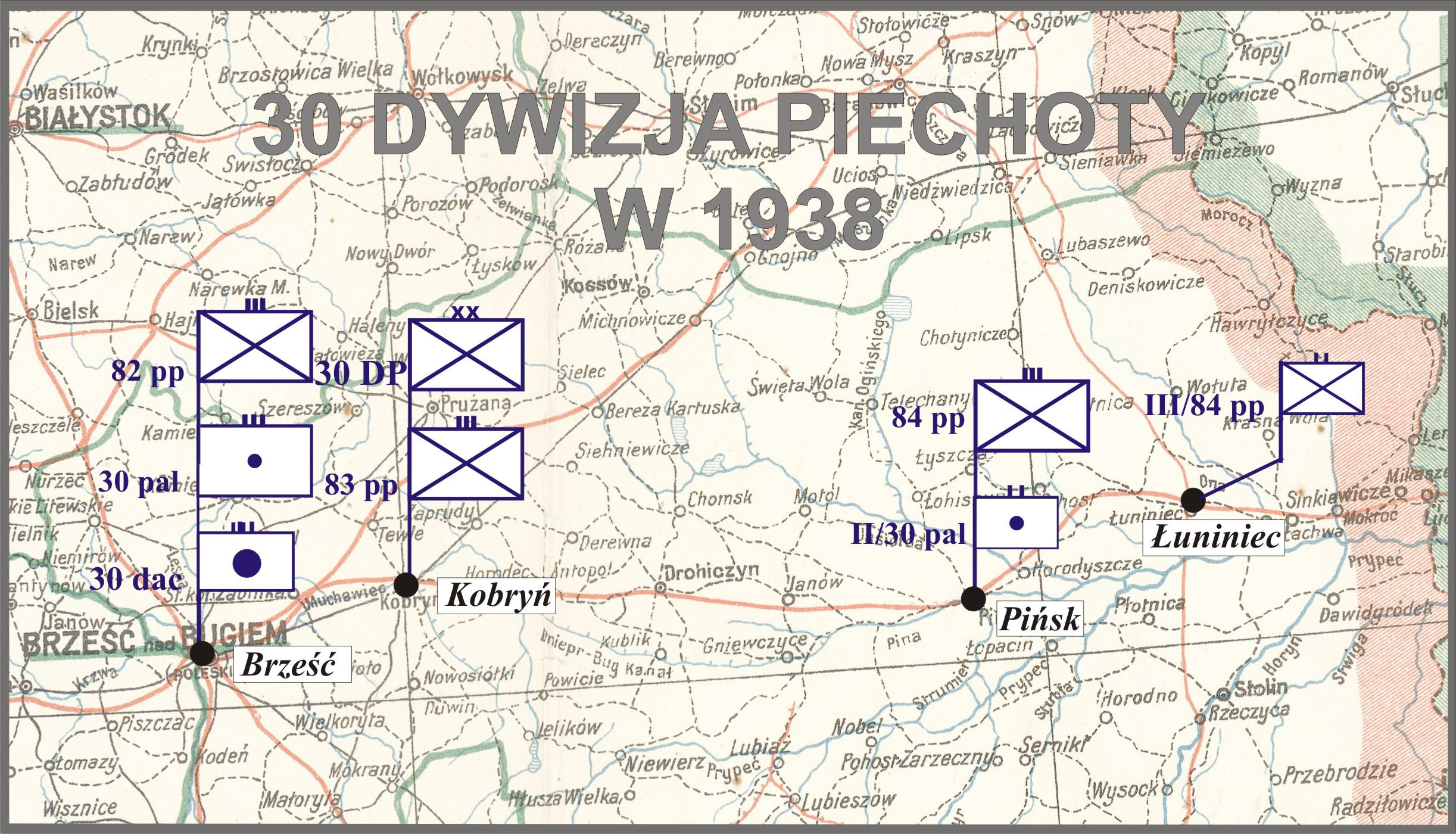
30 DP in 1938

The 30th Polesie Infantry Division (Polish: 30. Poleska Dywizja Piechoty, abr. 30 DP), was a unit of the Polish Army in the inter-war period. It was stationed in Kobryn, as well as other towns of the Polesie Voivodeship - Brześć nad Bugiem and Pinsk. It was commanded by Colonel Mieczysław Mackiewicz (1921–26), General Stanisław Tessaro (1926–29), Colonel Stanisław Wrzaliński (1929–31) and General Emil Krukowicz-Przedrzymirski (1931-1938).

In the Polish September Campaign, the division, under General Leopold Cehak, was part of the Operational Group "Piotrków" of the Łódź Army. The 30th was the only division of the Polish Army, which took its defensive positions near pre-1939 Polish-German border as early as in March 1939. It was carried by trains and placed southwest of Piotrków Trybunalski along the Warta river. Soon before German attack on Poland, it was reinforced with the 41st Tank Company. A few hours before the war, the Division was reinforced again, this time by two armored trains - nr. 52 "Baszta" and nr. 53 "Śmiały".

Facing the Poles were two German divisions - 18th I.D. and 19th I.D. On September 2, 1939, the Wehrmacht broke through Polish lines and crossed the Warta near Działoszyn, street fighting took place in the very town. On the same day in the evening, the Germans organized a general attack, forcing the Poles to withdraw towards its main defence line, along the Widawka river. On September 4 and 5, 30th I.D. repelled attacks of the German XI Corps near Szczerców. However, facing encirclement, it had to withdraw, fighting near Słupia. Ordered to get to Warsaw, it set off on September 10, but despite initial successes, the plan failed. On September 13, remains of the Division entered the fortress of Modlin, fighting there until capitulation on September 29.

== See also ==
- Polish army order of battle in 1939
- Polish contribution to World War II
- List of Polish divisions in World War II
