= Poznań Army =

1939 Polish Army unit

Poznan Army
- Active: Mar 23 - Sep 21, 1939
- Country: Poland
- Type: Headquarters
- Size: 4 divisions and 2 brigades
- Engagements: Battle of the Bzura

Commanders
- Notable commanders: Tadeusz Kutrzeba

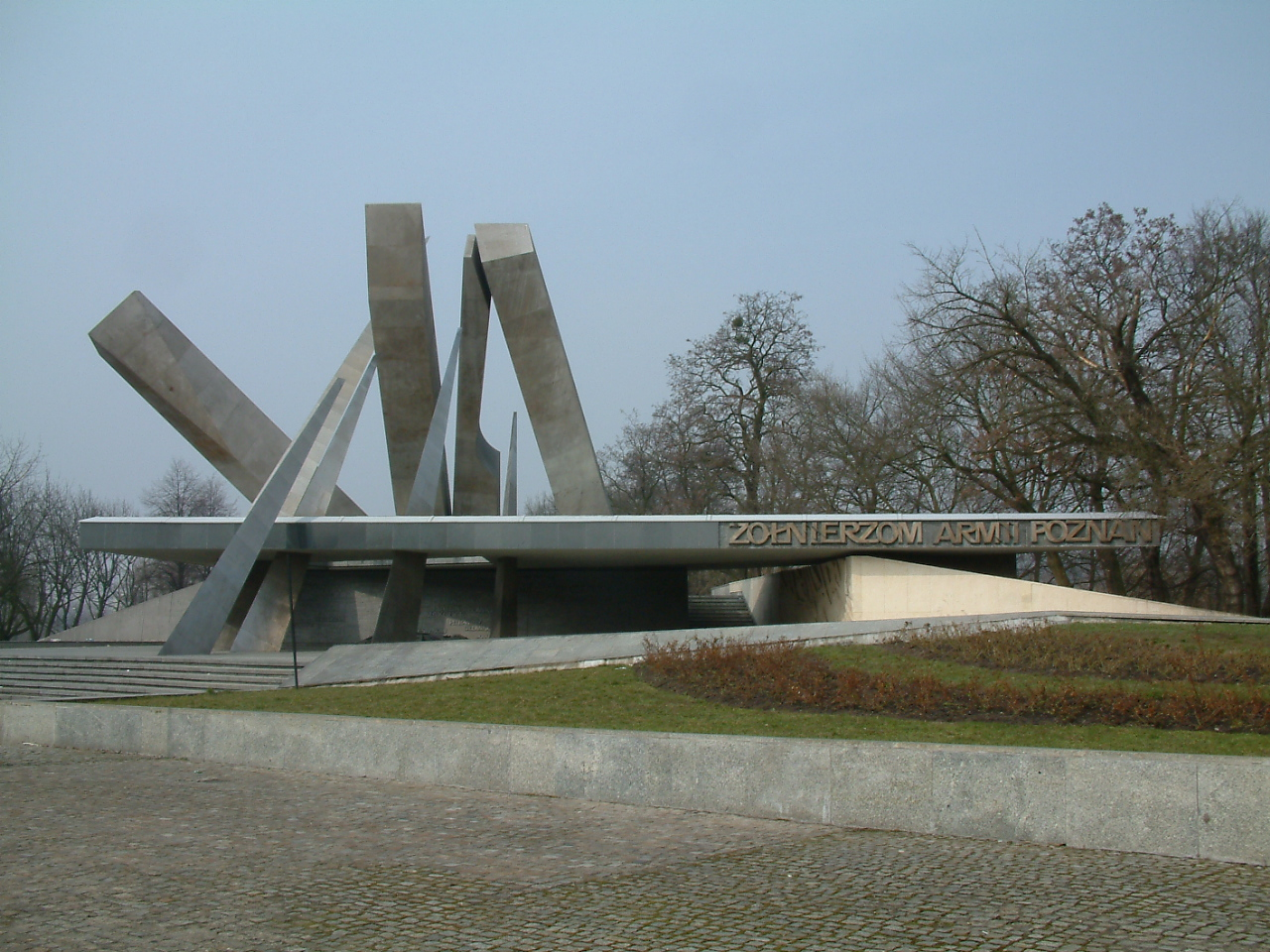
A monument to Poznań army in Poznań.

Army Poznań (Polish: Armia Poznań), led by Major General Tadeusz Kutrzeba, was one of the Polish Armies during the Invasion of Poland in 1939 in the beginning of World War II.

== Tasks ==
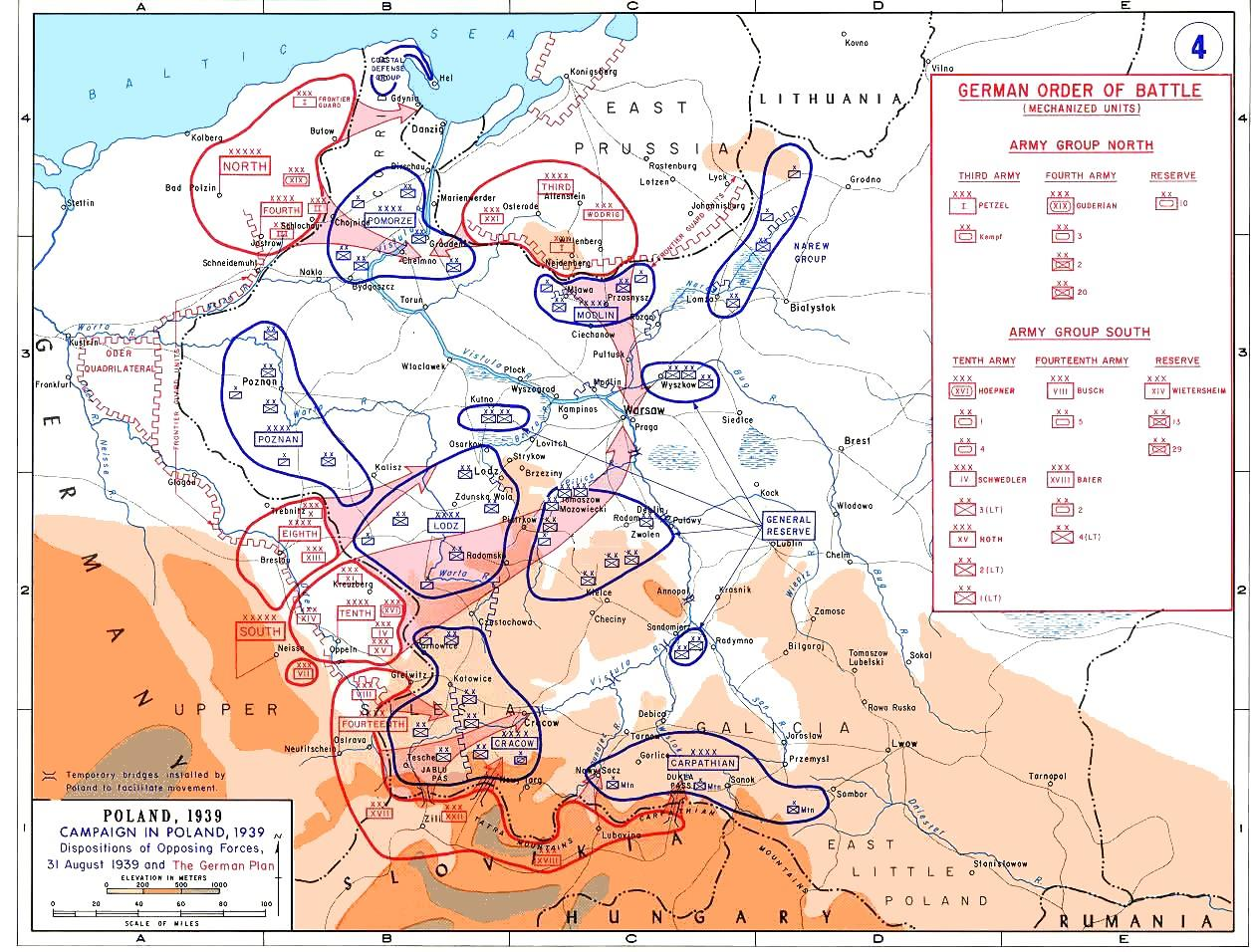
Forces as of 31 August and German plan of attack.

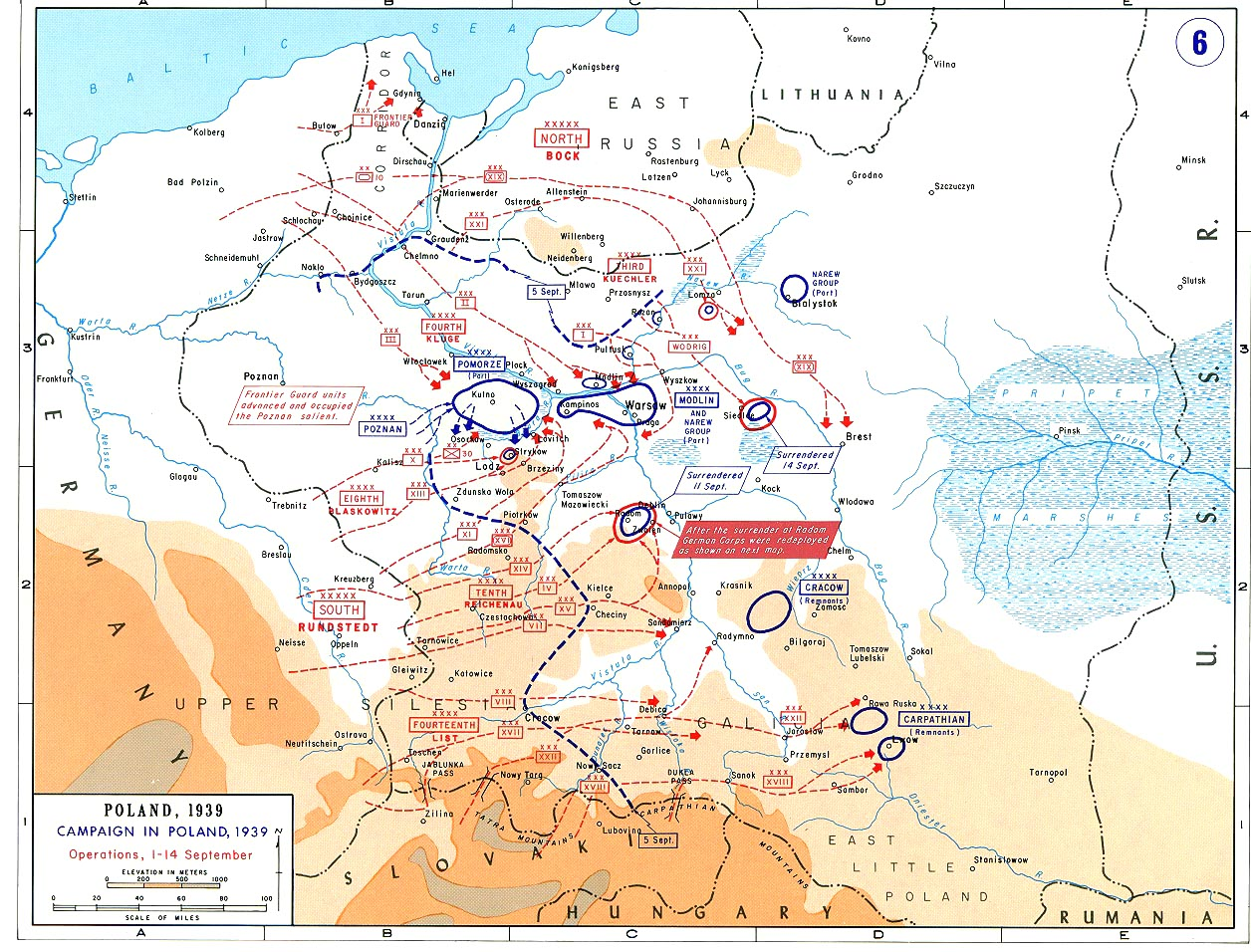
Forces as of 14 September with troop movements up to this date.

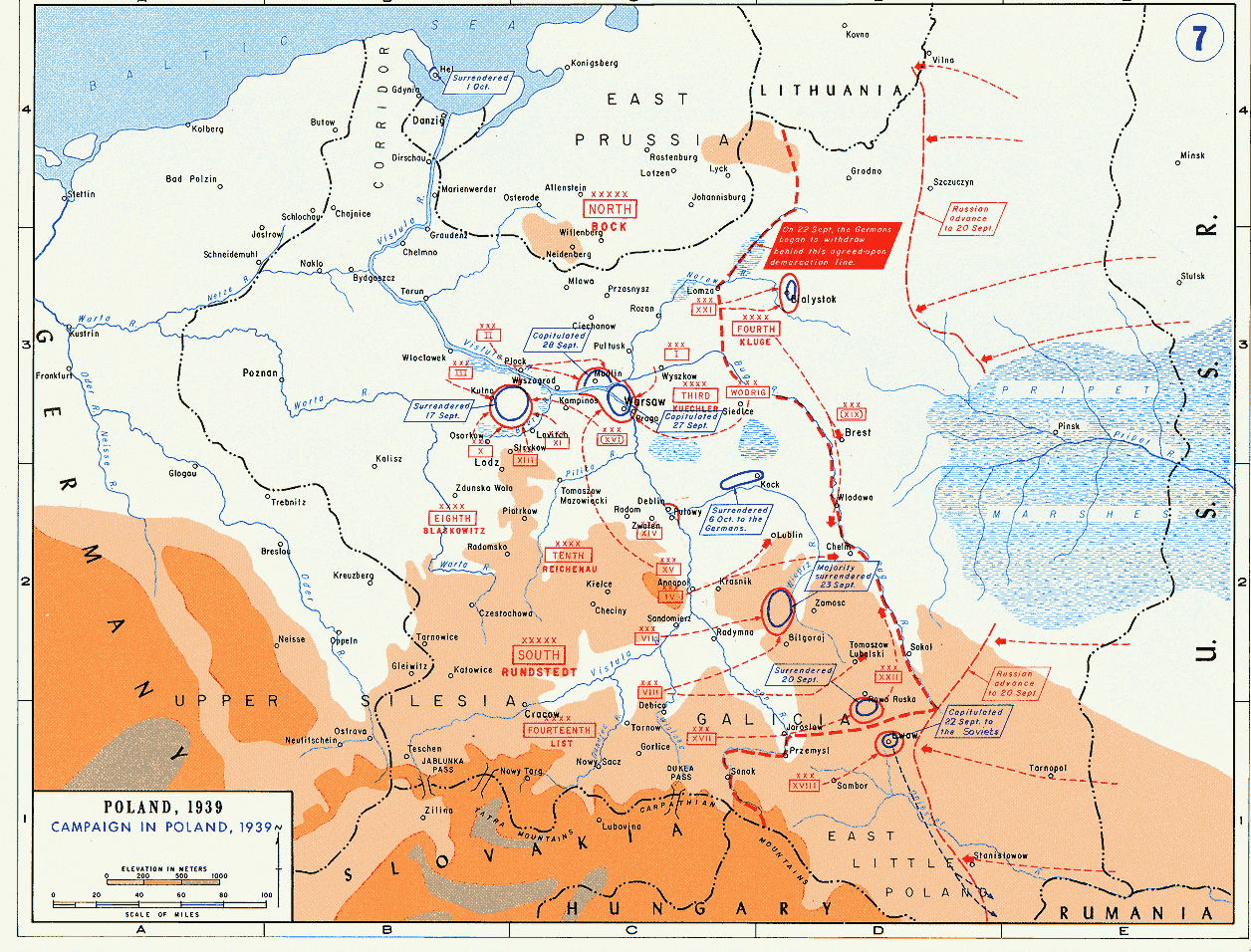
Forces after 14 September with troop movements after this date

Flanked by Armia Pomorze to the north and Łódź Army to the south, the Army was to provide flanking operations in Grand Poland region, defend it and withdraw towards lines of defence along the Warta river.

== Operational history ==
During the Invasion of Poland, in the battle of the Border the German Army Group South struck between Poznań and Łódź Armies, penetrating Polish defenses and forcing Polish armies to retreat. The Poznań Army itself was not heavily engaged during those early days but was forced to retreat due to danger of being flanked. Later the Poznań Army strengthened by the remains of the Pomorze Army took part in the Polish counteroffensive Battle of Bzura; finally remaining units withdrew towards Warsaw and took part in its defense.

== Organization ==
The Army was commanded by gen. Tadeusz Kutrzeba; its chief of staff was colonel Stanisław Lityński.

It consisted of 4 infantry divisions and 2 cavalry brigades.

- 14th Infantry Division (14 Dywizja Piechoty)
- 17th Infantry Division (17 Dywizja Piechoty)
- 25th Infantry Division (25 Dywizja Piechoty)
- 26th Infantry Division (26 Dywizja Piechoty)
- Wielkopolska Cavalry Brigade (Wielkopolska Brygada Kawalerii)
- Podolska Cavalry Brigade (Podolska Brygada Kawalerii)
