= 25th Infantry Division (Poland) =

Military unit

The 25th Infantry Division (Polish: 25 Dywizja Piechoty) was a unit of the Polish Army in the interbellum period, created in 1921 with headquarters in Kalisz. It consisted of the following regiments:

- 29th Infantry Regiment, stationed in Kalisz,
- 56th Infantry Regiment, stationed in Krotoszyn,
- 60th Infantry Regiment, stationed in Ostrów Wielkopolski.

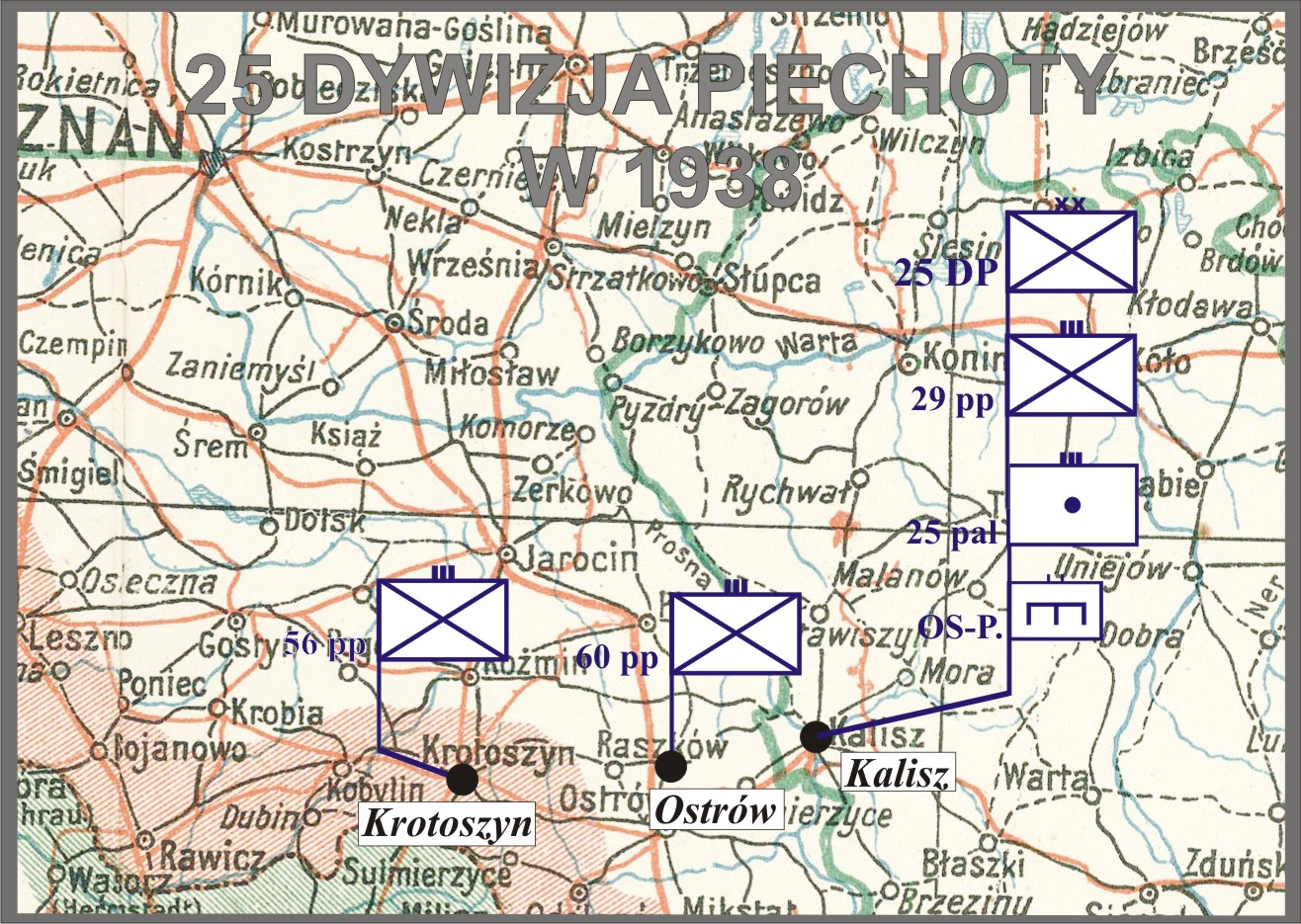
25 DP w 1938

During the Polish September Campaign the Division, under General Franciszek Alter, was part of the Poznań Army. It took part in the border battle, defending Krotoszyn on 1 September 1939. However, parts of the 56th Infantry Regiment were defeated near Rawicz.

For the next days, the Division was in retreat, together with the whole Army. On 8 September it was positioned near Koło, then it took part in the Battle of the Bzura, attacking the Germans at Ozorków and Łęczyca. In the evening of 9 September the division managed to recapture Łęczyca, but a few days later it was ordered to retreat. On 17 September the unit forced its way into the Kampinos Wilderness, where it soon afterwards engaged in bloody skirmishes. After 20 September the remnants of the Division reached Warsaw, taking part in the defence of the city.

== See also ==
- Polish army order of battle in 1939
- Polish contribution to World War II
- List of Polish divisions in World War II
