= Tadeusz Kutrzeba =

Polish general (1885–1947)

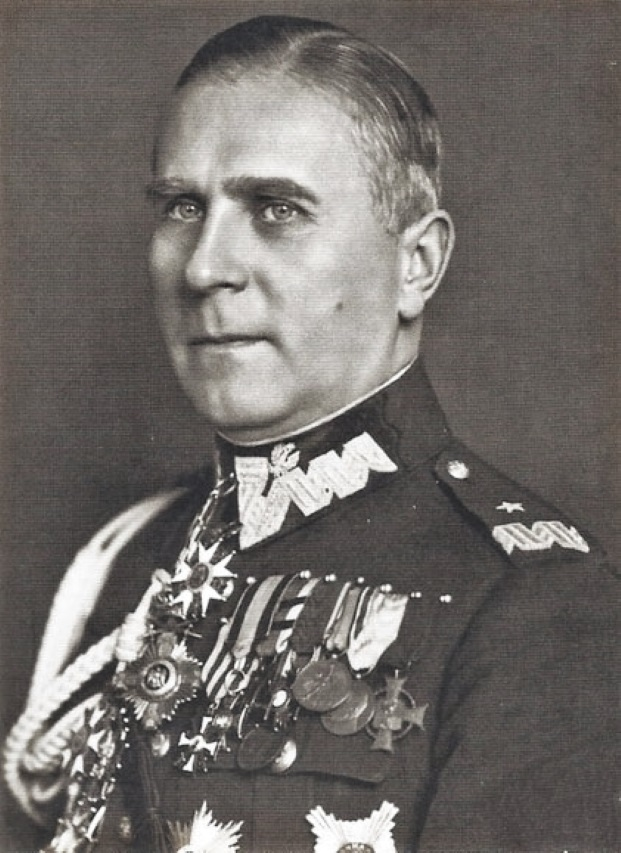
- Born: 15 April 1885; Kraków, Galicia, Austria-Hungary
- Died: 8 January 1947 (aged 61); London, United Kingdom
- Military career
- Allegiance: Austria-Hungary (1903–1918); Second Polish Republic (1918–1939)
- Branch: Austro-Hungarian Army; Polish Legions; Polish Army
- Service years: 1903–1945
- Rank: Major General
- Conflicts: First World War; Polish–Soviet War; Second World War: Invasion of Poland (1939); Battle of Bzura; Siege of Warsaw

Tadeusz Kutrzeba (15 April 1885 – 8 January 1947) was a general of the army during the Second Polish Republic. He served as a major general in the Polish Army in overall command of Army Poznań during the 1939 German Invasion of Poland.

== Biography ==
Tadeusz Kutrzeba was born in Kraków, a part of Austria-Hungary, since the 1795 partition of Poland. His father was a captain in the Imperial Austrian Army. In 1896, he was admitted to a military school for children in Fischau near Wiener Neustadt. He then continued his studies in the city of Hranice. Kutrzeba completed his secondary education in 1903. He graduated with distinction from the Imperial and Royal Technical Military Academy in Mödling and was commissioned as a second lieutenant, in an explosives ordnance unit. On account of his performance in school, he was given the option of choosing the location of his first posting. He chose to return to his native Kraków where he was posted from 1906 to 1910. In 1910, Kutrzeba continued his military education in Vienna, studying engineering, and was promoted to the rank of lieutenant in 1911. From 1913 to 1914, he was posted to Sarajevo, where he witnessed the immediate catalyst for the outbreak of the First World War: the assassination of Archduke Ferdinand.

== World War II ==
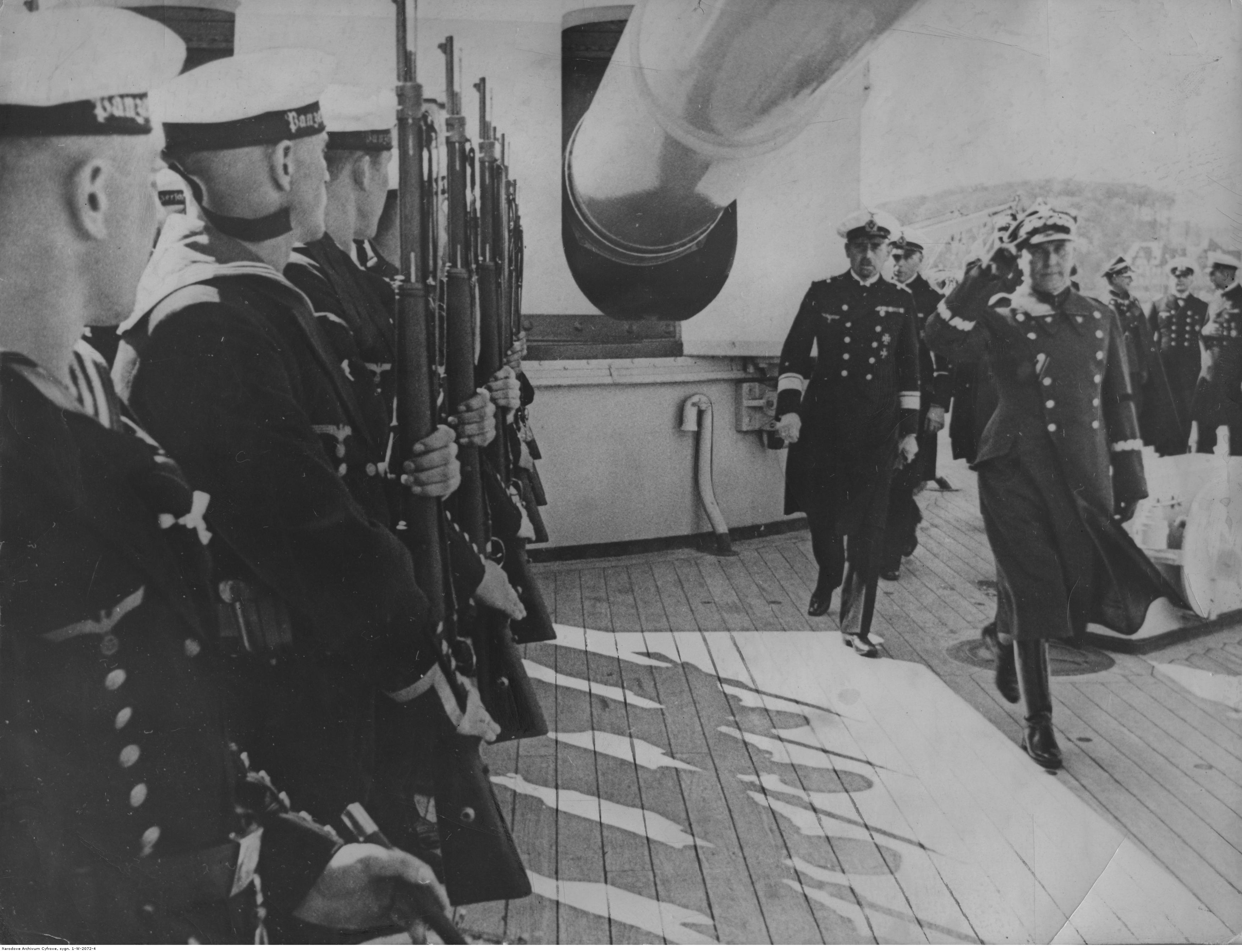
Kutrzeba with Admiral Rolf Carls onboard the German heavy cruiser Deutschland, Kiel, 1935

During the invasion of Poland in 1939, General Kutrzeba commanded the Poznań Army, composed of four infantry divisions (14, 17, 25, 26) and two cavalry brigades (Wielkopolska and Podolska). He devised the Polish counterattack plan of the battle of Bzura and commanded the Poznań and Pomorze Armies during the battle. In the aftermath, he fought his way to Warsaw and arrived in the capital on September 22, where he briefly became the deputy commander of the Warsaw Army. At the behest of major general Juliusz Rómmel (commander of the Warsaw Army), he began capitulation negotiations with the German 8th Army. On September 28, he signed the official surrender documents.

After the siege of Warsaw, he was captured by the Germans and spent the rest of the war in several prisoner of war camps: Hohenstein, Königstein and Oflag VII-A Murnau. General Kutrzeba remained a prisoner of war until April 1945, when Oflag VII-A Murnau was liberated by American forces.

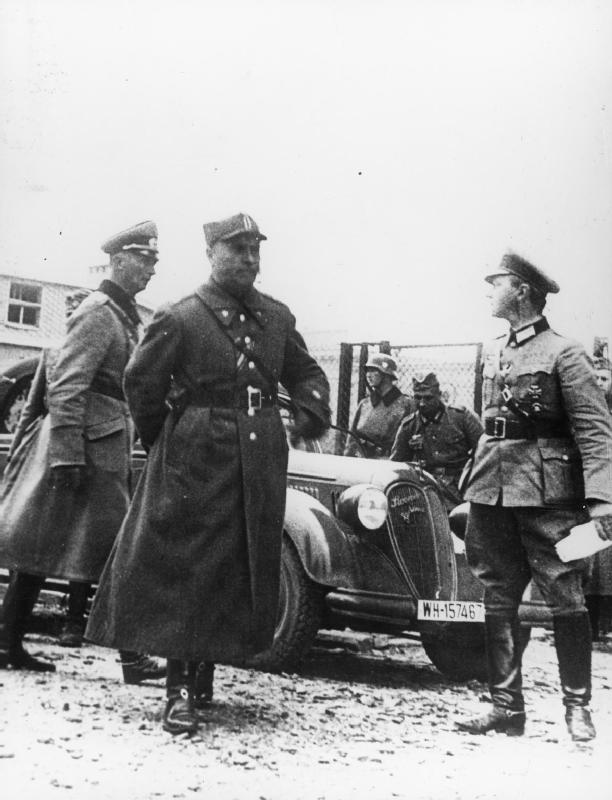
Gen. Kutrzeba arriving to negotiate the surrender of Polish capital with General Johannes Blaskowitz, the Commander of German 8th Army, 1939

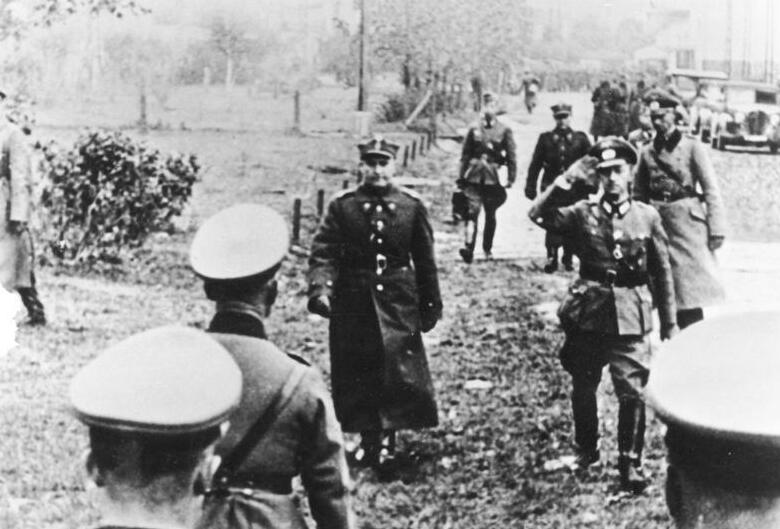
General Kutrzeba shortly before signing the capitulation of Warsaw in 1939

In April 1945 he was called to London, where he was offered the position of Minister of Defense in the Government-in-Exile, which he declined. Instead, he chose to head a historical commission that focused on the Polish Army’s military campaign in September 1939 and the contributions of Polish soldiers fighting in the West from 1939 to 1945.

== Military promotions (Second Polish Republic) ==
- Major (1919)
- Lieutenant Colonel (1920)
- Colonel (1922)
- Brigadier General (1927)
- Major General (1939)

== Death ==
General Kutrzeba was given an opportunity to return to Poland. Due to poor health, however, he was unable to travel. General Kutrzeba died in London on 8 January 1947. Reportedly, the cause of his death was cancer. He was buried with military honors at Brookwood Cemetery. He was posthumously awarded the Virtuti Militari War Order III class.

In 1957, his ashes – according to his last will – were transported to Poland and buried in Aleja Zasłużonych at the Powązki Military Cemetery in Warsaw (section A30-2 semicircle-8).

== Honours and awards ==
=== Poland ===
- Commander's Cross of the Virtuti Militari (posthumously, 1982)
- Knight's Cross of the Virtuti Militari (1947)
- Silver Cross of the Virtuti Militari (1921)
- Commander's Cross of the Order of Polonia Restituta (8 November 1930)
- Officer's Cross of the Order of Polonia Restituta (2 May 1923)
- Cross of Valour, three times
- Golden Cross of Merit (29 April 1925)
- Cross of Merit of the Army of Central Lithuania (3 March 1926)
- Commemorative Medal for the War of 1918–1921
- Golden Academic Laurel (4 November 1937)
- Medal of the Tenth Anniversary of Regained Independence

=== Other ===
- Iron Cross, 2nd Class (German Empire)
- Commander of Order of the Crown (Belgium)
- Cross of Liberty, 1st division, 2nd Class (Estonia)
- Order of the Cross of the Eagle, 2nd Class (Estonia)
- Order of the White Lion, 2nd, 3rd Class (Czechoslovakia)
- Legion of Honour, 2nd, 3rd, 4th, 5th Class (France)
- Order of Lāčplēsis, 3rd Class (Latvia)
- Medal of the 10th Anniversary of the War of Independence (Latvia)
- Order of the Star of Romania, 3rd Class (Romania)
- Order of the Crown of Romania, 1st, 2nd Class (Romania)
- Order of St. Sava, 3rd Class (Kingdom of Yugoslavia)
- Order of the White Rose of Finland, 1st Class (Finland)
- Military Merit Cross, 3rd Class with war decoration and swords (Austria-Hungary)
- Silver and Bronze Military Merit Medal (Austria-Hungary)
- 1908 Jubilee Cross (Austria-Hungary)
- Mobilization Cross 1912/13 (Austria-Hungary)
