= Leon Berbecki =

Polish army officer

General Leon Berbecki
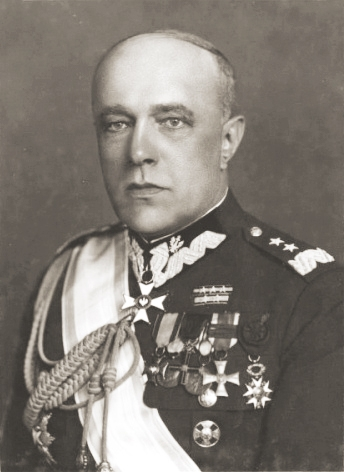
- Leon Berbecki
- Born: Peter Leon Berbecki; 28 July 1875; Kalinowszczyzna (now the district of Lublin), Russian Empire
- Died: 23 March 1963 (aged 87); Gliwice, Poland
- Burial place: Central Cemetery, Gliwice, Poland
- Military career
- Allegiance: Imperial Russia; Poland
- Branch: Imperial Russian Army; Polish Army
- Service years: 1891 – 1939
- Rank: Lieutenant General
- Units: 44th Infantry Regiment; Polish Legions
- Commands: 3rd Polish Legions Division
- Wars: Russo-Japanese War; World War I Polish–Ukrainian War; Polish–Soviet War

Leon Berbecki (28 July 1875, Lublin – 23 March 1963, Gliwice) was a Polish army officer, who fought in the Russo-Japanese War and World War I with the Imperial Russian Army. Following the foundation of the Second Polish Republic, Berbecki served in the Polish Army.

== Early life ==
Peter Leon Berbecki, born on a farm in Kalinowszczyzna in what is now Lublin, was one of four children. After graduating from grammar school, Berbecki enlisted in the army in 1891.

== Military career ==
After a short stint as an enlisted man in the 44th Infantry Regiment, Berbecki was sent to a Junkers military school, returning to his regiment in 1893. After serving as a junior officer, including a stint as quartermaster of his regiment, he left the army in 1901 to study at the Kharkiv Institute of Technology.

In early 1903, he was drafted into the Imperial Russian Army as an officer. He later joined the Polish Legions during World War I (commander of a regiment, battalion, member of headquarters), distinguishing himself in the Battle of Raśna in 1915. After the Oath crisis in 1917, he headed the Polish Auxiliary Corps and was the training inspector of the Polnische Wehrmacht. After Poland regained its independence in 1918, he joined the Polish Army. Promoted to general in June of that year, Berbecki fought in the Polish-Ukrainian War and Polish-Soviet War, commanding the 3rd Polish Legions Division. During the interwar period, he held various functions in the Polish Army and retired in March 1939.

He did not participate in the Polish September Campaign that marked the start of World War II but was arrested by Nazi Germany and interned along with other Polish officers. He returned to Poland in 1945, and published his memoirs "Pamiętnik generała broni" (Memoires of a General) in 1959.

== Honours and awards ==
Recipient of Virtuti Militari (V class), Cross of Independence with Swords, Cross of Valor (4 times) and Cross of Merit (5 times).

- Silver Cross of the Order of Virtuti Militari
- Commander's Cross of the Order of Polonia Restituta
- Independence Cross with Swords
- Independence Medal
- Cross of Valour - four times
- Gold Cross of Merit - five times
- Chevalier of the Legion of Honour
- Order of Lāčplēsis Third Class (Latvia)
