= Edmund Knoll-Kownacki =

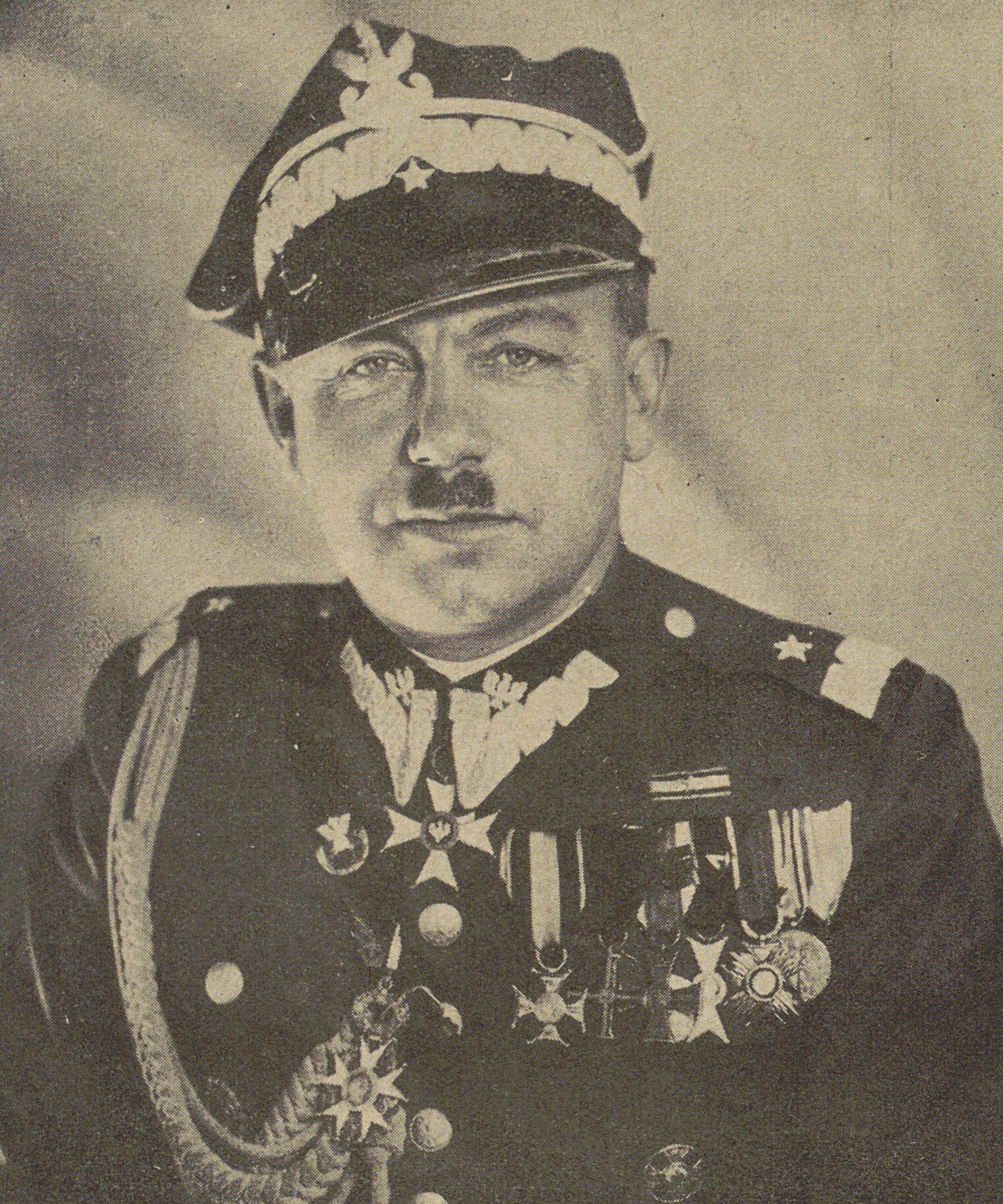
- Gen. Knoll-Kownacki in full uniform, 1930's
- Born: July 12, 1891; Pomiechówek near Płońsk, Congress Poland, Russian Empire
- Died: September 2, 1953 (aged 62) Wales, United Kingdom
- Service years: 1912
- Rank: Generał brygady
- Awards: Virtuti Militari Polonia Restituta Commander's Cross with Star Polonia Restituta Commander's Cross Polonia Restituta Officer's Cross Krzyz Zaslugi Krzyz Niepodleglosci Star of Romania Cross of the Valorous 10 Years of Independence medal Commemorative medal for the war of 1918-1921
- Spouse: Janina Chramiec
- Children: Maria Barbara
- Other work: farmer

Gen.bryg. Edmund Stanisław Knoll-Kownacki (1891–1953) was a Polish military officer and a high-ranking commander of the Polish Army. He died on September 2, 1953, and was buried at the Beaumaris cemetery in Llangefni, Wales. He was married to Janina Chramiec, and had a daughter, Maria Barbara.

== Promotions ==
- Warrant officer – September 15, 1913
- Lieutenant – May 15, 1915
- Captain – November 1, 1916
- Major – October 13, 1918
- Colonel – June 1, 1919
- Brigadier-general – January 15, 1927

== Honours and awards ==
- Silver Cross of the Order of Virtuti Militari (1921)
- Commander's Cross with Star of the Order of Polonia Restituta, previously awarded the Commander's Cross and the Officer's Cross
- Cross of Independence
- Cross of Valour (six times)
- Gold Cross of Merit
- Commemorative Medal for War 1918-1921
- 10 Years of Independence medal
- Military Merit Medal (Austria-Hungary)
- Commander of the Legion of Honour
- Order of the Crown of Romania, 2nd class
