= Władysław Bończa-Uzdowski =

Polish Army brigadier general and sports activist

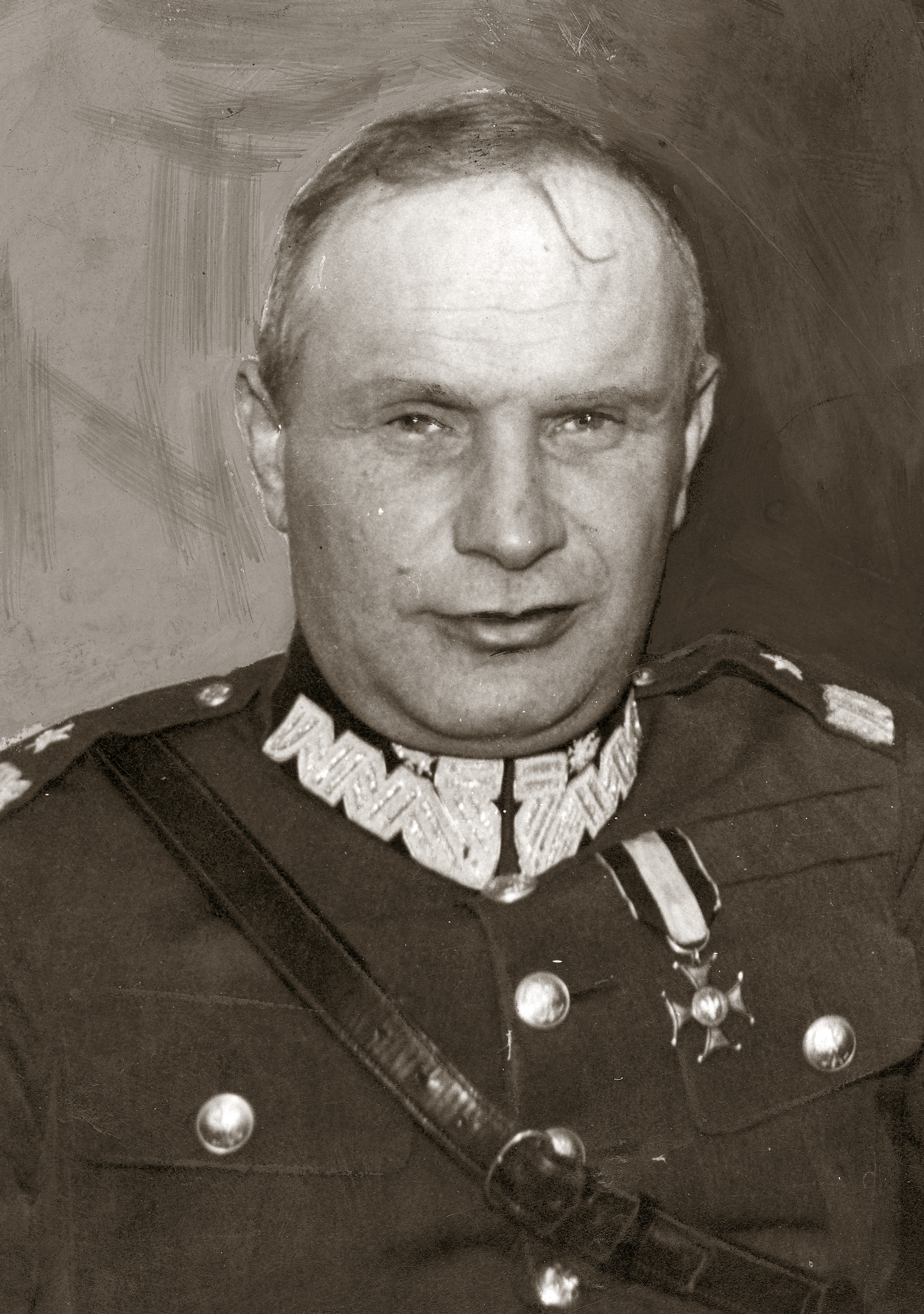
- General Władysław Bończa-Uzdowski
- Born: 23 August 1887; Podborcze, Russian Empire
- Died: 21 March 1957 (aged 69); Warsaw, Polish People's Republic
- Military career
- Allegiance: Austro-Hungary; Poland
- Branch: Austro-Hungarian Army; Polish Legions; Polish Army
- Service years: 1914–1945
- Rank: Generał brygady (Brigadier general)
- Commands: Commander of the 28th Infantry Division
- Conflicts: World War I Polish–Soviet War; World War II
- Awards

Wladyslaw Boncza-Uzdowski (August 23, 1887 – March 21, 1957) was a General brygady of the Polish Army and sports activist, general manager of the Polish Football Association.

Boncza-Uzdowski was born in the village of Podborcze near Chełm, Russian-controlled Congress Poland. In 1910, he joined Combat Organization of the Polish Socialist Party, he was also a member of the Union of Active Struggle and Riflemen's Association. In 1914, Boncza-Uzdowski joined Polish Legions in World War I, and after the Oath crisis of 1917, he was imprisoned in Beniaminow.

Boncza-Uzdowski fought in the Polish–Soviet War, as commandant of the 8th Legions Infantry Regiment. In 1926, he was named commander of infantry at the 3rd Legions Infantry Division, located in Zamość. On March 17, 1927, he was named commander of the 28th Infantry Division, located in Warsaw, and remained there until 1939. Furthermore, from January 15, 1928, until February 20, 1937, he was general manager of Polish Football Association.

On January 1, 1928, President Ignacy Mościcki promoted Boncza-Uzdowski to the rank of General brygady.

During the 1939 Invasion of Poland, the 28th Infantry Division, commanded by Boncza-Uzdowski, belonged to Łódź Army. On September 7, General Wiktor Thommee ordered Boncza-Uzdowski to take command of the 2nd Legions Infantry Division. On the next day, at app. 5 p.m., Boncza-Uzdowski appointed his deputy, Colonel Stefan Broniowski, new commander of the two divisions, and together with his chief of staff Albin Habina, and operational officer Jan Rzezniowiecki, left his headquarters, allegedly in search of General Juliusz Rómmel. Some Polish historians described this as an act of cowardice and treason.

On his way towards Gora Kalwaria, Boncza-Uzdowski entered the territory controlled by the Wehrmacht (in the night of September 8/9, near Mszczonow). After a two-day march, he crossed the Vistula by a boat, and headed towards Warsaw, reporting to general Rommel. On September 13, he again took command of the 28th I.D., fighting in the Battle of Modlin. Captured by the Germans on September 29, Boncza-Uzdowski spent the war at Oflag VII-A Murnau.

After returning to Poland in 1945, he was again named general manager of the Polish Football Association. Boncza-Uzdowski retired in 1949, and remained in Warsaw, where he died on March 21, 1957.

Boncza-Uzdowski was harshly criticized by other generals of the Polish Army. In April 1945, Juliusz Rómmel wrote in Murnau that he was a "worthless individual, without any commanding skills, and unfit for the military". In May 1939, Stefan Rowecki wrote of Boncza-Uzdowski: "He has commanded the division for ten years, and all he has done in the last five years, has been drinking, hunting and playing cards".

== Promotions ==
- Porucznik Legionów Polskich (First lieutenant of Polish Legions) - 1914
- Kapitan Legionów Polskich (Captain of Polish Legions) - 1915
- Major (Major)
- Podpułkownik (Lieutenant colonel) - 1920
- Pułkownik (Colonel) - 1922
- Generał brygady (Brigadier general) - 1928

== Awards and decorations ==
- Silver Cross of Virtuti Militari (1921)
- Commander's Cross of the Order of Polonia Restituta (8 November 1930)
- Cross of Independence with Swords (20 January 1931)
- Officer's Cross of the Order of Polonia Restituta (9 November 1926)
- Cross of Valour (four times)
- Gold Cross of Merit
- Commemorative Medal for the War of 1918–1921
- Medal of the 10th Anniversary of Regained Independence
- Order of Lāčplēsis, 3rd Class (Latvia, 1922)

== Sources ==
- M. Bielski, Grupa Operacyjna „Piotrków" 1939, Wydawnictwo Bellona, Warszawa 1991
- T. Kryska-Karski, S. Żurakowski, Generałowie Polski Niepodległej, Editions Spotkania, Warszawa 1991
