= Wapno =

- Village
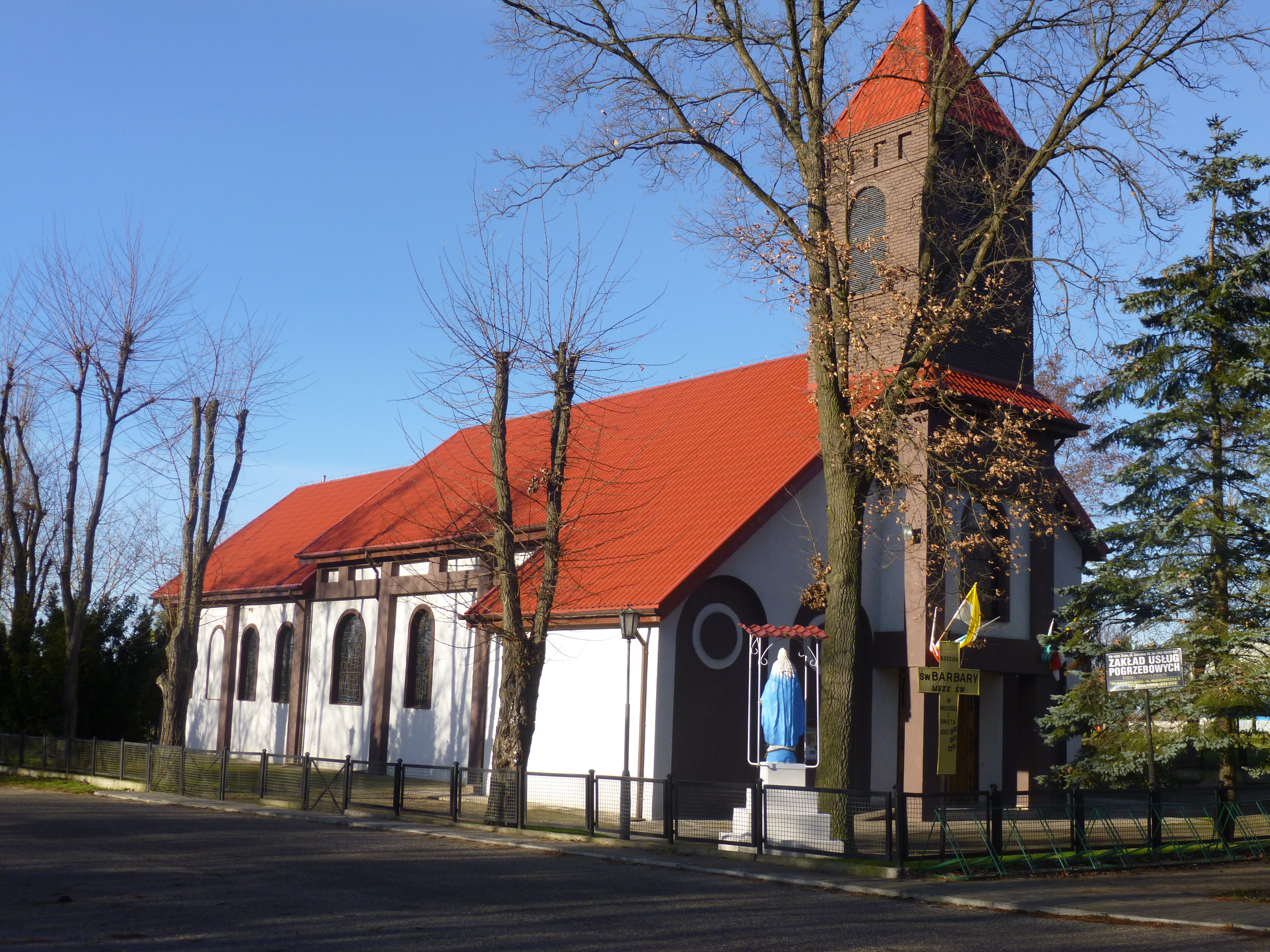
- Church of Saint Barbara

- Location within Poland
- Coordinates: 52°54′N 17°28′E
- Country: Poland
- Voivodeship: Greater Poland
- Powiat: Wągrowiec
- Gmina: Wapno

Population (2006)
  - Total: 1,700
- Time zone: UTC+1 (CET)
  - Summer (DST): UTC+2 (CEST)
- Postal code: 62-120
- Area code: +48 67
- Car Plates: PWA

Wapno [ˈvapnɔ] is a village in Wągrowiec County, in the Greater Poland Voivodeship, close to the border with Żnin County. Wapno is Polish for lime and reflects the large gypsum deposits in the area, which can be processed to produce lime. There are also large deposits of rock salt that were mined extensively beginning in the nineteenth century.

Wapno lies in the so-called Gniezno Lake District, and is close to several lakes. The village is 20 km (12 mi) north of the town of Wągrowiec.

== Municipal organization ==
The present municipality (gmina) of Wapno includes the following hamlets in addition to the central village of Wapno:

- Aleksandrowo
- Graboszewo
- Komasin
- Podolin
- Rusiec
- Srebrna Góra
- Stołężyn

== History ==
The town is first mentioned in 1299, in an entry in the Codex Diplomaticus Majoris Poloniae, which records the appearance of one Count Adam of Wapno at a trial in the court of one Count Rozal, concerning the rights of the Cistercian monastery in Łękno vis-a-vis the village of Dębogóra. At that time, Wapno was part of the Kuyavian principality headed by Duke Władyslaw I Łokietek (Vladislaus the Short), who became the second king of Poland upon his election in 1330.

Under Prussian rule, Wapno was part of South Prussia (1793–1807) and again of the Bromberg Region (1815–1919) in the Province of Posen (Prowincja Poznańska), interrupted only by it forming part of the Duchy of Warsaw. After World War I, it became part of the Second Polish Republic.

During the Invasion of Poland, the elementary school in Wapno served as the headquarters of the Polish 26th Infantry Division, a component of the Intervention Corps. Under the German Reichsgau Wartheland occupation (1939–1945), it was briefly (1944–1945) renamed Salzhof — "Saltyard." In 1945, Wapno once again became part of Poland.

Since mediaeval times, Wapno has been known for the quality of its gypsum, which was used in the construction of the cathedrals at Gniezno and Poznań. There are also large salt deposits, consisting of salt domes intruding through the gypsum layer in diapirism. The salt and gypsum deposits under Wapno were subject to increasingly intensive extraction from 1828 onward, when landowner Florian Wilkoński began exploratory surface mining.

Output increased from 200 tonnes per year at the beginning of modern mining, to over 5,000 tonnes per year in 1850, with the pace accelerating after the introduction of steam power in 1835. Output began increasing again in the 1950s, accompanied by the construction of housing for up to 3,000 workers. Gypsum was processed on site, whereas beginning in 1887, after the construction of a line connecting Wapno and Nakło to Gniezno, salt was transported by rail to Nakło for processing.

On September 28, 1977, the Tadeusz Koscziusko saltmine underneath the town center collapsed, forcing the evacuation of around 1,000 residents. Wapno has never recovered economically from the loss of mining jobs after the accident, which has never been fully explained.A 2014 study found that a likely cause of the accident was exploitation of resources at the tenth (and lowest) level of the mine, along with preparatory work at the eighth and ninth levels, which study authors called a "mistake," as room and pillar mining of rock salt tends to lead to the accumulation of fractures, fissures, and leaching of liquified sand and soil that lead to subsidence.
