= 37th Infantry Regiment (Poland) =

Military unit of Poland

37th Łęczyca Infantry Regiment
- 37 Łęczycki Pułk Piechoty
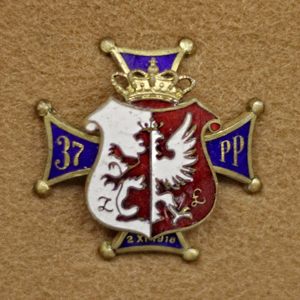
- Active: February 25, 1919–September 1939
- Country: Poland
- Type: Infantry
- Part of: 4th Infantry Division; 26th Infantry Division
- Garrison/HQ: Grodno, Ostrołęka (1920–1921); Kutno and Łęczyca (1921–1939); Powązki (1923)
- Patron: Józef Poniatowski
- Anniversaries: September 9 May 26
- Engagements: Polish–Ukrainian War; Polish–Soviet War: Battle of the Niemen River; World War II: Invasion of Poland; Battle of the Bzura

Commanders
- First commander: Lieutenant Colonel Adam Jaroszewski
- Last commander: Lieutenant Colonel Stanisław Kurcz

The 37th Łęczyca Infantry Regiment of Polish Armed Forces, named after Prince Józef Poniatowski, was a military unit that traced its heritage to the 4th Infantry Regiment of the Duchy of Warsaw. Its origins date back to November 1918 in Przemyśl, and it officially became the 37th Infantry Regiment on 25 February 1919. From 1920 to 1937, it was known as the 37th Łęczyca Infantry Regiment.

During the Polish–Ukrainian War, the regiment fought to open the route to the besieged Lviv, capturing Horodok and later participating in the battles for Sambir, Drohobych, and Stanyslaviv, as well as actions along the Dniester and Zbruch rivers. In the Polish–Soviet War, it engaged in battles under Korosten, Koziatyn, and Żukowiec, and fought on the Berezina, Neman, and Bug rivers. The regiment also participated in the victorious battle of Baboszewo in August 1920 and later took part in heavy fighting near Rohatyn and Vyshnivets during the advance toward Lviv.

In the May Coup of 1926, the regiment supported Marshal Józef Piłsudski during the battles in Warsaw.

In 1939, during the September Campaign, the regiment was part of the Poznań Army and later Pomeranian Army. It fought through Wągrowiec, Inowrocław, and the Kutno area, reaching the battlefield near the Bzura river, where it fought until September 18. The remnants of the regiment crossed the Bzura river, moving through the Kampinos Forest to Warsaw. After the September Campaign, the regiment was disbanded.

== Formation of the 37th Infantry Regiment and early combat ==
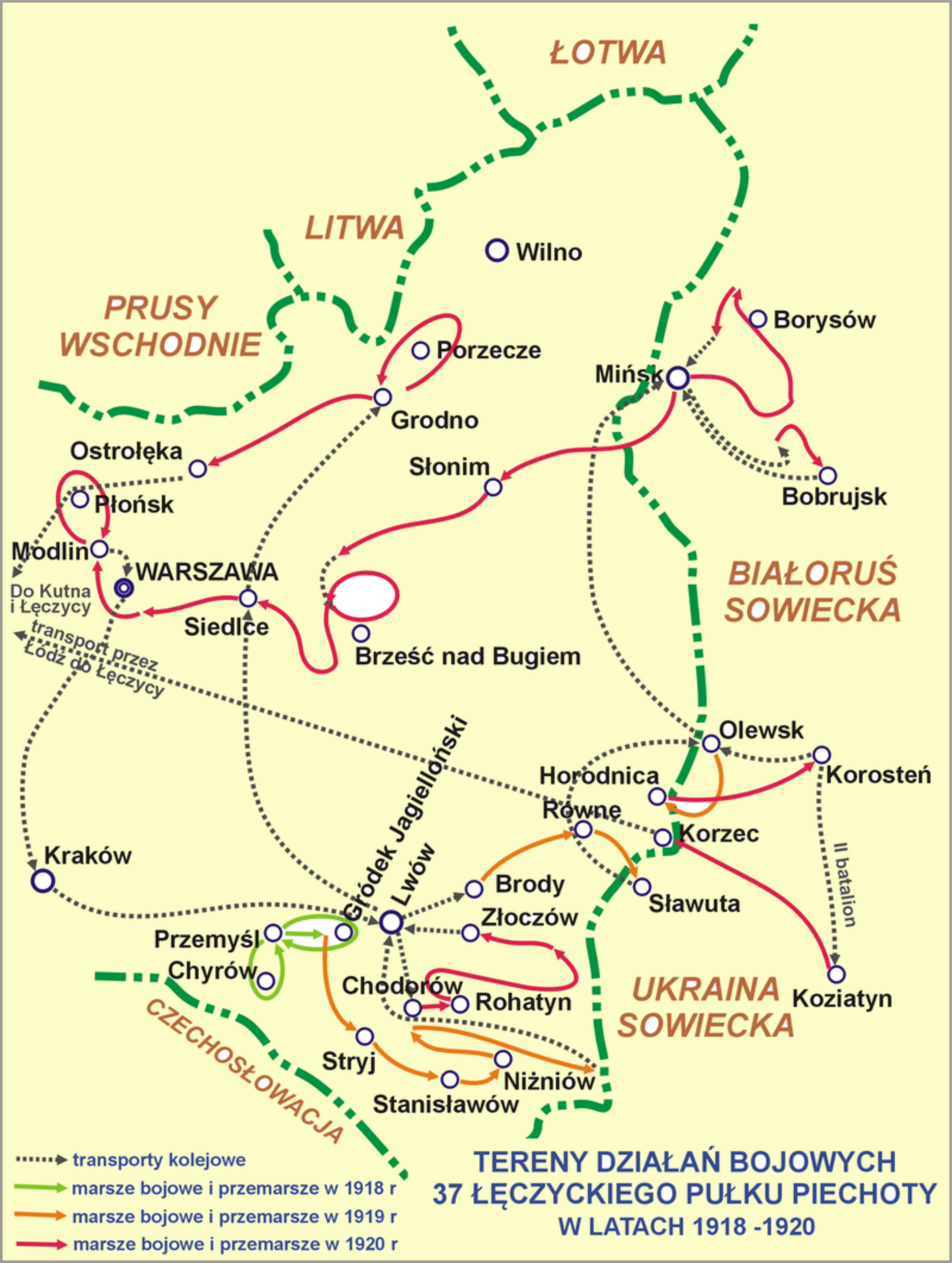
Military operations of the regiment (1918–1920)

After the collapse of Austria-Hungary on 28 October 1918, the Polish Liquidation Committee was formed in Kraków to organize Polish military and administrative structures in Galicia. On 1 November 1918, the Governing Council and Garrison Command were created in Przemyśl to begin organizing Polish military forces and administration. In the barracks of the former Austro-Hungarian 45th Infantry Regiment, scattered military units were gathered, forming the foundation for the 37th Infantry Regiment. The first commander of the regiment was Lieutenant Leon Kazubski, who had been released from a local prison on 3 November 1918. He became the commander of Polish forces and the garrison of Przemyśl on 5 November 1918.

By 7 November 1918, an infantry regiment was established in Przemyśl, which was renamed the 18th Rifle Regiment on November 9. The battalion commanders at that time were: 1st Battalion – Second Lieutenant Zając, 2nd Battalion – Second Lieutenant Dudziński, 3rd Battalion – Marian Doskowski. The regiment gained its first combat experience during clashes with Ukrainian forces from 9 to 11 November 1918 in the Zasań district of Przemyśl. On November 13, the regiment was renamed the 10th Infantry Regiment.

In November 1918, the regiment's reserve battalion, formerly part of the Austro-Hungarian 10th Infantry Regiment, was commanded by Captain Wilhelm Zwonarz, who was appointed as the temporary commander of the "Children of Przemyśl" 10th Infantry Regiment. On 30 November, Lieutenant Kazubski was replaced by Lieutenant Colonel Adam Jaroszewski as the commander of the regiment.

Part of the regiment fought to open the road to the besieged Lviv as part of Colonel Michał Tokarzewski-Karaszewicz's group, while the rest engaged in combat near Nyzhankovychi, Siedliska, Medyka, and Khyriv. The regiment captured Stodółki, Uhry, Czerlany, and Velykyi Liubin. It also held Horodok and defended the Lviv-Przemyśl railway line from Ukrainian forces.

On 25 February 1919, the regiment was renamed the 37th Infantry Regiment. In the spring of 1919, the regiment captured Sambir and Drohobych and participated in the conquest of Stanyslaviv. From 13 to 16 June 1919, it defended crossings over the Dniester river.

From June 28, the regiment fought along the Zbruch river, and in July 1919, it was transferred to the Volhynian front, where it battled Ukrainian units. From August 5, the regiment took on a defensive role. On 3 April 1920, Major Józef Kuś became the commander of the 37th Infantry Regiment.

In December 1919, the regiment's reserve battalion was stationed in Łęczyca.

=== Regimental personnel in 1920 ===
Position	Rank and name
Commander	Lieutenant Colonel Michał Remizowski
Adjutant	Second Lieutenant Alfred Łuczyński
Intelligence officer	Second Lieutenant Eugeniusz Fieldorf
Weapon officer	Second Lieutenant Ludwik Sklenarz
Communication officer	Second Lieutenant Bronisław Sitarski
Supply officer	Second Lieutenant Adolf Kozubal
Doctor	Second Lieutenant Dr. Mieczysław Henoch
Chaplain	Father Tadeusz Borzęcki
Transport commander	Second Lieutenant Marian Bukowski
Assault company commander	Second Lieutenant Otton Jiruszka
1st battalion commander	Captain Franciszek Gwizdak
Adjutant	Second Lieutenant Franciszek Kielar
Doctor	Second Lieutenant Dr. Józef Eisenbruch
1st company commander	Second Lieutenant Jan Wójciak (killed on September 9)
Platoon leader	Second Lieutenant Bronisław Nowakowski
2nd company commander	Second Lieutenant Aram Mantel
3rd company commander	Second Lieutenant Józef Markiel (killed on September 7)
Platoon leader	Second Lieutenant Zachariasz Rucker
Platoon leader	Second Lieutenant Kazimierz Wacławski
4th company commander	Second Lieutenant Roman Szlapa
Platoon leader	Second Lieutenant Roman Wojnar
1st machine gun company commander	Second Lieutenant Antoni Kulesza
Platoon leader	Second Lieutenant Jan Koszykiewicz
2nd battalion commander	Second Lieutenant Marian Żelnio, later Captain Michał Drzystek
Adjutant	Second Lieutenant Michał Maćkowiak
Logistics officer	Second Lieutenant Władysław Maryniak
Supply officer	Second Lieutenant Rudolf Linscheid
Doctor	Second Lieutenant Dr. Jan Czernik
5th company commander	Second Lieutenant Wojciech Gil
6th company commander	Second Lieutenant Michał Ciesielski
Platoon leader	Second Lieutenant Bernard Tepper
7th company commander	Second Lieutenant Beniamin Kotarba
Platoon leader	Second Lieutenant Filip Feli
8th company commander	Second Lieutenant Jerzy Tramer
Platoon leader	Second Lieutenant Bogusław Bilik (killed on September 10)
2nd machine gun company commander	Second Lieutenant Alfred Rycerz
Platoon leader	Second Lieutenant Franciszek Gęsior
3rd battalion commander	Major Józef Kuś
Adjutant	Second Lieutenant Mieczysław Kowalski
Supply officer	Second Lieutenant Władysław Rogalski
Doctor	Second Lieutenant San. Stanisław Komarnicki
9th company commander	Second Lieutenant Roman Leeg (killed on September 7)
Platoon leader	Second Lieutenant Karol Rydel
10th company commander	Second Lieutenant Jan Dyszkiewicz
Platoon leader	Second Lieutenant Tadeusz Szymański
11th company commander	Second Lieutenant Stanisław Kukla
12th company commander	Second Lieutenant Jan Szymański
3rd machine gun company commander	Second Lieutenant Mieczysław Jus
Regimental officer	Officer Candidate Józef Cajgier (killed on September 12)

== Participation in the Polish–Soviet War ==
The regiment was part of the 4th Infantry Division, tasked with capturing the city of Korosten during the Polish offensive. The 37th Infantry Regiment secured the railway junction and other designated areas, then fortified its position, remaining in reserve until Kyiv was taken.

Due to the Soviet counteroffensive, the 1st and 3rd Battalions moved to the Berezina river on 21 May 1920, holding off Soviet attacks toward Minsk. The regiment inflicted significant losses in battles at Borowina and Zhukovets (26 May 1920). Until 7 June 1920, it fought along the Berezina, engaging in battles at Murava, Chernivtsi, and Wielki Stachów (3 June 1920). From there, the regiment marched through Zamosze, Zawidne, and Minsk to the Grodzianka station. A week later, it was transported to the Ratmirovicze station and subordinated to the commander of the 14th Infantry Division for planned operations near Bobruisk. However, these actions were canceled due to a breach in the front by the Bolsheviks, prompting a retreat on 7 July 1920.

Some units retreated to Miratycze via Minsk and the Neman river. After attempting to take Slonim, the 1st and 3rd Battalions withdrew west with the 4th Infantry Division. Under Captain Mieczysław Jus, the 3rd Battalion captured Kamyenyets and, after fierce fighting near Wierzchy, reached Stawy near the Bug river, reuniting with the 1st Battalion. The battalions soon separated again, with the 1st joining the 8th Infantry Brigade and the 3rd joining the 2nd Cavalry Brigade reserve. On 4 August 1920, the regiment achieved successes in pushing Bolsheviks across the Bug during the 4th Army’s counteroffensive. The regiment was then withdrawn to the Siedlce area.

The 2nd Battalion, under Lieutenant Beniamin Kotarba, had been detached from the regiment since 21 May 1920. Initially stationed in Korosten, it retreated to Koziatyn and later participated in an ultimately unsuccessful assault on Korets. Under pressure from the Soviets, particularly Semyon Budyonny's 1st Cavalry Army, the 2nd Battalion, acting as a rear guard, was encircled and destroyed. 10 officers and 374 soldiers were killed or captured. The remnants of the battalion regrouped in Siedlce on 22 July 1920 and later reorganized in Łęczyca and Kutno. On 13 August 1920, the battalion joined the 1st and 3rd Battalions in Góra Kalwaria.

While the Battle of Warsaw concluded with a decisive Polish victory and Polish forces pursued the retreating enemy, heavy fighting continued on the southern front near Lviv. To prevent a potential Soviet offensive, the 4th Infantry Division, including the 37th Regiment, was transferred to the Chodorów area. On 7 September 1920, the regiment engaged in intense battles with Soviet units threatening the Lviv–Chodorów railway line, capturing Knihynicze, Nowosielce, and Okrześnice. The next day, the regiment crossed the Stryi river, aiming to secure Rohatyn, which it achieved on 9 September 1920.

The regiment commemorated the Rohatyn battle, its first in the Polish–Soviet War where all battalions fought together, by designating September 9 as its regimental holiday. Over the following days, it continued defending Rohatyn from Soviet counterattacks. Reinforced with three marching companies on September 13, the regiment, as part of the 4th Infantry Division, pursued the enemy to Vyshnivets. On September 25, it was transported to Grodno as a reserve unit for the high command. Redirected by the 2nd Legion Infantry Division, the regiment moved via Grodno and Łomża to Ostrołęka on 12 November 1920. It served in border protection there until 28 April 1921, after which it returned to Kutno and Łęczyca.

== Recipients of the Virtuti Militari Order ==
Order Virtuti Militari Soldiers of the 37th Infantry Regiment awarded the Silver Cross of the Virtuti Militari for their service during the 1918–1921 war
Sergeant Marian Danielewicz	Sergeant Henryk Daszkowski	Lieutenant Franciszek Dudziński
† Colonel Adam Jaroszewski (8022)	Sergeant Karol Jelonek	Captain Mieczysław Jus
Sergeant Roch Konarski	† Lieutenant Józef Kowalski (8023)	Second Lieutenant Antoni Kulesza
Lieutenant Stanisław Kukla	Corporal Wincenty Landa	† Lieutenant Józef Markiel (8024)
Second Lieutenant Władysław Nosowicz	Lieutenant Bolesław Pędzikiewicz (4504)	Lieutenant Władysław Pokorny
Lieutenant Colonel Michał Remizowski	† Second Lieutenant Kazimierz Schaller (8026)	Corporal Jan Siusta
Sergeant Tomasz Smyczyński	Lieutenant Bolesław Feliks Stachoń	Captain Władysław Starzecki
Lieutenant Roman Szłapa	Senior Sergeant Ludwik Szuba	Lieutenant Jerzy Tramer
Lieutenant Czesław Wawrosz	† Cadet Officer Kazimierz Winiarski (8027)	Corporal Jan Wójcik
† Lieutenant Jan Wójciak (8028)		

== Regiment in peacetime ==
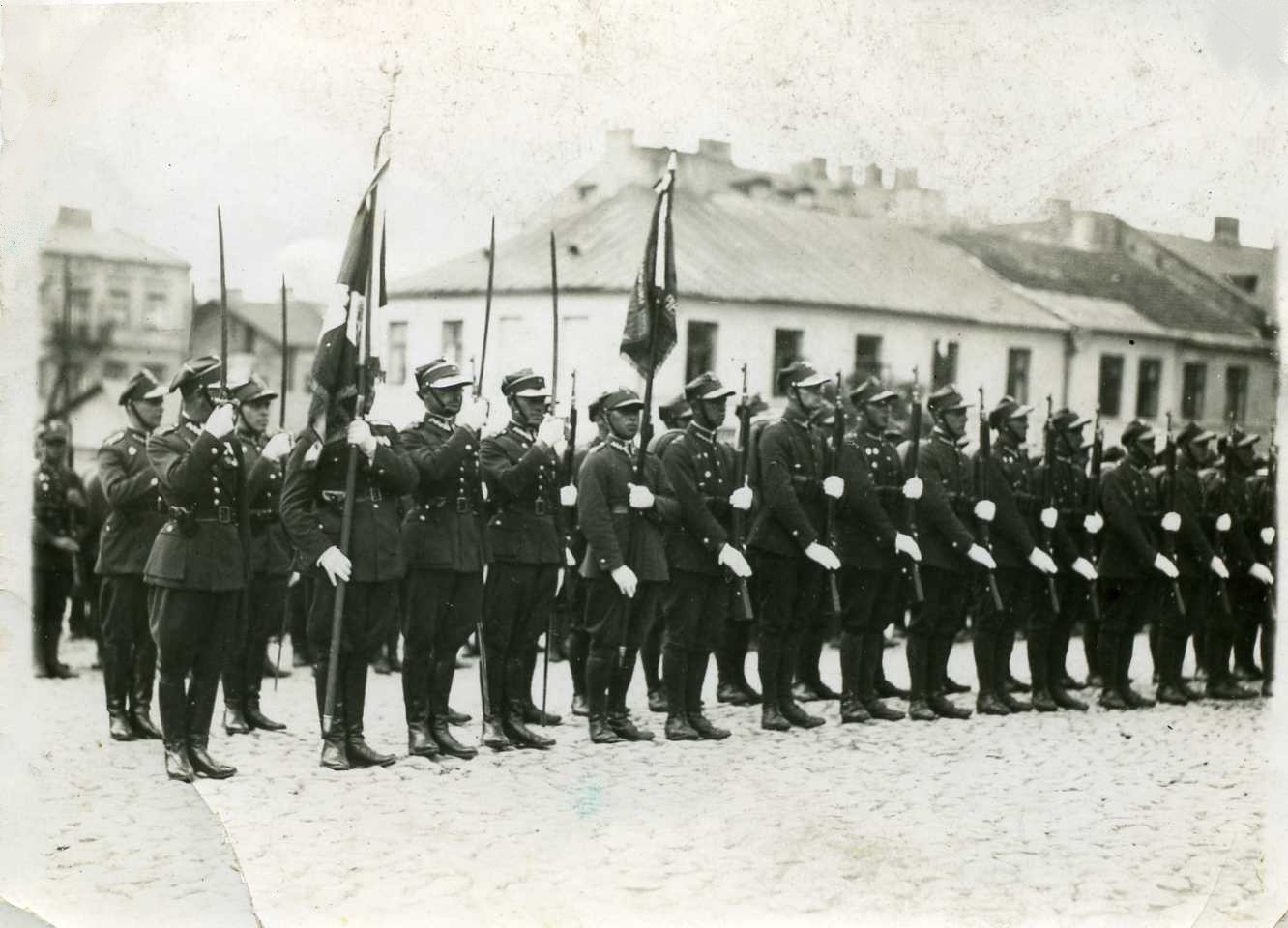
Honor guard with a new banner, alongside the banner of the Scouting Assault Company of the 37th Infantry Regiment

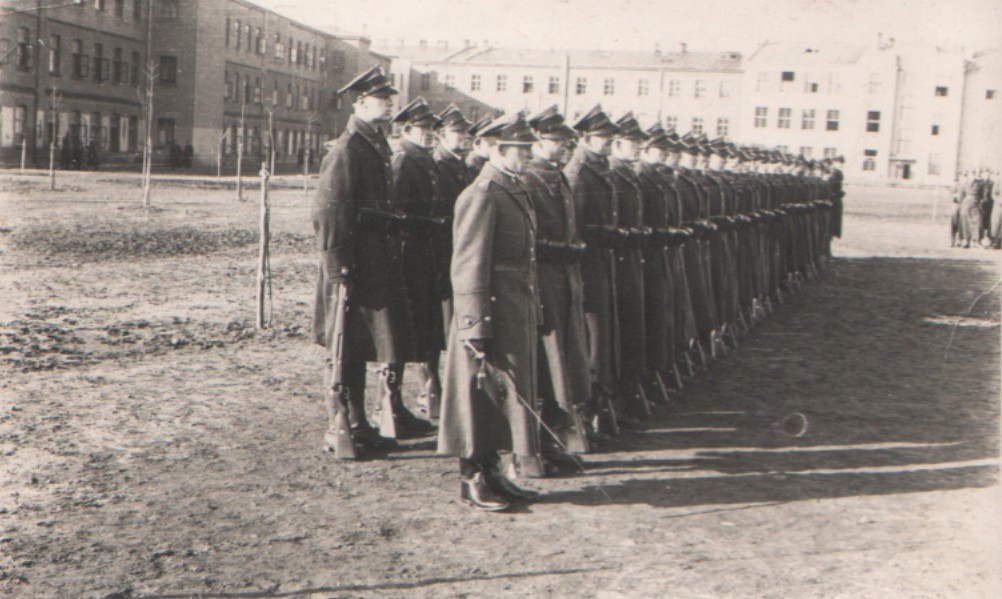
Regiment's courtyard in the 1930s

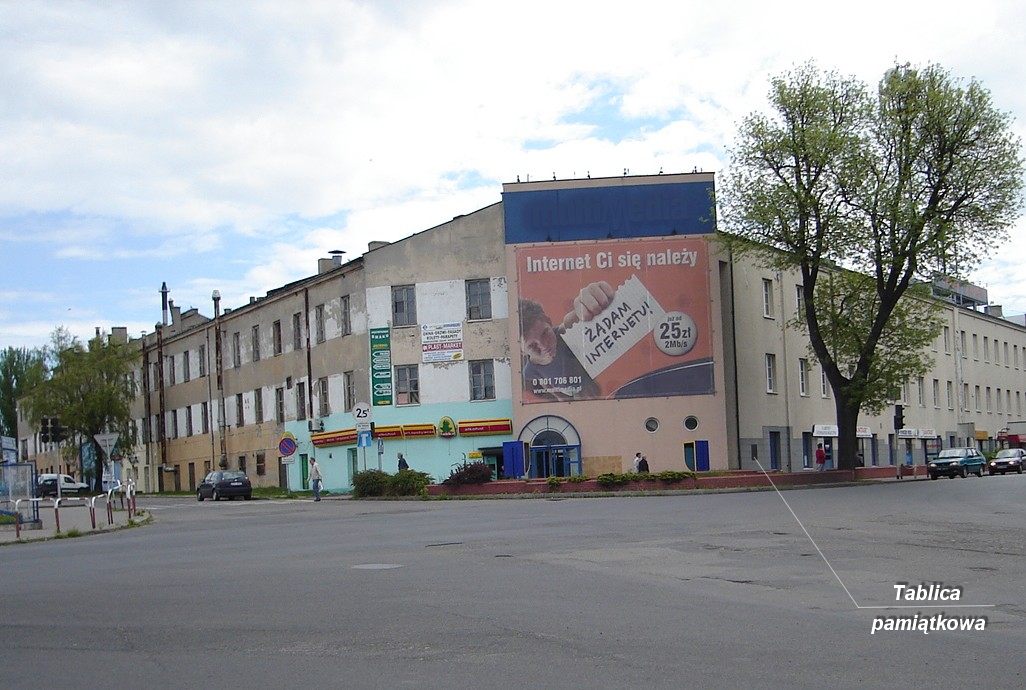
Buildings of the former barracks of the 37th Infantry Regiment in Kutno

The regiment’s headquarters, staff, and battalions I and II were stationed in the Kutno area of Corps District IV, occupying the former Russian 4th Rifle Regiment’s barracks. The III Battalion was quartered in Łęczyca in a former monastery building. The barracks were cramped and lacked many basic facilities, including a sewage system, exercise grounds, proper storage, and a shooting range, which was only 100 meters long. In late 1921, the regiment's assignment changed, and it was incorporated into the 26th Infantry Division (alongside the 10th Infantry Regiment, 18th Infantry Regiment, and 26th Light Artillery Regiment), an arrangement that remained until the outbreak of World War II. Among the annual recruits, a significant percentage were illiterate, prompting the regiment to organize an educational program conducted by professional officers and non-commissioned officers. The regiment's holiday was initially celebrated on 9 September to commemorate the victory at Rohatyn, but from 1934, it was celebrated on May 26, marking the victorious battle at Żukowiec in 1920.

Amid social tensions, the regiment was stationed in Warsaw from October to December 1923 (at the former Russian warehouses in Powązki), performing guard duties.

A significant event in the regiment’s history was its participation in Marshal Józef Piłsudski's May Coup. Most of the regiment, commanded by Colonel Władysław Bortnowski, supported the Marshal. On the afternoon of 13 May 1926, battalions I and II arrived in Warsaw by train and engaged in combat with government forces in Mokotów and the city center. During the transport and at the unloading site, the units were bombarded by aviation. Nine soldiers died in the clashes: Sergeant Michał Łuc, Corporal Jan Iwan, Private First Class Jan Moskaluk, Private First Class Wacław Złotowski, and Privates Józef Cholewa, Lajzer Gutenberg, Leon Siermiński, Wilhelm Tom, and Szurek Kalman. Thirty-two soldiers were wounded.

Following the 1930 executive order by the Ministry of Military Affairs to the Infantry Department on peacetime infantry organization (PS 10-50), three types of infantry regiments were introduced into the Polish Armed Forces. The 37th Infantry Regiment was classified as a Type I ("normal") infantry regiment. It received approximately 610 recruits annually. Its personnel comprised 56 officers and 1,500 non-commissioned officers and soldiers. During winter, the regiment operated with a senior-year battalion, a training battalion, and a skeleton battalion, while in summer, it comprised a senior-year battalion and two conscript battalions. After the reorganization in 1930, the regiment also trained recruits for the Border Protection Corps.

Personnel and organizational structure of March 1939 (Note: The list contains the personnel of the unit according to its status immediately before the mobilization of the first Polish military units on 23 March 1939, but after the last promotions, which were announced on 19 March 1939 (Rybka & Stepan (2006, p. 6)).)
Position	Rank and name
Command
Regiment commander	Lieutenant Colonel Roman Umiastowski
I deputy commander	Lieutenant Colonel Stanisław Ignacy Kurcz
Adjutant	Lieutenant Zygmunt Klekowicki
Senior doctor	Lieutenant Colonel Doctor Józef Michał Kuś
Junior doctor	vacant
At the commander’s disposal	Major Józef Mandzenko
II deputy commander (quartermaster)	Major Jan Władysław Smoter
Mobilization officer	Captain Stanisław Skierski
Deputy mobilization officer	Captain Teodor Dziedzic
Administrative-material officer	Lieutenant Kazimierz Blajer
Logistics officer	Captain Jakub Król
Food officer	Lieutenant Jan Strzelecki
Transport officer	Lieutenant Jan Wojtal
Bandmaster	Lieutenant Eugeniusz Wiltos
Signal platoon commander	Lieutenant Julian Henryk Dzięciołowski
Pioneer platoon commander	Lieutenant Stanisław Synoradzki
Infantry artillery platoon commander	Captain Piotr Kamiński
Anti-tank platoon commander	Lieutenant Stanisław Kaczor
Reconnaissance unit commander	Second Lieutenant Damian Edward Silski
I battalion
Battalion commander	Major Stanisław Molenda
1st company commander	Lieutenant Antoni Sawczenko
Platoon commander	Second Lieutenant Stanisław Janusz Purr
2nd company commander	Captain Leon Owadiuk
Platoon commander	Second Lieutenant Eugeniusz Bronisław Iwański
Platoon commander	Second Lieutenant Rudolf Józef König
3rd company commander	Lieutenant Jerzy Grabski
Platoon commander	Second Lieutenant Jan Józef Urbański
1st machine gun company commander	Captain Witold Marian Jachimowicz
Platoon commander	Second Lieutenant Franciszek Kuncyusz
II battalion
Battalion commander	vacant
4th company commander	Captain Henryk Leon Machnowski
Platoon commander	Second Lieutenant Leopold Jan Karol Manz
45h company commander	Captain Brunon Kaliński
Platoon commander	Lieutenant Wiktor Mikiszko
Platoon commander	Lieutenant Stanisław Bronisław Sabor
Platoon commander	Second Lieutenant Albin Mrall
6th company commander	Captain Zygmunt Gajewski
Platoon commander	Lieutenant Edward Mataczyński
Platoon commander	Second Lieutenant Władysław Olkowski
2nd machine gun company commander	Acting Lieutenant Lieutenant Marian Sroka
Platoon commander	Second Lieutenant Jerzy Krünes
III battalion
Battalion commander	Major Henryk Tomasz Reymann
7th company commander	Captain Mieczysław Bobrownicki-Libchen
Platoon commander	Lieutenant Stefan Szczepan Jerzy Miller
8th company commander	Lieutenant Wacław Kieża
Platoon commander	Second Lieutenant Roman Jan Mazur
9th company commander	Captain Mieczysław Antoni Roszkiewicz
Platoon commander	Second Lieutenant Eugeniusz Jaworski
Platoon commander	Second Lieutenant Teodor Szwacki
3rd machine gun company commander	Captain Józef Kozieł
On course	Second Lieutenant Adam Tadeusz Podolak
On course	Captain Józef II Tenerowicz
On course	Lieutenant Władysław Kozal
37th District of Military Training "Kutno"
District commander	Major Józef Kazimierz Skwarnicki
County commander (Kutno)	Lieutenant Jerzy Gajewski
County commander (Łęczyca)	Captain Stanisław Stefaniak

== Regimental symbols ==
=== Standards ===
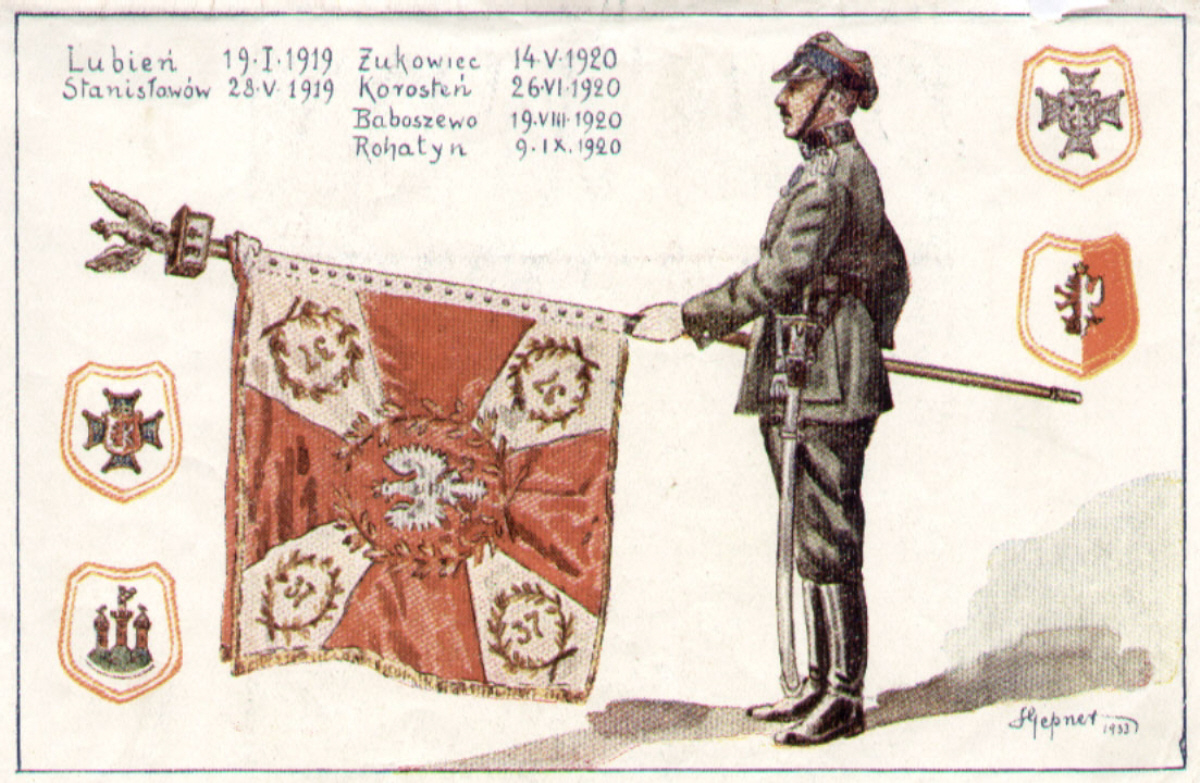
Soldier of the 37th Regiment with the standard

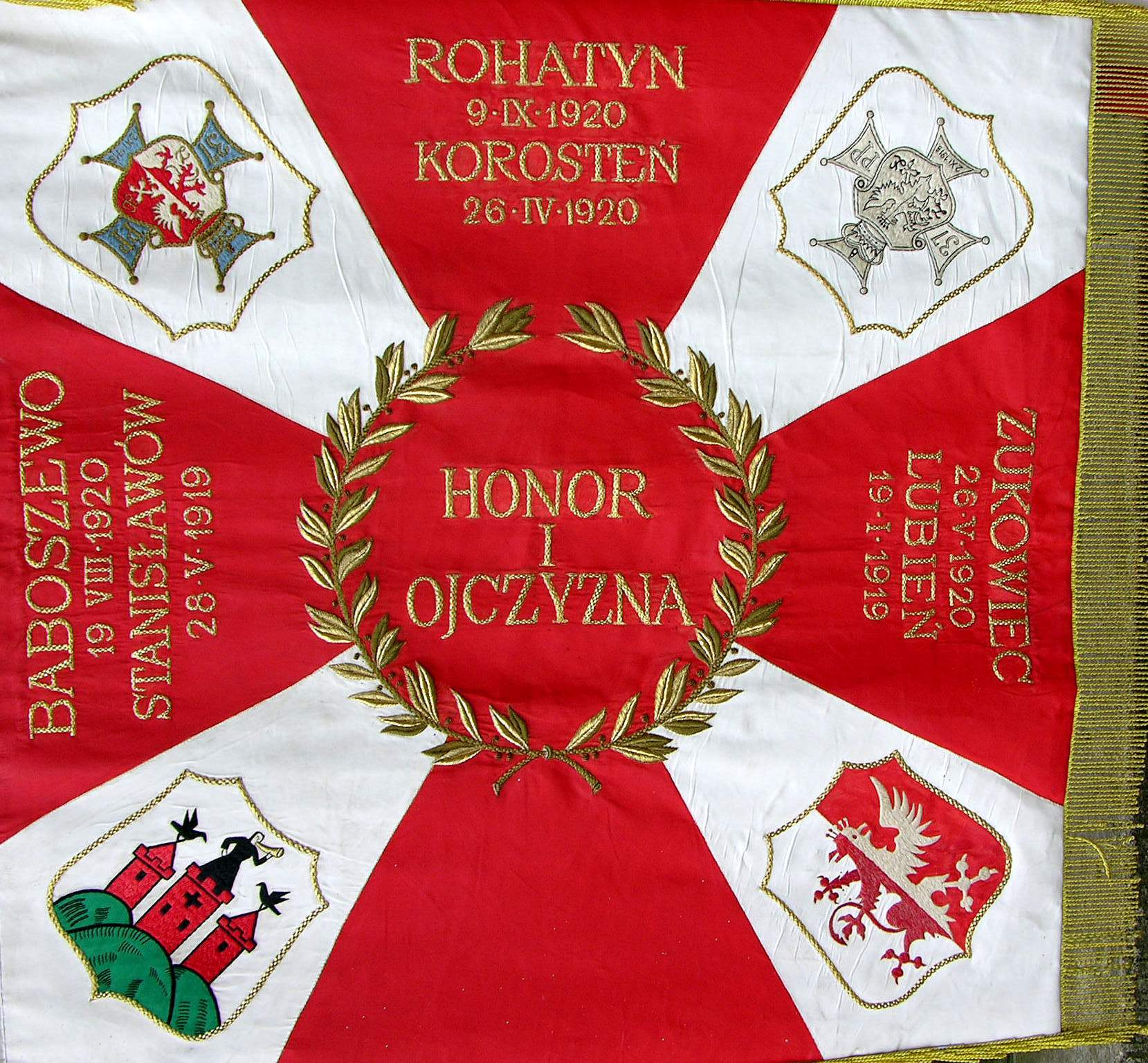

A "banner committee" was formed by the residents of the Łęczyca Land, which obtained permission to name the regiment the 37th Łęczyca Infantry Regiment and funded a banner. The ceremony of its presentation took place on 23 May 1920. At that time, the regiment was in the field, so the banner was received by a delegation of officers, non-commissioned officers, and privates from the hands of the Minister of Military Affairs, General Józef Leśniewski. Until the regiment returned from the war, the banner was stored at the reserve battalion command. In 1921, on the regimental holiday, the banner was decorated with an insignia funded by the citizens of Kutno and the Kutno branch of the Red Cross, in the form of a silver ring with the Kutno coat of arms and an appropriate inscription. In July 1933, it was transferred to the Polish Army Museum.

On 26 June 1933, during a ceremony at the Piaski sports field in Kutno, President Ignacy Mościcki presented the regiment with a new banner, funded by the citizens of the Łęczyca Land. The banner's godparents were the Łódź Voivode Aleksander Hauke-Nowak and Mrs. Maria Pajdakowa, wife of the Łęczyca County Starosta Zygmunt Pajdak. On 28 January 1938, the regimental banner began to be officially referred to as the standard. During the Battle of the Bzura, near Iłów, the standard was handed over for safekeeping to a local farmer, and its whereabouts have remained unknown since then.

=== Commemorative insignia ===
On 22 December 1928, the Minister of Military Affairs, Marshal Józef Piłsudski, approved the design and regulations for the commemorative insignia of the 37th Infantry Regiment. The insignia, measuring 43x43 mm, is in the shape of the Virtuti Militari Cross, with the arms enameled in navy blue. A shield with the coat of arms of Łęczyca Land is placed on the cross, inscribed with the initials ZŁ. The shield is topped with a crown. The arms of the cross bear the regiment’s number and initials 37 PP, as well as its formation date 3 XI 1918. The officer's insignia is two-part, made from gilded and silver-plated tombac, and enameled. The designers of the insignia were Paweł Bobkowicz and Bronisław Grabski, both from Łódź. During the regimental holiday on 9 September 1931, the insignia was awarded to officers and allied units: the 10th Infantry Regiment, 18th Infantry Regiment, 4th Field Artillery Regiment, and 26th Field Artillery Regiment.

== Soldiers of the regiment ==
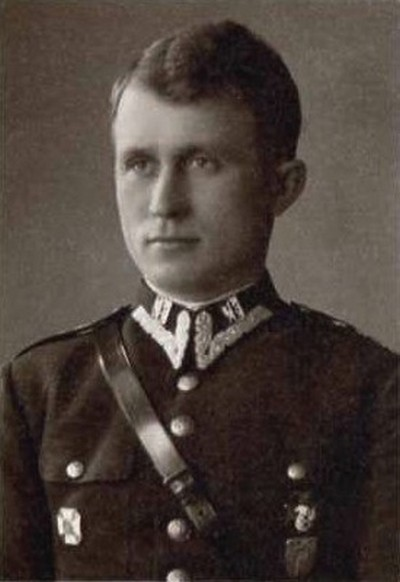
Stanisław Synoradzki – platoon commander of pioneers

=== Regimental commanders ===
Source: (Note: The regimental commander personally oversaw the training of officers and was responsible for combat readiness, overall training, logistical services, and the internal affairs of the regiment (Firich (1923, p. 49)).)

- 2nd Lieutenant Leon Kazubski (approx. 7–30 November 1918)
- Colonel Adam Jaroszewski (30 November 1918 – 1 July 1919)
- Major Józef II Kuś (5 July – 18 August 1919)
- Colonel Adam Jaroszewski (19 August – 9 September 1919)
- Major Józef II Kuś (10 September 1919 – 2 January 1920)
- Colonel Adam Jaroszewski (3 January – 19 March 1920)
- Captain Karol Koziarowski (20 March – 3 April 1920)
- Major Józef II Kuś (4 April – 16 May 1920)
- Captain Michał Remizowski (17 May – 6 June 1920)
- Major Józef II Kuś (7–13 June 1920)
- Lieutenant Colonel Michał Remizowski (14 August 1920 – 16 March 1925)
- Lieutenant Colonel Albin Skroczyński (acting, 16 March – 3 May 1925)
- Lieutenant Colonel Julian Żaba (acting, 4 May – 25 July 1925)
- Lieutenant Colonel Albin Skroczyński (26 July – 9 October 1925)
- Colonel Edward Nowak (10 – 30 October 1925)
- Lieutenant Colonel Albin Skroczyński (acting, 16 March – 3 May 1925)
- Major Stefan Lewicki (acting, 31 October – 1 December 1925)
- Lieutenant Colonel Albin Skroczyński (acting, 2 – 30 December 1925)
- Colonel Władysław Bortnowski (31 December 1925 – 19 June 1926)
- Lieutenant Colonel Albin Skroczyński (acting, 20 June – 7 September 1926)
- Colonel Jerzy Trojanowski (8 September 1926 – 31 December 1930)
- Major Jan Palewicz (acting, 1 – 15 January 1931)
- Colonel Józef Sas-Hoszowski (16 January 1931 – 2 September 1937)
- Lieutenant Colonel Roman Umiastowski (3 September 1937 – March 1939)
- Lieutenant Colonel Stanisław Ignacy Kurcz (March – 19 September 1939)

=== Deputy commanders ===
- Lieutenant Colonel Wiktor Łapicki (10 July 1922 – 1923)
- Lieutenant Colonel Julian Żaba (1924)
- Lieutenant Colonel Albin Skroczyński (January 1925 – 24 July 1928 → commander of 64th Infantry Regiment)
- Lieutenant Colonel Stanisław Trzebunia (24 July 1928 – 12 March 1929 → commander of Kutno Recruitment Area Command)
- Lieutenant Colonel Józef II Kuś (12 March 1929 – 31 March 1930 → commander of Równe Recruitment Area Command)
- Major Jan Palewicz (acting, 31 March 1930 – 23 March 1932 → conscription training in Jarosław Recruitment Area Command)
- Lieutenant Colonel Julian Dadlez (23 March 1932 – 1937 → commander of Rawa Ruska Recruitment Area Command)
- Lieutenant Colonel Stanisław Ignacy Kurcz (until March 1939 → commander of 37th Infantry Regiment)
  - Quartermaster (Second Deputy)
- Major Jan Władysław Smoter

=== Soldiers of the 37th Infantry Regiment – victims of the Katyn Massacre ===
Further details on the soldiers' biographies can be accessed through resources provided by the Ministry of Culture and National Heritage and the Katyn Museum.

Name	Rank	Profession	Pre-mobilization workplace	Place of execution
Jan Bejgier	Second Lieutenant (Reserve)	Teacher	School in Pilichówek	Katyn
Mieczysław Bigoszewski	Second Lieutenant (Reserve)	Lawyer		Katyn
Kazimierz Feliga	Second Lieutenant (Reserve)	Teacher	School in Ciachcin	Katyn
Piotr Jankowski	Second Lieutenant (Reserve)	Teacher	School No. 17 in Łódź	Katyn
Stanisław Kodymowski	Second Lieutenant (Reserve)	Teacher	School in Krośniewice	Katyn
Jakub Landsberg	Second Lieutenant (Reserve)	Physician		Katyn
Wiktor Mikurda	Second Lieutenant (Reserve)	Mechanical technician		Katyn
Stanisław Okoński	Second Lieutenant (Reserve)	Clerk	Post Office in Sulejów	Katyn
Roman Orłowski	Second Lieutenant (Reserve)	Teacher	Headmaster in Chojnice	Katyn
Teodor Orzechowski	Second Lieutenant (Reserve)			Katyn
Edmund Pawłowski	Second Lieutenant (Reserve)	Teacher	School in Lućmierz	Katyn
Czesław Zapłata	Second Lieutenant (Reserve)	Agricultural technician	Świerczyn Estate	Katyn
Roman Zwierzchowski	Second Lieutenant (Reserve)	Teacher	School in Strachnów	Katyn
Henryk Bednarek	Second Lieutenant (Reserve)	Mechanical technician	Elektrobudowa Company in Łódź	Kharkiv
Jerzy Fidala	Lieutenant (Reserve)			Kharkiv
Roman Jędrzejczak	Second Lieutenant (Reserve)	Technician	Polish State Railways in Poznań	Kharkiv
Józef Komicz	Lieutenant (Reserve)	Agricultural technician	Landowner	Kharkiv
Tadeusz Kozłowski	Second Lieutenant (Reserve)	Teacher	Primary School	Kharkiv
Józef Kuś	Lieutenant Colonel (Doctor of Medicine)	Career soldier	Senior Doctor of the 37th Regiment	Kharkiv
Wacław Pakulski	Second Lieutenant (Reserve)	Teacher	School in Bodzanów	Kharkiv
Marian Skibiński	Second Lieutenant (Reserve)	Merchant		Kharkiv

== Bibliography ==
- "Dziennik Personalny" [Personnel Journal]. Polska Zbrojna (in Polish). Warsaw: Ministerstwo Spraw Wojskowych. 1930.
- Adamowski, Mieczysław (1929). "Początki 37 P. P. – listopad 1918 r. / Fragmenty wrażeń i epizody listopadowe" [The Beginnings of the 37th Infantry Regiment – November 1918 / Fragments of Impressions and November Episodes]. Jednodniówka 37 P. P. [One-Day Chronicle of the 37th Infantry Regiment] (in Polish). Przemyśl: D. O. K.
- Firich, Karol (1923). "Almanach oficerski na rok 1923/24" [Officers' Almanac for the Year 1923/24]. Biblioteka Uniwersytecka W Poznaniu (in Polish). Warsaw: Wojskowy Instytut Naukowo-Wydawniczy.
- Jagiełło, Zdzisław (2007). Piechota Wojska Polskiego 1918–1939 [Infantry of the Polish Army 1918–1939] (in Polish). Warsaw: Bellona. ISBN 978-83-11-10206-4.
- Kozubal, Adolf (1929). Zarys historji wojennej 37-go pułku piechoty Ziemi Łęczyckiej [Outline of the Military History of the 37th Infantry Regiment of the Łęczyca Land] (in Polish). Warsaw: Wojskowe Biuro Historyczne.
- Kukuła, Piotr Aleksander (1977). Piechurzy kutnowskiego pułku [Infantrymen of the Kutno Regiment] (in Polish). Łódź: Wydawnictwo Łódzkie.
- Rybka, Ryszard; Stepan, Kamil (2006). Rocznik oficerski 1939. Stan na dzień 23 marca 1939 [Officers' Yearbook 1939. As of 23 March 1939] (in Polish). Kraków: Fundacja Centrum Dokumentacji Czynu Niepodległościowego. ISBN 83-7188-899-6.
- Sawicki, Zdzisław; Wielechowski, Adam (2007). Odznaki Wojska Polskiego 1918–1945: Katalog Zbioru Falerystycznego: Wojsko Polskie 1918–1939: Polskie Siły Zbrojne na Zachodzie [Badges of the Polish Army 1918–1945: Catalog of the Phaleristic Collection: Polish Army 1918–1939: Polish Armed Forces in the West] (in Polish). Warsaw: Pantera Books. ISBN 978-83-204-3299-2.
- Zieliński, Hugo (1934). Oswobodzenie Przemyśla w listopadzie 1918 roku (Zarys) [The Liberation of Przemyśl in November 1918 (Outline)] (in Polish). Warsaw: Wojskowe Biuro Historyczne.
