= Intervention Corps =

The Intervention Corps (Polish language: Korpus Interwencyjny) was a tactical unit of the Polish Armed Forces of the Second Polish Republic. It did not exist in the peacetime organization of the Polish Army, and was created for specific purposes only. Its task was to intervene in special circumstances, both inside Poland and outside of the country.

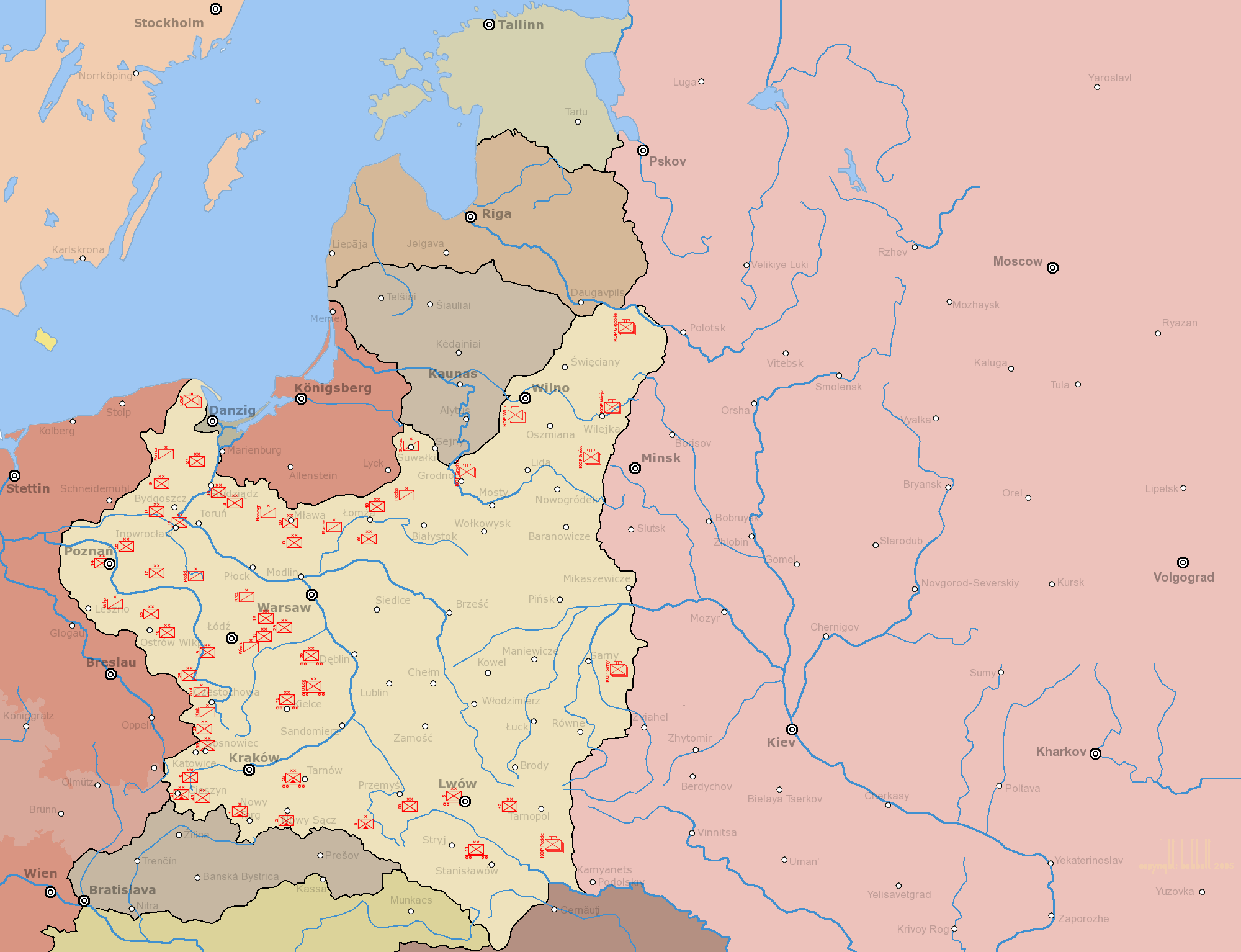
Placement of Polish divisions on September 1, 1939

== Composition ==
According to the Mobilization Plan W, prepared for the war with the Soviet Union (see Plan East), the following units were designed to form the Intervention Corps:

- 26th Infantry Division from Skierniewice,
- 28th Infantry Division from Warsaw,
- 10th Motorized Cavalry Brigade from Rzeszów.

Furthermore, some artillery, armored and motorized regiments were to be added to the Corps, as well as three armored trains, engineer platoons and military police regiments. The Mobilization Plan W was completed on May 1, 1938, but its details have not been preserved.

== Operational history ==
On March 22, 1939, Marshall Edward Śmigły-Rydz signed Plan West for defense against a future invasion by Nazi Germany. All units marked with black in mobilization plan were designed to create the Main Reserve of the Commander in Chief (Odwod Glowny Naczelnego Wodza). On March 22, 1939, General Wacław Stachiewicz, who at that time was the Chief of General Staff of the Polish Army (see Polish General Staff) ordered mobilization of all units marked with red and yellow, plus some of these marked with green and black. The mobilization began at 4 p.m., on March 23.

In early July 1939, regiments of the 26th Division were transported from Kutno to Wągrowiec and Żnin, with the headquarters established at the elementary school in Wapno near Kcynia. At the same time, the 9th Division was transported to the area of Koronowo, and placed under authority of General Władysław Bortnowski, commander of Pomorze Army. Both divisions were planned to take part in the possible Polish intervention in the Free City of Danzig. Furthermore, in spring 1939 at the Bydgoszcz-Biedaszkowo Airport, a special Polish Air Force squadron was created. According to Polish historian Jerzy Pawlak, the Biedaszkowo Squadron was to join the Intervention Corps. On May 15, 1939, the squadron was transferred from Bydgoszcz to Toruń, and on August 24, it was subjected to air command of Armia Pomorze.

In the summer of 1939, some changes were made. The 26th Infantry Division was transferred to Poznań Army, and placed under authority of General Tadeusz Kutrzeba. The 28th Infantry Division was transferred to Łódź Army, commanded by General Juliusz Rómmel, while the 10th Motorized Brigade was moved southwards, to General Antoni Szylling of Kraków Army.

On August 13, 1939, Polish Army Headquarters officially formed the Intervention Corps, whose task was to protect Polish interests in the Free City of Danzig, including any attempts of seizing the city by the Third Reich. In case of a military conflict, Polish military authorities planned to enter the territory of the Free City. Since 26th and 28th Divisions, together with 10th Motorized Brigade, had been moved to other areas, two divisions from Second Military District were mobilized on August 14–16. These were: 13th Infantry Division from Rowne in Volhynia, and 27th Infantry Division, from Kowel, also in Volhynia. Both were on August 17 and 18 transported by rail to Pomerelia, and positioned in the area of Bydgoszcz – Solec Kujawski – Inowrocław. They remained in combat readiness, with heavy equipment left on trains, ready to be transported northwards at any time. On August 24–27, the 27th I.D. was moved further northwards, to the area southwest of Starogard Gdański.

On August 28, headquarters of the Corps was established at Inowrocław. Its commandant remained under direct authority of the General Inspector of the Armed Forces until the beginning of the war, when control of the Corps was to be passed to General Bortnowski. All activities of the Corps were to be protected by 9th Infantry Division from Siedlce, and Tuchola Detachment (see Czersk Operational Group), both of which were stationed to the southwest. According to Polish planners, the Corps was tasked with capturing Danzig after a quick assault from the area of Skarszewy – Starogard Gdański. On August 30, 1939, due to changes in the political situation, the Corps was disbanded, as Polish intervention in Danzig was cancelled.

On August 31, 1939, at 8:50 a.m., Colonel Ignacy Izdebski of Toruń Army Inspectorate, who was chief of staff of Pomorze Army, received a message from Polish General Staff. General Skwarczynski was ordered to come to Warsaw immediately, 13th I.D. was to be placed under authority of the Armed Forces headquarters, while 27th I.D. was transferred to Pomorze Army. Following this message, 13th I.D. was ordered to move from Bydgoszcz to the area of Koluszki, where Prusy Army was concentrated. The transfer began on September 1 at midday, and due to the activity of the Luftwaffe and widespread destruction of rail links, it was not fully completed until the night of September 5/6. Meanwhile, 27th I.D. was ordered to abandon its positions south of Danzig, and walk across the Tuchola Forest to the area of Toruń. The division began its march on the first day of the war, and this delay resulted in its eventual destruction.

== The Intervention Corps (August 1939) ==
=== Headquarters ===
- Commandant of the Corps – General Stanisław Skwarczyński,
- Commandant of Artillery – Colonel Ludwik Zabkowski,
- Staff Officer – Major Marian Jan Sochanski,
- Commandant of Anti-Aircraft Defence – Major Aleksander Roman Boronski,
- Commandant of Engineers – Colonel Wincenty Krzywiec.

=== Command ===
- Chief of Staff – Colonel Bogdan Alfons Szeligowski,
- Chief of Detachment I – Colonel Zygmunt Andrzejowski,
- Chief of Detachment II – Major Adam Witold Chorzewski,
- Chief of Detachment III – Major Jan Alojzy Rudnicki,
- Operational Officer – Captain Marian Bronislaw Tonn
- Communications – Major Tadeusz Jozef Jan Jakubowski.

=== 13th Kresy Infantry Division ===
- Commandant of the Division – Colonel Jozef Cwiertniak. On August 30, 1939, Cwiertniak was released from his post due to poor health. He was immediately replaced by Colonel Wladyslaw Kalinski,
- Commandant of Divisional Infantry – Colonel Waclaw Szalewicz,
- Commandant of Divisional Artillery – Colonel Klaudiusz Reder,
- Chief of Staff – Colonel Kazimierz Siudowski.

=== 27th Infantry Division ===
- Commandant of the Division – General Juliusz Drapella,
- Commandant of Divisional Infantry – Colonel Karol Kaminski-Gwido,
- Commandant of Divisional Artillery – Colonel Andrzej Uthke,
- Chief of Staff – Colonel Stanislaw Bobrowski.

== Sources ==
- Piotr Zarzycki, Plan mobilizacyjny "W". Wykaz oddziałów mobilizowanych na wypadek wojny, Pruszków 1995
- Jan Wróblewski, Armia "Łódź" 1939, Wydawnictwo MON, Warszawa 1975
- Konrad Ciechanowski, Armia "Pomorze", Wydawnictwo MON, Warszawa 1983

== See also ==
- Border Protection Corps
- Operational Group
- Polish army order of battle in 1939
