= 18th Infantry Regiment (Poland) =

18th Infantry Regiment (Polish language: 18 Pulk Piechoty, 18 pp) was an infantry regiment of the Polish Army. It existed from late 1918 until September 1939. Garrisoned in Skierniewice, the unit belonged to the 26th Infantry Division from Skierniewice.

During the Polish-Soviet War, the regiment was stationed in Łomża. In the summer of 1921, it was transferred to Konin, and then to Skierniewice, remaining there until 1939. Its first commandant was Colonel Marian Herbert, the last one was Colonel Wiktor Adam Majewski.

Regimental flag, funded by the residents of the counties of Koło, Konin and Slupca, was handed by Jozef Pilsudski, on July 10, 1921. The badge was approved in 1926.

== Sources ==
- Kazimierz Satora: Opowieści wrześniowych sztandarów. Warszawa: Instytut Wydawniczy Pax, 1990
- Zdzisław Jagiełło: Piechota Wojska Polskiego 1918–1939. Warszawa: Bellona, 2007

== See also ==
- 1939 Infantry Regiment (Poland)
