= 5th Infantry Division (Poland) =

5th Lwów Infantry Division (Polish: 5 Lwowska Dywizja Piechoty) was a unit of the Polish Army in the interbellum period, with headquarters stationed in Lwów. It was created on May 20, 1919, during the Polish–Ukrainian War in Eastern Galicia. Originally, it consisted of three infantry regiments, but later it was strengthened with additional two. During Polish September Campaign it was commanded by General Juliusz Zulauf. The Division consisted in September 1939 of these regiments:

- 19th Relief of Lwow Infantry Regiment, stationed in Lwów and Brzeżany
- 26th Infantry Regiment, stationed in Grodek Jagiellonski
- 38th Lwów Rifles Infantry Regiment, stationed in Przemyśl
- 39th Lwów Rifles Infantry Regiment, stationed in Jarosław
- 40th Children of Lwów Infantry Regiment, stationed in Lwów.

== 1919–1921 ==
On April 4, 1919, Marshal Józef Piłsudski named General Wladyslaw Jedrzejewski commandant of the newly created Lwów Infantry Division. The division, formed in spring 1919 in former Austrian Galicia, consisted at first of three regiments: 38th, 39th (the so-called Lwów Brigade), and two battalions of the 40th Infantry Regiment. Furthermore, it had both light and heavy artillery.

By late April 1919, the Lwów Division (Dywizja Lwowska) consisted of 7000 soldiers, 54 cannons and 136 machine guns. On May 27, the division was reinforced with the 19th Infantry Regiment, and renamed into 5th Infantry Division. Its four infantry regiments were divided into 9th and 10th Infantry Brigades. At that time, the division consisted of:

- 38th Lwów Rifles Infantry Regiment,
- 39th Lwów Rifles Infantry Regiment,
- 40th Children of Lwów Infantry Regiments,
- 19th Relief of Lwów Infantry Regiment.

=== Polish–Ukrainian War ===
On May 14, 1919, Polish offensive in Eastern Galicia was initiated (see Polish–Ukrainian War). The Lwów Division initially advanced towards Zolkiew, and in late May, as part of Operational Group of General Wladyslaw Jedrzejewski, it captured Zborów (May 30). On June 1, together with the division of Colonel Władysław Sikorski it captured Tarnopol, main city of the region. By June 4, soldiers of the Lwów Division for the first time faced patrols of Red Army's 20th Rifle Division.

On June 8 Ukrainian counteroffensive started. Initially, it was a success, and Polish forces had to retreat westwards. Under Ukrainian pressure, the 5th Division suffered heavy losses. By June 23, it found itself near Bełżec, with only 3200 soldiers. When enemy advance was finally halted, Polish Army, reinforced with troops of General Józef Haller (see Blue Army (Poland)), managed to push back the Ukrainians. On June 28, Zloczow was recaptured, and the Lwów Division was reorganized.

General Polish offensive began on July 2, and lasted until July 17. Ukrainian forces were pushed behind the Zbruch River. 5th Infantry was positioned along the former Austro-Russian border, north of Zbaraz. Until late 1919, the division remained in the reserve of the Polish Galician Front. Its soldiers trained and rested, some were sent home. By late 1919, the division had only 3000 soldiers.

== Polish–Soviet War ==
In early 1920, the Red Army concentrated its forces in Podolia, east of the Zbruch river. The 5th Division was quickly reinforced, and in mid-February ordered to replace 12th Infantry. Moved some 50 kilometers east, it guarded the frontline in the area of Letychiv (Latyczow), along the swampy Southern Bug.

On February 18, the Lwów Division, together with elements of the 12th (Kresy) Division and two armoured trains attacked Bolshevik 44th Rifle Division. Polish forces were divided into three columns, and the assault took the enemy by complete surprise. The Poles, after losing only 130 soldiers, achieved their objective, moving the frontline further east. The Soviets counterattacked on February 23. Heavy fighting lasted for two days, but Polish positions were kept, and the 5th Division remained there until late April.

During the Kiev offensive, the Lwów Division together with 12th and 18th Infantry, belonged to Sixth Army of General Waclaw Iwaszkiewicz.

On June 5, 1920, Polish armies began a retreat from Ukraine. The Lwów Division defended the lines along the Sluch and Horyn rivers, as part of 10th Infantry Brigade. On July 5, together with 18th Infantry Division, the unit fought in the area of Dubno, and then near Krzemieniec. As part of the Sixth Army, it fought in the victorious Battle of Brody (29 July – 2 August), and then covered the city of Lwów, fighting near Lopatyn.

Following the successful Battle of Warsaw (1920), Polish forces initiated an offensive, also in former Galicia. The Lwów Division captured Busk in early September, pushing the enemy east. In early October the division supported Ukrainian forces allied to Poland, capturing Starokostiantyniv.

On October 18, 1920, the division withdrew to the line of the Zbruch river, which marked the newly established Polish–Soviet border (see Peace of Riga). Its subunits were at first located in the area of Zbaraz. In December 1920 and January 1921, 40th Infantry Regiment was transferred to Lwów, 38th Regiment to Przemyśl, and 39th Regiment to Jarosław. In February 1921, 19th Regiment was also moved to Lwów.

== Second Polish Republic ==
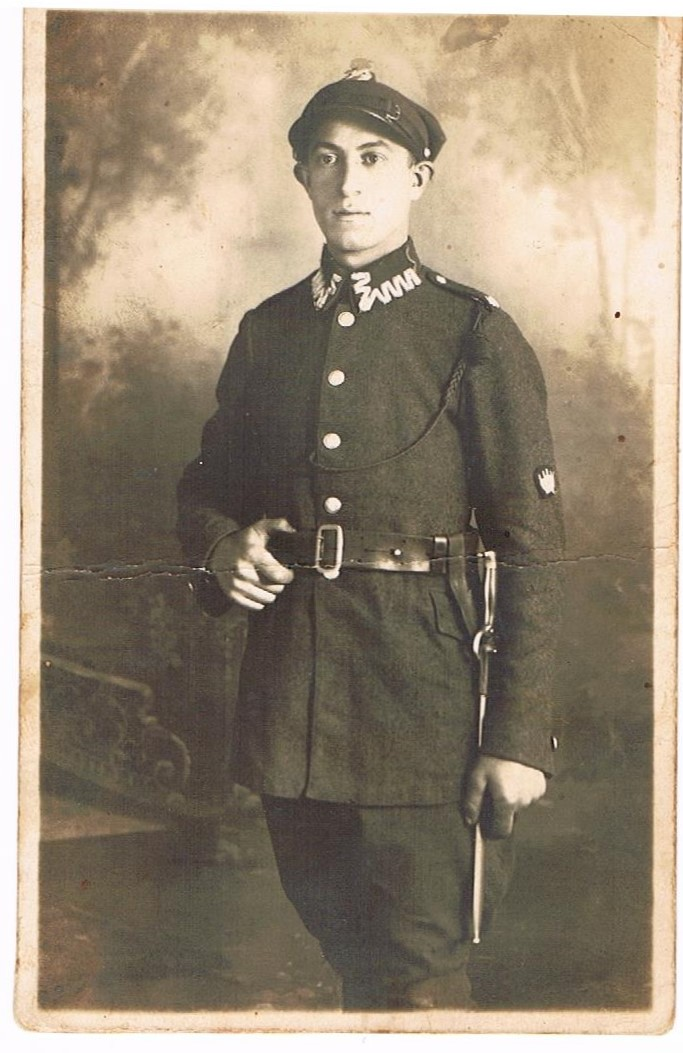
A picture of a Jewish soldier of the 40th Children of Lwów Infantry Regiments, 07/07/1929

In the Second Polish Republic, the 5th Infantry Division was stationed in the city of Lwów. By spring 1921, the division was reorganized: 38th and 39th Regiments were transferred to the 24th Infantry Division (based in Przemyśl), while 28th Infantry Regiment, formerly of the 7th Infantry Division, was attached to the Lwów Division. As a result, the division had three regiments: 19th, 28th and 40th.

== Polish September Campaign ==
According to Plan West, the Lwów Division was attached to Kutno Operational Group, which was a reserve of Polish General Staff. Its mobilization began on August 27, 1939, and on September 3, 1939, the 19th Infantry Regiment was transferred by rail to Włocławek, where it was attached to the Detachment of Colonel Sadowski, part of Pomorze Army. This part of Poland was regarded as crucial in Polish defensive plans, because of the Wehrmacht's advance towards Warsaw from Eastern Prussia. The 28th and 40th Regiments completed their mobilization on September 5, to be transported by rail to Biała Podlaska, via Dubno, Kowel and Brzesc nad Bugiem. The Division was then ordered to hold such locations as Zegrze, the suburbs of Modlin and the line of the Narew river.

On September 6, Commander in Chief Edward Rydz-Śmigły decided to send 40th Infantry Regiment to Warsaw, to reinforce the garrison of Polish capital. The 26th Regiment was divided into three groups: 1st Battalion was sent to Zgierz, 2nd Battalion to protect a bridge near Swider, and 3rd Battalion was sent to defend Warsaw. Due to the activity of the Luftwaffe, which bombed Polish rail lines, only elements of the division managed to reach their destinations. Main forces of the unit were concentrated north of Warsaw. Commanded by General Juliusz Zulauf, the division tried to halt German advance near Modlin, but failed to do so. After bloody fighting, the Wehrmacht managed to cross the Narew, and remnants of the division retreated to Warsaw and Modlin.

Regimens of the Lwów Division distinguished themselves in the Siege of Warsaw (1939), defending the districts of Wola, Praga and Bemowo. Divisional 19th Infantry Regiment, which was attached to Pomorze Army, fought in the Battle of the Bzura, where it was decimated by the Luftwaffe and ceased to exist on September 17.

During the Invasion of Poland, the 40th Regiment lost 30% of its soldiers, while 26th Regiment lost 25%. Ethnic Ukrainians, who consisted a large percentage of the conscripts, fought bravely, alongside their Polish companions.

== Operation Tempest ==
In the first half of 1944 the 5th I.D. was recreated as the 5th "Children of Lwów" Infantry Division of the Home Army. Commanded by Colonel Stefan Czerwinski, it took part in the Operation Tempest in the area of Lwów (see Lwów Uprising). Together with the 14th Uhlan Regiment of the Home Army, the Division (numbered at around 3000) engaged in street fighting in Lwów (July 23–26, 1944).

== 5th Infantry Division in Polish People's Army ==
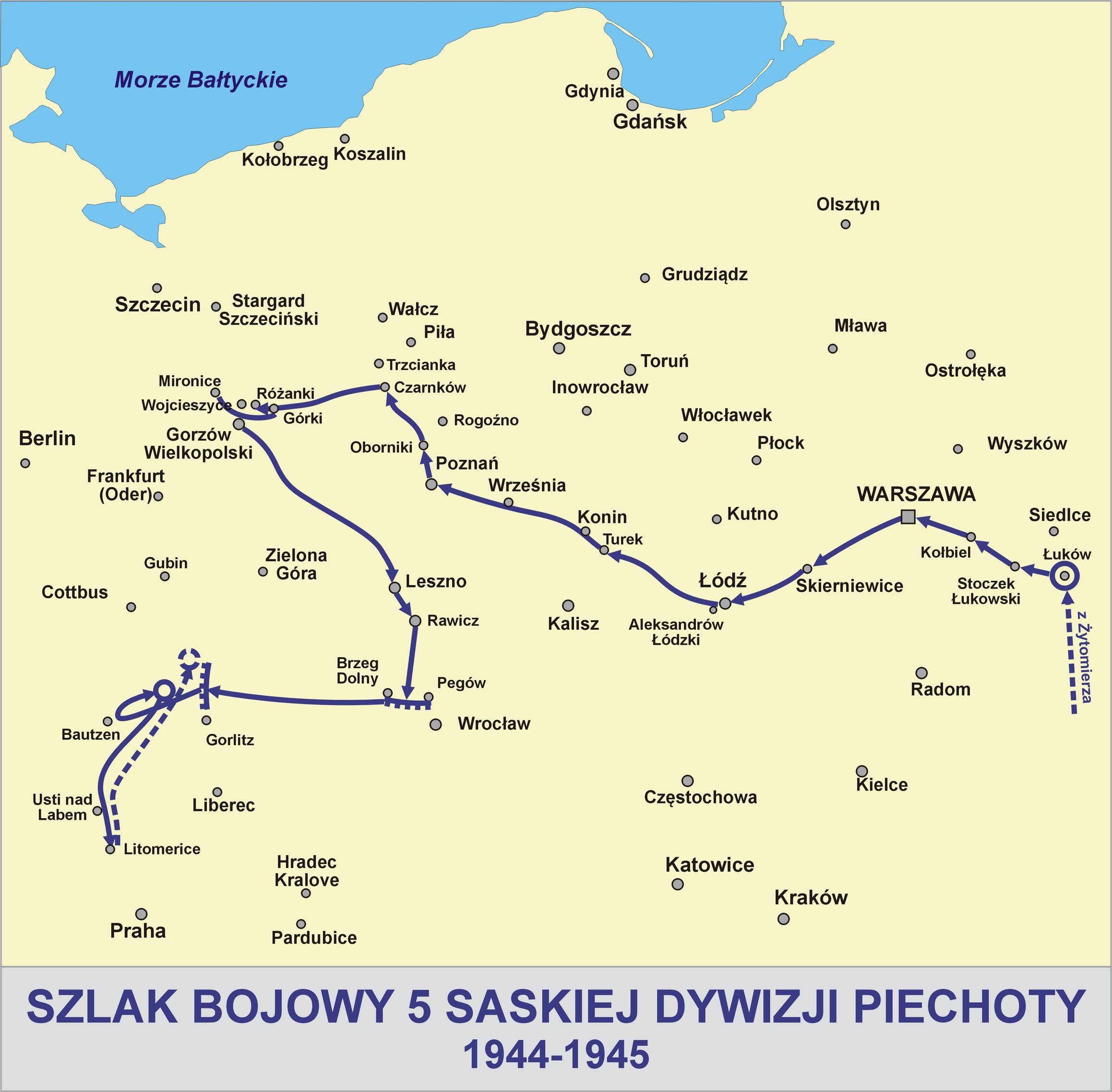
5th Division movements on the Eastern Front in 1944–1945

Formed on the Eastern Front as part of the Soviet-controlled Polish People's Army, the 5th Infantry Division trained for combat near Łuków in the second half of 1944. It was to be part of the Second Army formed on the liberated territories of Poland. In January 1945 it was ordered to move gradually towards the front and to continue training. It entered combat in the last month of the war, on April 16, 1945, as part of the southern wing of the Battle of Berlin, and subsequently fought in the Battle of Bautzen. In the final days of the war it took part in the Prague Offensive. Soon after the war, it received the honorific name "Saska" (Saxonian).

The division continued to serve in postwar Poland until it was disbanded in 1957. Its name "Saxonian" was given to the 5th Armoured Division which continued its traditions.

== Commandants of the 5th Infantry Division in the Second Polish Republic ==
- General Wladyslaw Jedrzejewski (since 4 IV 1919)
- Colonel Zygmunt Strzelecki (7 V 1919 – 7 VI 1919)
- Colonel Czesław Mączyński (1919)
- Colonel Dabrowski (1919)
- General Wladyslaw Jedrzejewski (1919–1920)
- Colonel Stanislaw Rosnowski (1920)
- General Paweł Szymański (1921–1921)
- General Jan Thullie (1921–1926)
- General Leon Zawistowski (1926–1928)
- General Walerian Czuma (1928–1938)
- General Juliusz Zulauf (1938–1939)

== Battle Order in September 1939 ==
- Headquarters and Staff. Commandant General Juliusz Zulauf, Artillery Commandant Colonel Jan Cialowicz, Chief of Staff Colonel Michal Drzystek-Drzewinski.
- 19th Relief of Lwów Infantry Regiment, Colonel Stanislaw Sadowski,
- 26th Infantry Regiment, Colonel Franciszek Wegrzyn,
- 40th Children of Lwów Infantry Regiment, Colonel Jozef Kalandyk,
- 5th Lwów Light Artillery Regiment, Colonel Tadeusz Poplawski,
- 5th Squadron of Heavy Artillery, Captain Bronislaw Grzybowski,
- 5th Sapper Battalion, a battery of antiaircraft artillery, cavalry squadron, machine gun company, military police, 601st field hospital field court and others.

== See also ==
- Polish army order of battle in 1939
- Polish contribution to World War II
- List of Polish divisions in World War II
