= Srebrna Góra =

Srebrna Góra ("silver hill") may refer to the following places in Poland:

- Srebrna Góra (Tarnowskie Góry Ridge) (south Poland)
- Srebrna Góra, Lower Silesian Voivodeship (south-west Poland)
- Srebrna Góra, Greater Poland Voivodeship (west-central Poland)
