= 19th Infantry Regiment (Poland) =

19th Relief of Lwow Infantry Regiment
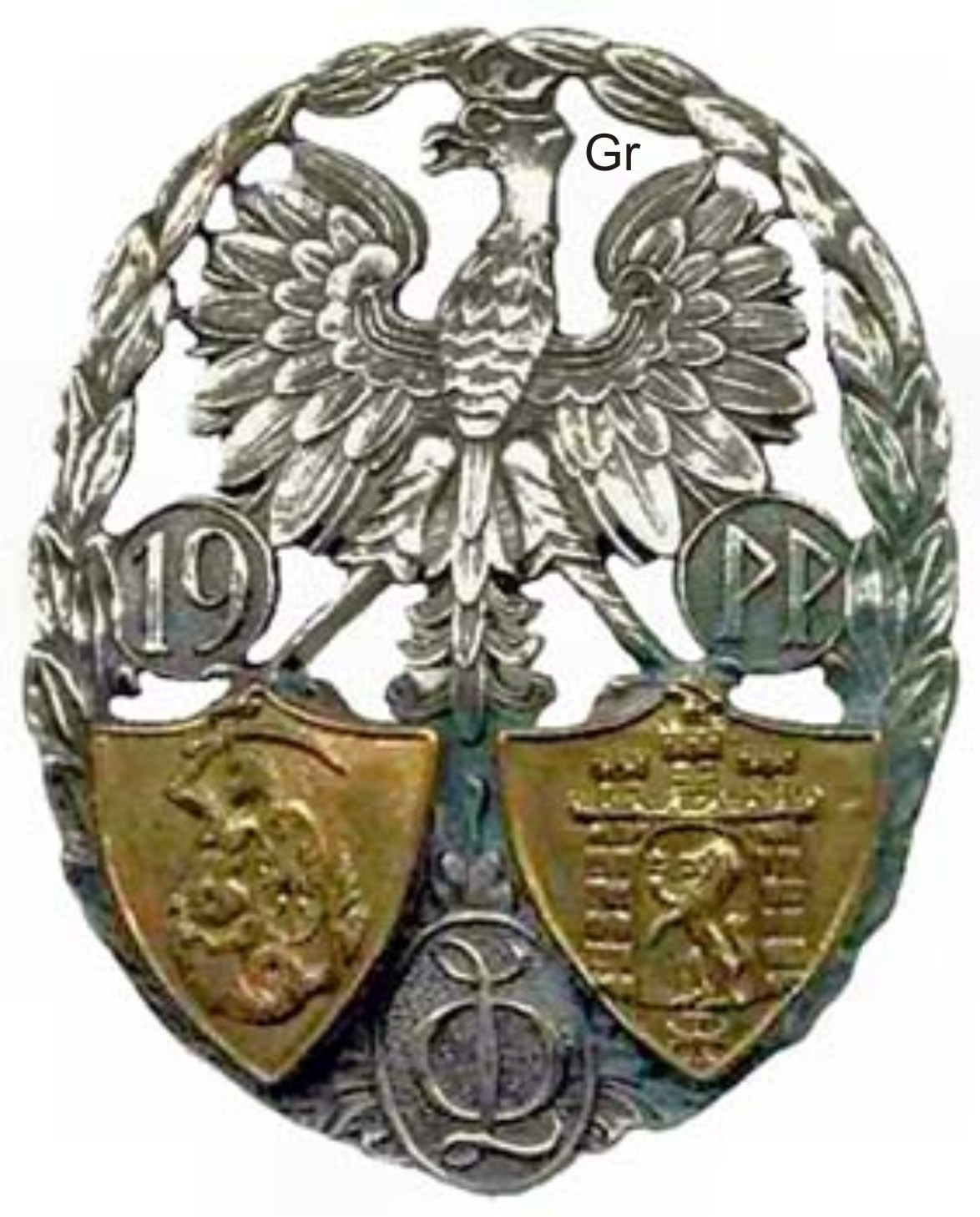
- Active: 12 April 1919 – September 1939
- Country: Poland
- Branch: 5th Lwów Infantry Division
- Role: Infantry
- Garrison/HQ: Lwów and Brzeżany
- Engagements: Polish-Ukrainian War; Polish-Soviet War: Kiev offensive; World War II: Invasion of Poland

19th Relief of Lwów Infantry Regiment (Polish: 19 Pulk Piechoty Odsieczy Lwowa, 19 pp) was an infantry regiment of the Polish Army. It existed from April 1919 until September 1939. Garrisoned in Lwów, the unit belonged to the 5th Lwów Infantry Division from Lwów. Its reserve battalion was stationed in Brzeżany. During the 1939 Invasion of Poland, the regiment, together with its division, belonged to Pomorze Army.

== Beginnings ==
In early November 1918, Lwów was captured by the armed forces of the West Ukrainian People's Republic. The city, with its predominantly Polish population, was defended by irregular units of Polish students, workers, clerks and others. Among them were children, who came to be known as Lwów Eaglets.

At the same time in Warsaw, the Committee of Defence of Lwów was formed by Antoni Osuchowski. Its members called for the relief of the city, and soon afterwards, with permission of Józef Piłsudski, the so-called Volunteer Unit of Relief of Lwów was formed by Colonel Stanislaw Skrzynski. Its First Battalion, without weapons, and commanded by Captain Antoni Olkowski, was in mid-December 1918 transported to Lublin and then to Przemyśl, where it was armed. On December 23, 1918, the battalion with its 27 officers and 303 soldiers entered Lwów, greeted enthusiastically by the Polish residents. The unit clashed several times with the enemy in January, February and March 1919, winning several battles, and managing to keep Grodek Jagiellonski, despite numerical superiority of the Ukrainians.

The Second Battalion of the Volunteer Unit of Relief of Lwów came to the city in March 1919. Commanded by Captain Ludwik Szyman, it merged with the First Battalion on April 12, 1919. After the Third Battalion was formed in Radom, the new unit was named the 19th Relief of Lwów Infantry Regiment.

The regiment was involved in heavy fighting in eastern part of former Austrian Galicia. Praised for the bravery of its soldiers, on June 1, 1919, it captured Tarnopol, together with 81 Ukrainian officers, 4000 soldiers and 69 machine guns. On June 7, it reached the Zbruch river. By that time, it had been reinforced by the Third Battalion. Regimental orchestra was sponsored by Helena Paderewska, the wife of Ignacy Jan Paderewski.

In late June 1919, Ukrainian forces began a major offensive, aimed at pushing back Polish units. The regiment, which was part of the 5th Infantry Division, managed to hold its positions, and capture Zloczow. By early July, another enemy appeared in Galicia: the Red Army, which marched westwards. After several clashes, in early autumn 1919 the regiment was sent to Wisniowiec, and then to Tarnopol (November 18), remaining in reserve until February 1920.

== Polish – Soviet War ==
On February 18, 1920, the regiment was sent to the area of Ploskirow. After several clashes with the Soviets it was ordered to hold the line of the Southern Bug river. The regiment carried out a number of successful raids: during one of them, it captured a Soviet armoured train.

In late April 1920, Polish forces began their offensive towards Kiev (see Kiev offensive (1920)). On May 3, the 19th Relief of Lwów Infantry Regiment captured Nemyriv, and a few days later it was transported to the area of Samhorodek (near Koziatyn). There, it clashed with the 1st Cavalry Army (Soviet Union) of Semyon Budyonny, losing 9 officers and 497 soldiers.

In late June 1920, during Polish retreat, the regiment clashed with the enemy near Zasław and then in the area of Krzemieniec, defending its positions for a prolonged time. In early August 1920 it fought near Brody. Since the city of Lwów was threatened by the Soviets, the regiment was ordered to capture Busk. In mid-September, after Polish counteroffensive had begun, the unit began its march eastwards, reaching Chmielnik on October 18, 1920.

On February 27, 1921, the regiment returned to Lwów.

== 1939 Invasion of Poland ==
In the 1939 German and Soviet Invasion of Poland, the 19th Relief of Lwów Infantry Regiment defended the town of Włocławek, and during the first week of the campaign, it did not engage the enemy. On September 6, General Władysław Bortnowski ordered the unit to protect western suburbs of Włocławek, to enable the 16th Lwów Infantry Division to cross the Vistula. On September 8, after all Polish soldiers had crossed the river, the regiment destroyed the bridge at Włocławek, and joined the 27th Lwów Infantry Division. Following the order of General Bortnowski, the regiment moved to Płock, to replace Nowogródzka Cavalry Brigade.

On September 12, the Wehrmacht began to cross the Vistula. In a heavy battle, which lasted until September 15, the regiment lost 300 KIA and 700 WIA. Since on September 16, Polish front collapsed in the Battle of the Bzura, the regiment was ordered to march to Iłów. On the next day, it was raided by the Luftwaffe. Polish losses were so heavy that the 19th Relief of Lwów Infantry Regiment ceased to exist. Isolated groups of soldiers managed to get to Warsaw.

== Commandants ==
- Captain Eugeniusz Zongollowicz (1919)
- Colonel Adolf Dabrowski (1919)
- Colonel Konstanty Oświęcimski (VI 1919)
- Captain Eugeniusz Zongollowicz (II 1920)
- Colonel Mieczyslaw Kawka (VI 1920)
- Colonel Juliusz Zulauf (28 IX 1921 -17 III 1927)
- Colonel Mikolaj Freund-Krasicki (III 1927 – VI 1930)
- Colonel Feliks Kwiatek (VI 1930-VI 1934)
- Colonel Kazimierz Dziurzynski (VI 1934-? 1939)
- Colonel Stanislaw Sadowski (III – IX 1939)

== Symbols ==
First flag of the 19th Relief of Lwów Infantry Regiment was funded by Warsaw Committee of Defence of Lwów, and was handed to its soldiers on April 23, 1919. Second flag, purchased by Civic Committee of Lwów and Eastern Lesser Poland, was handed to it by General Edward Śmigły-Rydz in Lwów, on June 1, 1928. During the war, the flag was kept in Sosnowiec. Currently it is kept at Polish Army Museum in Warsaw.

The badge, approved in 1928, featured the coats of arms of Lwów and Warsaw, with Polish Eagle and the inscription 19 PP.

== Sources ==
- Kazimierz Satora: Opowieści wrześniowych sztandarów. Warszawa: Instytut Wydawniczy Pax, 1990
- Zdzisław Jagiełło: Piechota Wojska Polskiego 1918–1939. Warszawa: Bellona, 2007

== See also ==
- 1939 Infantry Regiment (Poland)
