= Kutno Operational Group =

Kutno Operational Group was an Operational Group of the Polish Army. It was created in March 1939, a few months before the Invasion of Poland, and named after the town and major rail junction of Kutno, central Poland. Its official name was Kutno Reserve Group of Commander-in-Chief (Grupa Odwodow Naczelnego Wodza "Kutno", GO "Kutno"), and it remained under direct control of Commander-in-chief of the Polish Army, Marshal Edward Smigly-Rydz.

According to Plan West (March 1939), the Kutno Reserve Group, consisting of three infantry divisions, was to be concentrated in the area of Kutno (22nd Mountain Infantry Division), Włocławek (13th Infantry Division), and Płock (19th Infantry Division). As Colonel Jozef Jaklicz of Polish Army headquarters specified, the group was tasked with the following:

- defence of the Vistula river line, between Pomorze Army and Modlin Army,
- protection of flanks of Poznań Army or Pomorze Army.

In accordance with Mobilization Plan W, the 13th and 19th Divisions were marked with red (alarm mobilization), and 22nd Division was planned to join these units in first phase of general mobilization. In the summer 1939, Polish Army headquarters made some changes to Plan West. 13th and 19th Divisions were transferred to Prusy Army, and 22nd Division to Łódź Army. After these changes, Kutno Reserve Group of Commander-in-Chief consisted of 5th Infantry Division (from Army Pomorze) and 24th Infantry Division, from Łódź Army. As a result, the group was reduced from three to two infantry divisions

In the evening of August 27, 1939, some regiments of the 5th Infantry Division were mobilized. By Sunday, September 3, the regiments arrived at the Kutno rail station, and on the next day they reached Włocławek, where they were incorporated into Pomorze Army, as the so-called Detachment of Colonel Sadowski (Oddzial Wydzielony podpulkownika Sadowskiego). These regiments were the only units of the projected Kutno Operational Group, which reached the concentration area.

Due to worsening situation of the Polish Army, which was forced into a general retreat, on September 3 Polish Commander in Chief, Marshal Edward Smigly-Rydz abandoned the idea of creation of the Kutno Group. On that day, 24th Infantry Division was transferred to Karpaty Army, and on September 4, the 5th I.D. was transferred to Modlin Army.

== See also ==
- Intervention Corps
- Border Protection Corps
- Polish army order of battle in 1939
