= Srebrna Góra, Greater Poland Voivodeship =

Srebrna Góra
- Village
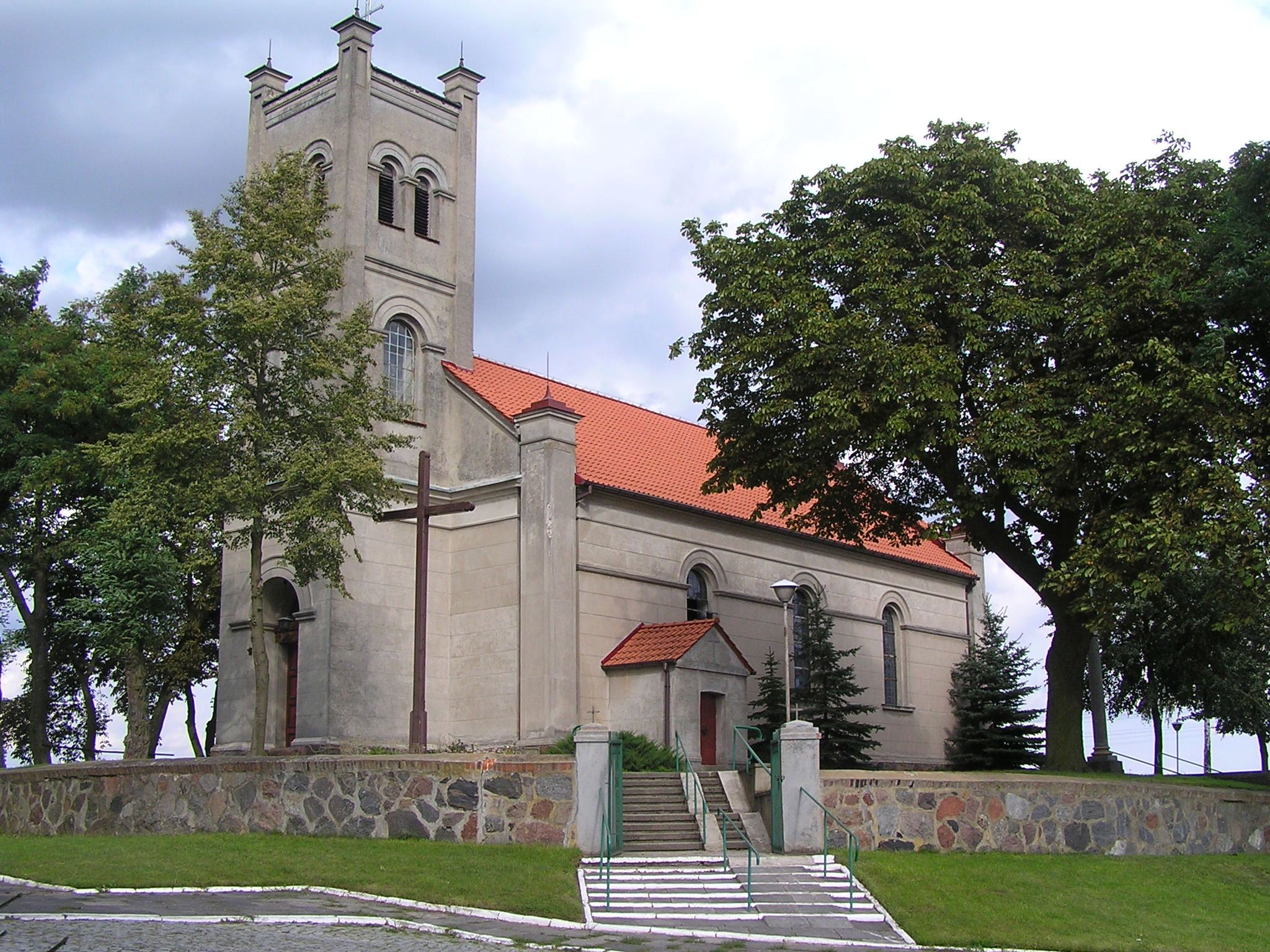
- Church of Saint Nicholas

- Location within Poland
- Coordinates: 52°53′27″N 17°30′1″E
- Country: Poland
- Voivodeship: Greater Poland
- Powiat: Wągrowiec
- Gmina: Wapno
- Established: 16th century

Population
  - Total: 330
- Time zone: UTC+1 (CET)
  - Summer (DST): UTC+2 (CEST)
- Postal code: 62-120
- Area code: +48 17
- Car Plates: PWA

Srebrna Góra [ˈsrɛbrna ˈɡura] is a village in the administrative district of Gmina Wapno, within Wągrowiec County, Greater Poland Voivodeship, in west-central Poland.

The Book of Benefices (Liber beneficiorum) of the Archbishops of Gniezno contains descriptions of the history of the areas of Wapno, Podolin, Rusiec and Srebrna Góra.

In the beginning of the 16th century, Srebrna Góra included a parish church under the appellation of Saint Nicholas; a parsonage; and while it still was a town, it was the most populated place in the area. In the end of 18th century Srebrna Góra belonged to Józef Radzimiński – a land judge of Gniezno. Since the 19th century, it has been owned by the Wilkoński family, and then by the Moszczeński family. Srebrna Góra was previously ascribed to the county of Kcyń. After the Second Partition of Poland in 1793, it was moved to the county Wągrowiec.

In the times of the Duchy of Warsaw (1807-1812), Srebrna Góra belonged to the capital city of Poznań. After 1815, the county of Wągrowiec (Powiat Wągrowiec) was re-established, but some parts of land were moved out of it for the sake of other Polish counties (powiats). New administrational changes were applied in 1887, when the county of Żnin was created, and Rusiec and Srebrna Góra were associated with it.

Srebrna Góra sent only one soldier for the Thirteen Years' War.

== Manor ==
There is a manor house and grounds in Srebrna Góra dating to the end of the 17th century, most likely built shortly after 1792. The manor, together with two ground-floor annexes of four-column porticos, is situated on a hill in front of the parish church. The buildings of the complex surround a large yard preceded by a gate. The date written on the gate – 1799 – may refer to the annexes, not the house itself. The oriented building is a nine-axial, ground-floor building with a classical order portico. The two pairs of protruded columns are of considerably slim proportions, and have simplified Ionic capitals. The high, hip-and-valley roof is covered with tiles. The whole complex is surrounded by a wall finished with a balustrade assembly.

Inside, a large hall leads to the main parlour, where a row connects the parlour and rooms situated to the right and left. Located behind the palace, there are five ponds situated on a park landscape. Today, the palace is used as a home for the elderly.

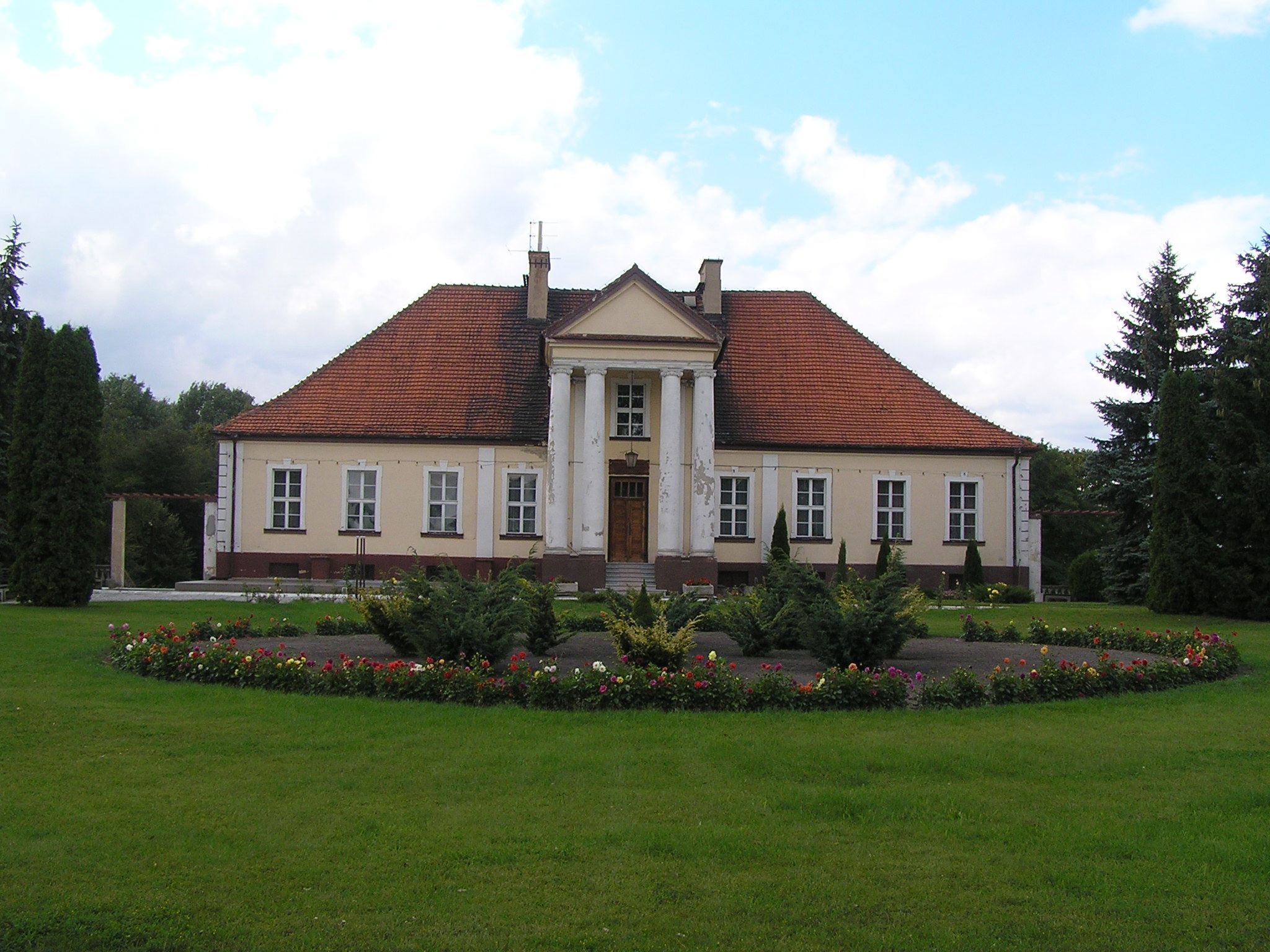
Manor house in Srebrna Góra

== St. Nicholas Church ==
Near the palace complex, there is a parish church under the appellation of Saint Nicholas that was built in 1848–1849. The original church was burnt in a fire, but was rebuilt with the preservation of late classical and eclectic features. The meetings of the "Catholic Society of Polish Workers" may have been held in the parish parlour of the church. The Society was active in Srebrna Góra during World War I and the interwar period.

== Notable residents ==
- Irena Jarocka (1946-2012)
