= 10th Infantry Regiment (Poland) =

- 10 Pułk Piechoty
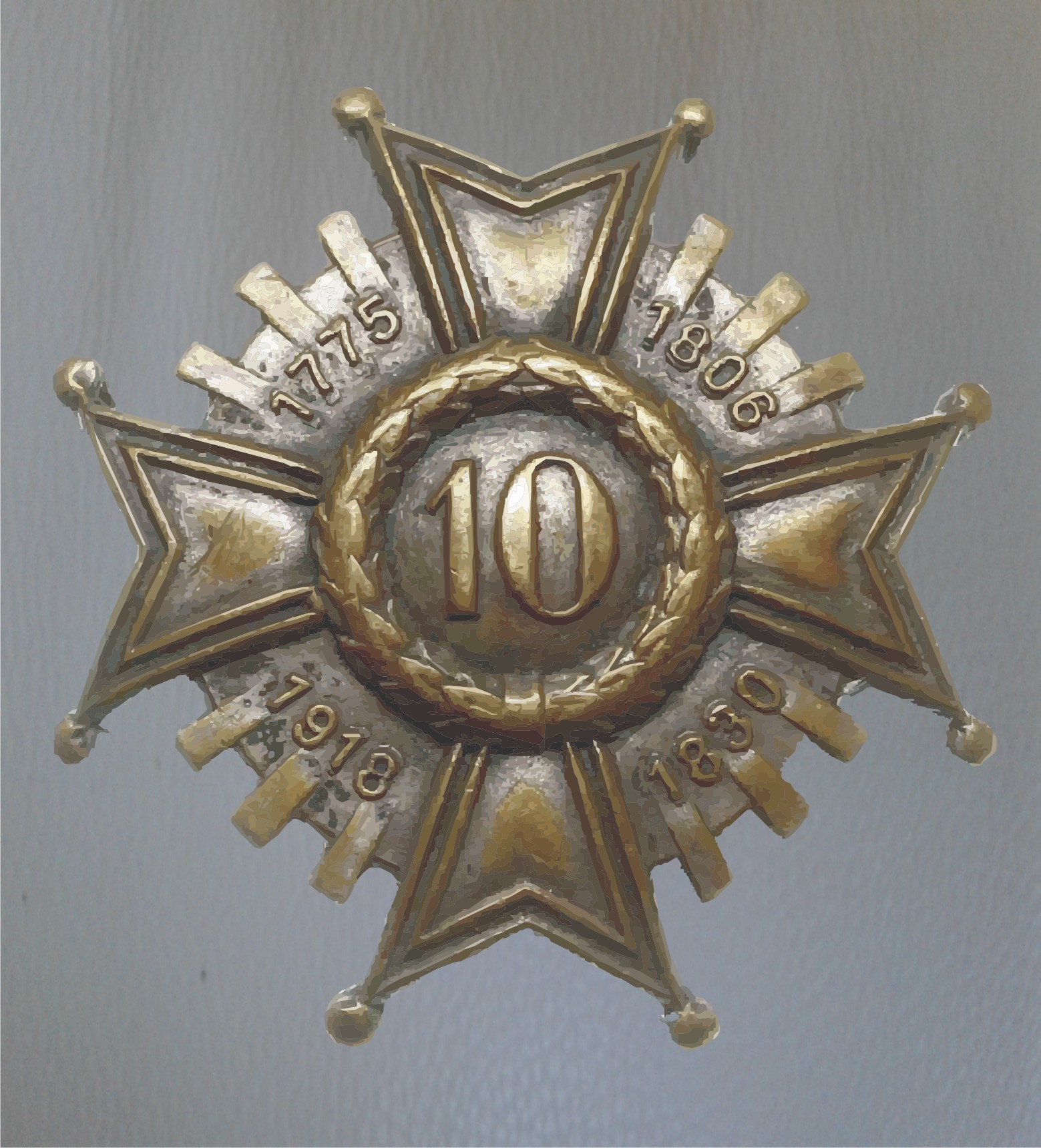
- Active: Late October 1918 – 19 September 1939
- Country: Poland
- Type: Infantry
- Size: Regiment
- Part of: 26th Infantry Division
- Garrison/HQ: Łowicz
- Engagements: Polish-Soviet War; World War II: Invasion of Poland; Battle of Bzura

10th Infantry Regiment (Polish language: 10 Pułk Piechoty, 10 pp) was an infantry regiment of the Polish Army. It existed from 1918 until 1939. Garrisoned in Łowicz, the unit belonged to the 26th Infantry Division from Skierniewice.

The history of the regiment dates back to late October 1918, when ethnic Poles, serving in the 31st Rifles Regiment of the Austro-Hungarian Army, took control over the city of Cieszyn. On November 5, 1918, the regiment pledged allegiance to the Regency Council (Poland), and on December 6, it was renamed into the Infantry Regiment of the Land of Cieszyn. On February 8, 1919, the name was changed again, into the 10th Infantry Regiment.

After the Polish-Soviet War, the regiment was moved to central Polish town of Łowicz, to Jozef Pilsudski Barracks, located on Podrzeczna Street.

The flag of the regiment, funded by Lowicz Association of Landowners, was handed to it on January 23, 1921, in Zambrow. In July 1925, a new flag was funded, and handed to the regiment during a ceremony attended by President Stanislaw Wojciechowski.

The badge, approved in 1928, was in the shape of the cross, with the number 10 in the middle, and historic dates 1775 1806 1830 1918.

As part of the 19th Infantry Division, it fought in the Invasion of Poland, and was destroyed in the Battle of Bzura.

== Commandants ==
- Colonel Ludwik Skrzypek 6 XI – 6 XII 1918,
- Colonel Edward Reymann 7 XII 1918 – 26 I 1919,
- Colonel Teodor Obraczay 27 I – 23 VI 1919,
- Colonel Waclaw Banaszkiewicz 24 VI – 21 VII 1919,
- Colonel Adolf Jastrzebski 22 VII – 4 XII 1919,
- Major Kazimierz Topolinski 5 XII 1919 – 15 I 1925,
- Colonel Stanislaw Wecki 1925-1926,
- Colonel Leon Gotkiewicz 1926-1928,
- Colonel Stefan Kossecki 1928-1930,
- Colonel Marian Krudowski 1930-1939.

== Sources ==
- Kazimierz Satora: Opowieści wrześniowych sztandarów. Warszawa: Instytut Wydawniczy Pax, 1990
- Zdzisław Jagiełło: Piechota Wojska Polskiego 1918-1939. Warszawa: Bellona, 2007

== See also ==
- 1939 Infantry Regiment (Poland)
