= Gmina Wapno =

Gmina Wapno Wapno Commune
- Gmina
- Coat of arms
- Interactive map of Gmina Wapno
- Coordinates (Wapno): 52°54′37″N 17°28′23″E
- Country: Poland
- Voivodeship: Greater Poland
- County: Wągrowiec
- Seat: Wapno

Area
  - Total: 44.19 km^{2} (17.06 sq mi)

Population (2006)
  - Total: 3,068
  - Density: 69.43/km^{2} (179.8/sq mi)
- Website: http://www.wapno.pl

Gmina Wapno is a rural gmina (administrative district) in Wągrowiec County, Greater Poland Voivodeship, in west-central Poland. Its seat is the village of Wapno, which lies approximately 23 kilometres (14 mi) north-east of Wągrowiec and 68 km (42 mi) north-east of the regional capital Poznań.

The gmina covers an area of 44.19 square kilometres (17.1 sq mi), and as of 2006 its total population is 3,068.

== Villages ==
Gmina Wapno contains the villages and settlements of Aleksandrowo, Graboszewo, Komasin, Podolin, Rusiec, Srebrna Góra, Stołężyn and Wapno.

== Neighbouring gminas ==
Gmina Wapno is bordered by the gminas of Damasławek, Gołańcz, Kcynia and Żnin.
