= Irena Jarocka =

Polish singer (1946–2012)

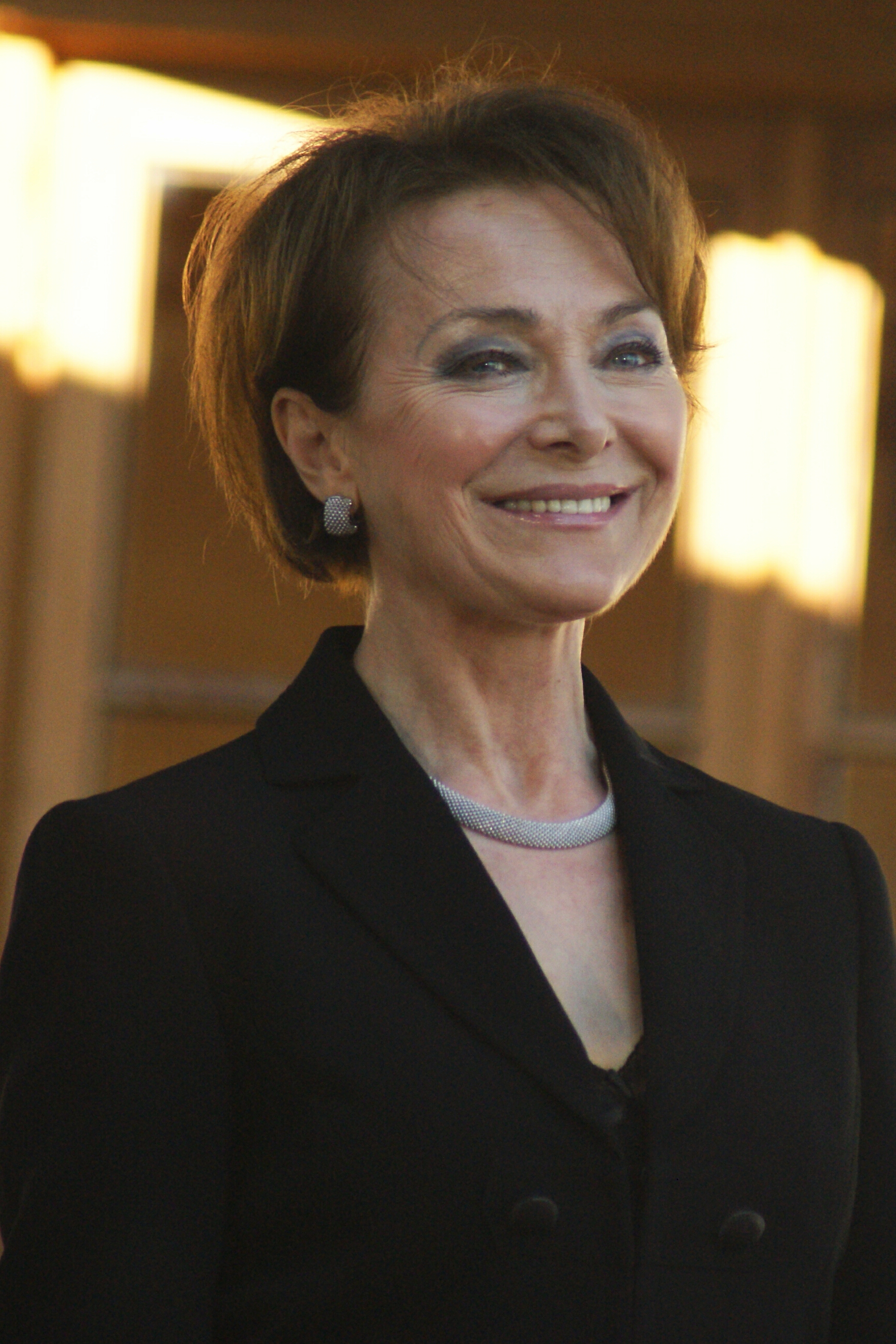
- Irena Jarocka, Poznan, 2010

Background information
- Born: 18 August 1946; Srebrna Góra, Poland
- Origin: Poland
- Died: 21 January 2012 (aged 65) Warsaw, Poland
- Genres: Pop
- Occupation: Singer
- Years active: 1966–2012
- Label: Universal Music Poland
- Website: irenajarocka.pl

Irena Wanda Jarocka (18 August 1946 – 21 January 2012), was a Polish singer.

== Early life and education ==
Jarocka was born on 18 August 1946 in Srebrna Góra, Poland. She graduated from the V Liceum Ogólnokształcące im. Stefana Żeromskiego, and the faculty of music studies at Średnia Szkoła Muzyczna in Gdańsk, studying under professor Halina Mickiewiczówna. She later graduated from a Faculty of Biology at a teachers' college. Between 1969 and 1973 she lived in Paris on a scholarship, studying at Le Petit Conservatoire de la Chanson.

== Career ==
=== Music ===
Jarocka participated in amateur singing competitions, and worked with Zespół Estradowy Marynarki Wojennej Flotylla. In 1966, at 20 years old, she debuted at Klub Rudy Kot in Gdańsk, and first participated in the Krajowy Festiwal Piosenki Polskiej in Opole. She also performed at the Sopot Festival. She recorded albums for the Philips label and performed in concerts with Michel Sardou, Enrico Macias, Charles Aznavour, and Mireille Mathieu. She sang outside Poland, in such countries as Germany, Bulgaria, Switzerland, Italy, Portugal, Luxembourg, Australia and France, and for Polish communities in the US and Canada. She worked with Polanie, Czerwone Gitary, Budka Suflera, and Exodus.)

=== Film and television ===
Jarocka acted with Andrzej Kopiczyński in the film adaptation of Motylem jestem, czyli romans 40-latka (I am a butterfly, or a 40-year-old's romance), scripted and directed by Jerzy Gruza and Krzysztof Teodor Toeplitz. In the film Jarocka sang her own songs, including "Motylem jestem" ("I am a butterfly") and "Po prostu człowiek" ("Simply a human").

Her performances and programs were recorded for Telewizja Polska stations in Gdańsk, Łódź, Poznań, Wrocław, Katowice, and Warsaw, including Irena Jarocka zaprasza (Irena Jarocka Invites You), Irena Jarocka i jej goście (Irena Jarocka and Guests), Spotkanie z gwiazdą (A Meeting with a Star), Mężczyzna na niepogodę (Man for Bad Weather), Największe przeboje Ireny Jarockiej (Biggest Hits of Irena Jarocka), Zwariowany dzień (A Crazy Day), and Bo wszystko jest piosenką francuską (Because Everything is a French Song). She also took part in Muzyka łączy pokolenia (Music Connects Generations) on TVP3.

In 2006, in the US, she took part in the Amerykańskie Rozmowy w toku (American Conversations) with Ewa Drzyzga. The show dealt with famous Poles trying to make a living abroad.

== Personal life and death ==
From 1990 she lived in the United States with her second husband Michał Sobolewski , whom she married in 1989 while being in relationship from 1976 for 35 years till her last day. Her daughter with Sobolewski, Monika Sobolewska was born in Poland in 1982 and graduated from Texas Tech University in art-communication design. Jarocka was performing continuously in the States and European countries. Her first marriage, to Marian Zacharewicz, was dissolved.

She maintained continuous ties with her public in Poland while living periodically in Warsaw during her frequent concert tours there. In 2007, she published an autobiographical novel, Motylem jestem, czyli piosenka o mnie samej.

She died on 21 January 2012, aged 65, in Warsaw, from brain cancer.

== Awards ==
- 1968: First place – Telewizyjna Giełda Piosenki with song "Gondolierzy znad Wisły" (Gondoliers from Vistula)
- 1971: Silver Gronostaj Award – Festival in Rennes, for music interpretation
- 1973: Silver Ring award – FPŻ in Kołobrzeg, with song "Ballada o żołnierzu, któremu udało się powrócić" (Ballad of a soldier, who manager to return)
- 1974: Audience Award – International Song Festival in Sopot
- 1975: Silver Nail of 1974 – Number 1 popularity award by readers of the "Kurier Polski (dziennik popołudniowy)"
- 1975: Second place – Coupe d’Europe Musicale in Villach, Austria
- 1976: Silver Nail of 1975 – Number 1 popularity award by readers of the "Kurier Polski (dziennik popołudniowy)"
- 1976: Special mention – Festival in Tokyo, Japan, for song "Odpływają kawiarenki" (Cafes are floating away)
- 1977: Silver Nail of 1976 – Number 1 popularity award by readers of the "Kurier Polski (dziennik popołudniowy)"
- 1978: Special mention – Festival in Palma de Mallorca, for song "Wymyśliłam cię" (I made you up)
- 1978: Second place – Festival in Drezno, Germany, for song "Mój słodki Charlie" (My sweet Charlie)
- 1978: Special mention – Festival in Limassol, Cyprus
- 1979: Silver Nail of 1978 – Number 1 popularity award by readers of the "Kurier Polski (dziennik popołudniowy)"

== Discography ==
=== Albums ===
- 1974 – W cieniu dobrego drzewa, re-edition 2001
- 1976 – Gondolierzy znad Wisły, re-edition 2001
- 1977 – Wigilijne życzenie, re-edition 2001
- 1977 – Koncert
- 1978 – Być narzeczoną twą, re-edition 2001
- 1981 – Irena Jarocka
- 1987 – Irena Jarocka II
- 1992 – My French favorites
- 2001 – Mój wielki sen
- 2004 – Kolędy bez granic
- 2008 – Małe rzeczy
- 2010 – Ponieważ znów są Święta
- 2012 – Piosenki francuskie

=== Singles ===
- 1969 – Il faut y croire/Tu me reviendras
- 1970 – Tant que la barque va/Et ce sera moi
- 1974 – Śpiewam pod gołym niebem/Wymyśliłam Cię/Nie wrócą te lata/W cieniu dobrego drzewa
- 1975 – Junge Liebe/Warum weint der Wind
- 1975 – Kocha się raz/Zawsze pójdę z tobą
- 1976 – Sag ihm, das ich ihn liebe/Auf dem Bahnsteig Nr 8
- 1976 – Odpływają kawiarenki/Przeczucie
- 1976 – Sto lat czekam na twój list/By coś zostało z tych dni
- 1977 – Morgenrot/Unser Zelt aus Stroh
- 1978 – Garść piasku/Chyba się warto o mnie bić
- 1978 – Niech tańczą nasze serca/Mój słodki Charlie
- 1978 – Nie wiadomo, który dzień/Wszystko dam
- 1978 – Być narzeczoną twą/Przeoczone, zawinione
- 1978 – Nadzieja/Był ktoś
- 1979 – Piosenka spod welonu/Mon Harley Davidson/Plaisir d'amour/Aranjuez mon amour
- 1980 – To za mało/Nie odchodź jeszcze
- 1981 – Tańczy niedziela/Gimmie some lovin
- 1981 – Mam temat na życie/Bliski sercu dzień
- 2001 – Magia księżyca/Dance remix Motylem jestem, Kawiarenki, Nie wrócą te lata
- 2002 – Na krakowską nutę – duo with Wawele group
- 2008 – Małe rzeczy
- 2009 – No to co
- 2010 – Break Free – duo with Michael Bolton
- 2010 – Ponieważ znów są Święta

=== Compilation albums ===
- 1995 – Wielkie przeboje
- 1995 – Kolekcja vol.1
- 1995 – Kolekcja vol.2
- 1998 – Odpływają kawiarenki – Złota kolekcja
- 2002 – Złote przeboje – Platynowa kolekcja
- 2003 – Motylem jestem
- 2006 – Moje złote przeboje – Platynowa kolekcja
- 2006 – Piosenki o miłości – Platynowa kolekcja
- 2010 – Największe przeboje część 1
- 2010 – Największe przeboje część 2
- 2011 – 40 piosenek Ireny Jarockiej
