= Aleksandrowo, Wągrowiec County =

Aleksandrowo
- Village
- Location within Poland
- Coordinates: 52°53′N 17°28′E
- Country: Poland
- Voivodeship: Greater Poland
- County: Wągrowiec
- Gmina: Wapno
- Population: 100

Aleksandrowo [alɛksanˈdrɔvɔ] is a village in the administrative district of Gmina Wapno, within Wągrowiec County, Greater Poland Voivodeship, in west-central Poland.
