= Roman Umiastowski =

Polish Army colonel, patriot and bibliophile

Roman Umiastowski, who was born on January 29, 1893, in Warsaw and died on December 29, 1982, in London, has been a colonel in the Polish Army, a patriot and a bibliophile.

== Biography ==
=== World War II ===
When the Germans invaded Poland, Umiastowski was the head of the propaganda department in the Polish High Staff. On the night of 6/7 September 1939 he aired a message on the radio, urging all able men of Warsaw to go to the front; the idea was to man a defense line east of the Vistula. The result is said to have been one of the most legendary traffic jams in history. Umiastowki continued his work after arriving in England after the military collapse in 1939 and published ("with the assistance of Joanna Mary Aldridge"): Russia and the Polish Republic 1918 - 1941 (London, 1945?, pp 320 ) and Poland, Russia and Great Britain 1941 - 1945. A Study of Evidence(London, 1946, pp 544). The first in memory of his son, lieutenant Jan Kazimierz, who fell on May 11, 1944, as a member of The 5th Wilno Brigade at Monte Casino, Italy. Both books are documented by a wealth of source material. After the war Colonel Umiastowski pursued his hobby, bibliophily. He had a remarkable collection, among which an important copy of Copernicus's De revolutionibus, which he eventually donated to a Polish library.

In the 1970s, he published two science fiction novels, under the pen name of Boleslaw Zarnowiecki.
