= Stołężyn =

- Village
- Location within Poland
- Coordinates: 52°56′N 17°27′E
- Country: Poland
- Voivodeship: Greater Poland
- County: Wągrowiec
- Gmina: Wapno
- Population: 590

Stołężyn [stɔˈwɛ̃ʐɨn] is a village in the administrative district of Gmina Wapno, within Wągrowiec County, Greater Poland Voivodeship, in west-central Poland.
