= Juliusz Zulauf =

Polish Army brigadier general (1891–1943)

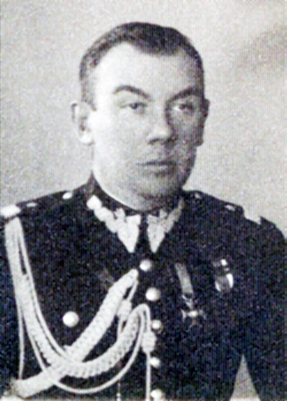
- Born: 20 August 1891; Lemberg, Galicia, Austrian Empire
- Died: 21 May 1943 (aged 51); Oflag VII-A Murnau, Murnau, Nazi Germany
- Military career
- Service years: 1913–1943
- Rank: Generał brygady
- Commands: CO of the 5th Infantry Division
- Conflicts: World War I, Polish-Ukrainian War, Polish-Soviet War, Invasion of Poland (1939)
- Awards: Cross of the Valorous 4 times Virtuti Militari Cross of Independence Krzyz Zaslugi

Juliusz Zulauf (20 August 1891 – 21 May 1943) was a Polish Army brigadier general (generał brygady). A recipient of the Virtuti Militari, he fought with distinction during World War I, the Polish-Ukrainian War, the Polish-Soviet War, and the 1939 invasion of Poland.

Juliusz Zulauf was born in Lemberg, then the capital of Austro-Hungarian Galicia. In 1910, after graduating from a local gymnasium, he joined the Lemberg Technical Academy. There, at the age of 18, he joined the Związek Walki Czynnej and the Związek Strzelecki. After the outbreak of The Great War, on 1 September 1914, he joined the Polish Legions. In 1915 he was promoted to first lieutenant and then to captain. He commanded a company of infantry in the 2nd Legions Infantry Regiment and then in 5th Infantry Regiment. Wounded in July 1916, during the battle of Opłowa he was taken prisoner of war by the Russians. However, Zulauf managed to escape from captivity and cross the front lines to rejoin the Polish Legions. After the Oath Crisis of 1917 he was drafted into the Austro-Hungarian Army.

After Poland was reestablished in 1918, Juliusz Zulauf returned to his hometown, where he joined the Polish Army and took part in the defence of Lwów during the Polish-Ukrainian War. On 11 May 1919, he was given the command of the Polish 4th Legions Infantry Regiment and took part in the opening stages of the Polish-Bolshevik War. Heavily wounded in August of that year, he quickly recovered. However, he did not reassume his former post and instead became the commanding officer of the garrison of Radom on 1 October of that year.

After the cease fire agreement, on 23 March 1921, he became a peacetime commander of the 28th Kaniów Rifles Infantry Regiment and, since 28 September of that year, commanding officer of the 19th Infantry Regiment. Promoted to colonel in 1923, between 1926 and 1927 Zulauf commanded the 3rd Infantry Regiment, only to be promoted to the commander of infantry of the 5th Infantry Division. He held that post until April 1930, when he was promoted to commanding officer of the prestigious Polish 2nd Legions Infantry Division stationed in Kielce. For his service on 1 January 1932, he was promoted to the rank of brigadier general. From 1937 on, he commanded the Lwów-based 5th Infantry Division and with that unit he was active during the Invasion of Poland. After heavy fighting, his division was reduced to only one regiment, but managed to break through to Warsaw and took part in the defence of the Polish capital as part of the Warszawa Army. From 14 September, Zulauf commanded the eastern perimeter of Warsaw's defences, in the city's easternmost district, Praga.

After Warsaw's capitulation (28 September), Zulauf was taken prisoner of war by the Germans. He died 21 May 1943, at Oflag VIIA in Murnau.

His daughter Irena has donated many of Zulauf's personal belongings to the Kielce municipal museum.

== Honours and awards ==
- Gold Cross of the Virtuti Militari
- Silver Cross of the Virtuti Militari
- Commander's Cross of the Order of Polonia Restituta
- Officers Cross of the Order of Polonia Restituta
- Cross of Independence
- Cross of Valour
- Cross of Valour
- Cross of Valour
- Cross of Valour
- Cross of Valour
- Gold Cross of Merit
