= Graboszewo, Wągrowiec County =

Graboszewo
- Village
- Location within Poland
- Coordinates: 52°55′14″N 17°29′55″E
- Country: Poland
- Voivodeship: Greater Poland
- County: Wągrowiec
- Gmina: Wapno

Graboszewo [ɡrabɔˈʂɛvɔ] is a village in the administrative district of Gmina Wapno, within Wągrowiec County, Greater Poland Voivodeship, in west-central Poland.
