= Operational Group (Poland) =

Tactical division of the Polish Army

Operational Group (Polish: Grupa Operacyjna, GO) was the highest level type of tactical division of the Polish Army at various points in the 20th century, mainly during the Second World War.

== Polish-Bolshevik War (1919-1921) ==
Operational groups first appeared in the Polish tactical scheme during the Polish-Bolshevik War, most probably under the influence of French Military Mission to Poland. After the war they were dissolved.

== Annexation of Trans-Olza (1938) ==
In the autumn of 1938, the Independent Operational Group Silesia was created with the purpose of capturing Trans-Olza from Czechoslovakia.

== World War II (1939-1945) ==
Prior to World War II, operational groups were recreated on a larger scale. Initially, in March 1939, Operational Groups consisted only of staffs formed around existing corps commands. Some groups were formed during the final mobilization of late August 1939, while others were formed during the war as strategic considerations necessitated. Most were attached to armies, several however were independent. According to the Polish mobilization scheme, they were to become mobile reserves of the Polish armies and other major strategic-scale units. One such group, the Kutno Operational Group, was planned but never created

Independent Operational Groups:

- Independent Operational Group "Polesie" (Samodzielna Grupa Operacyjna Polesie) under gen. Franciszek Kleeberg. Created around September 9th-11th.
- Independent Operational Group "Narew" (Samodzielna Grupa Operacyjna Narew) under gen. Czesław Młot-Fijałkowski. Created on March 23
- Operational Group "Wyszków" (Grupa Operacyjna Wyszków) under gen. Wincenty Kowalski. Created on September 1.
- Operational Group "Grodno" (Grupa Operacyjna Grodno) under gen. Józef Olszyna-Wilczyński. Created in early September; disbanded on September 10 before the battle of Grodno begun; most units moved towards Lwów.

Cavalry Operational Groups:

- Cavalry Operational Group Abraham (Grupa Operacyjna Kawalerii Abraham) under Roman Abraham
- Cavalry Operational Group Anders (Grupa Operacyjna Kawalerii Anders) under gen. Władysław Anders
- Cavalry Operational Group No.1 (Grupa Operacyjna Kawalerii Nr 1)
- Cavalry Operational Group No.2 (Grupa Operacyjna Kawalerii Nr 2)

Operational Groups formed as parts of armies:

- Operational Group "Bielsko"" (Grupa Operacyjna Bielsko) under gen. Mieczysław Boruta-Spiechowicz (on September 3 renamed to Operational Group "Boruta") (Grupa Operacyjna Boruta)
- Operational Group "Czersk" (Grupa Operacyjna Czersk) under gen. Stanisław Grzmot-Skotnicki
- Operational Group "Koło" (Grupa Operacyjna Koło) under gen. Edmund Knoll-Kownacki (on September 6 renamed to Operational Group "Knoll-Kownacki") (Grupa Operacyjna Knoll-Kownacki)
- Operational Group "Piotrków" (Grupa Operacyjna Piotrków) under gen. Wiktor Thommée (on September 6 renamed to Operational Group "Thommée") (Grupa Operacyjna Thommée)
- Southern Operational Group (Południowa Grupa Operacyjna) under gen. Stanisław Skwarczyński
- Northern Operational Group (Pólnocna Grupa Operacyjna) under gen. Jan Kruszewski
- Operational Group "Sieradz" (Grupa Operacyjna Sieradz) under gen. Franciszek Dindorf-Ankowicz
- Operational Group "Śląsk" (Samodzielna Grupa Operacyjna Śląsk) under gen. Jan Jagmin-Sadowski (on September 3 renamed to Operational Group "Jagmin" (Grupa Operacyjna Jagmin))
- Eastern Operational Group (Wschodnia Grupa Operacyjna) under gen. Mikołaj Bołtuć (on September 9 renamed to Operational Group "Bołtuć") (Grupa Operacyjna Bołtuć)

In addition, during the invasion of Poland in 1939, several other corps-sized units were formed or improvised. All of them were named after their commanding officers:

1. Operational Group Dreszer (Grupa Operacyjna Dreszer) under Rudolf Dreszer
2. Operational Group Orlik-Łukoski (Grupa Operacyjn Orlik-Łukoski) under Kazimierz Orlik-Łukoski
3. Operational Group Grzmot-Skotnicki (Grupa Operacyjna Grzmot-Skotnicki) under Stanisław Grzmot-Skotnicki
4. Operational Group Kareszewicz-Tokarzewski (Grupa Operacyjna Karaszewicz-Tokarzewski) under Michał Karaszewicz-Tokarzewski
5. Operational Group Zaulauf under (Grupa Operacyjna Zulauf) Juliusz Zulauf

== Post-World War II (1946-1947) ==
There were also several operational groups created by the Polish People's Army (Ludowe Wojsko Polskie) after the war in the years 1946-1947.

== See also ==
- Polish army order of battle in 1939
