= Rusiec, Greater Poland Voivodeship =

Rusiec
- Village
- Location within Poland
- Coordinates: 52°56′N 17°30′E
- Country: Poland
- Voivodeship: Greater Poland
- County: Wągrowiec
- Gmina: Wapno
- Population: 190

Rusiec [ˈruɕɛt͡s] is a village in the administrative district of Gmina Wapno, within Wągrowiec County, Greater Poland Voivodeship, in west-central Poland.
