= Podolin =

- Village
- Location within Poland
- Coordinates: 52°54′N 17°27′E
- Country: Poland
- Voivodeship: Greater Poland
- County: Wągrowiec
- Gmina: Wapno

Podolin [pɔˈdɔlin] is a village in the administrative district of Gmina Wapno, within Wągrowiec County, Greater Poland Voivodeship, in west-central Poland.

The village is first mentioned in an 1136 bull of Innocent II. Information about its history is also contained in the Liber beneficiorum of the Archbishop of Gniezno.
