= 1939 Infantry Regiment (Poland) =

The Polish Infantry Regiment (Polish: Pulk Piechoty) was a Polish army regiment active during World War 2, comprising around 2,900 men and 60 officers on average, organised around 3 rifle battalions.

== Weaponry ==
Each battalion was armed with either the Karabinek wz.29 or the Wz. 98, 7.92mm bolt-action rifles. Each 19-man squad was also issued the RKM wz.28 light machine gun. Other regimental weapons included the Polish version of the French Model 1897 75-mm field gun, the Wz. 35 anti-tank rifle, the Ckm wz.30 heavy machine gun, the wz.31 81 mm mortar, and the wz.36 46mm light mortar/grenade launcher.

== Organization and equipment ==
- 1 Recon Company
  - 4 light machine guns
  - 2 antitank rifles
- 1 Antitank Company
  - 9 37 mm antitank guns
- 1 Pioneer Platoon
- 1 Artillery Platoon
  - 2 75 mm Mle 1897 field guns
- 1 Antigas Platoon
- 1 Communications Platoon
- 3 Rifle Battalions
  - 3 Rifle Companies
    - 9 light machine guns
    - 3 46 mm mortars
    - 3 antitank rifles
  - 1 heavy machine gun company
    - 12 heavy machine guns
    - 2 81 mm mortars
