= 26th Infantry Division (Poland) =

- 26 Dywizja Piechoty
- Active: April 1919 - September 1939
- Country: Poland
- Branch: Polish Army
- Type: Infantry
- Role: Ground warfare
- Size: Division
- Engagements: Invasion of Poland

Commanders
- Final commander: Colonel Adam Brzechwa-Ajdukiewicz

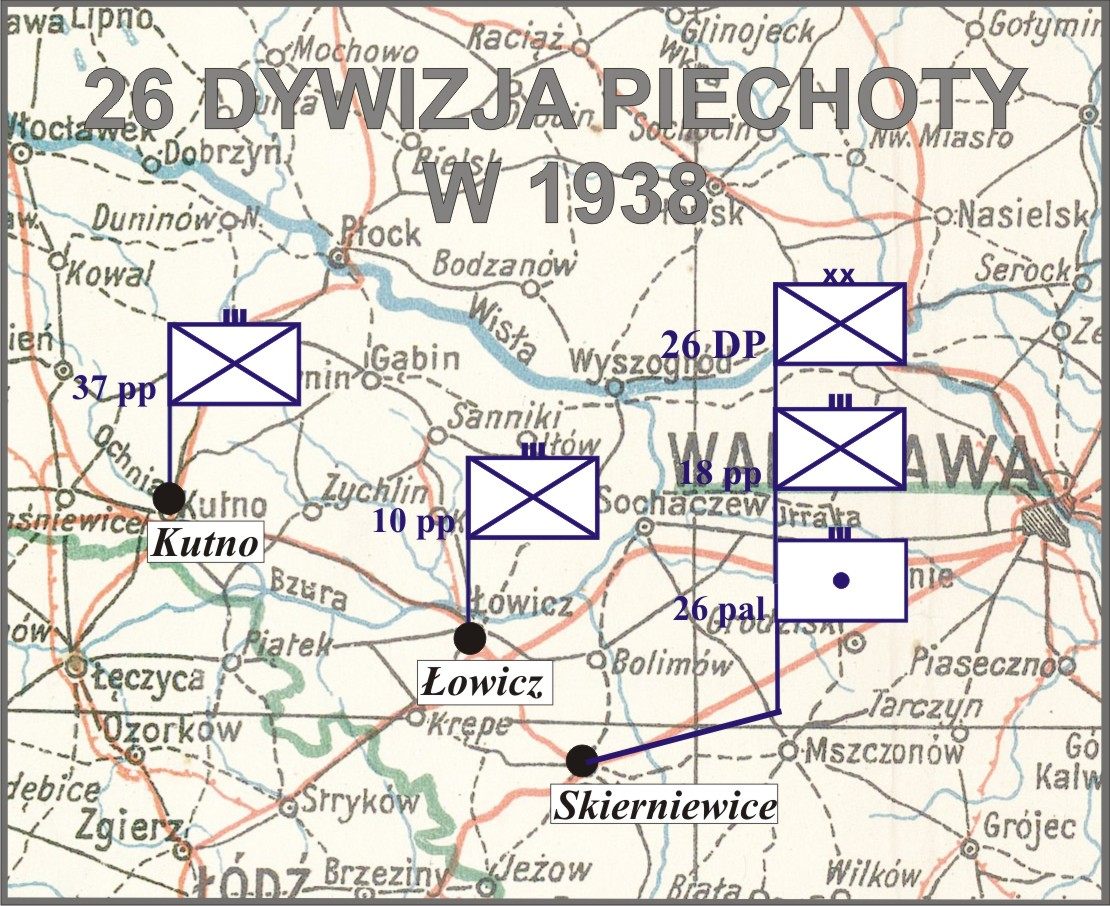
26 DP w 1938

The Polish 26th Infantry Division (Polish: 26 Dywizja Piechoty, Austrian German: 26. Infanteriedivision, Hungarian: 26. Gyaloghadosztály) was a unit of the Polish Army. Originally formed as the 4th Infantry Division (Poland) in southern Poland in April 1919, the division was renamed the 26th Infantry Division in 1921. The division would see combat in World War II, being destroyed during the German invasion of Poland in September 1939.

== History ==
The 4th Infantry Division was formed after World War I and the foundation of Poland. Raised in the former Austrian province of Galicia, its regiments were originally stationed in such towns as Cieszyn, Jarosław and Przemyśl.

In 1921 as part of the army's reorganization, the division was renamed the 26th Infantry Division and moved north to Skierniewice and its vicinity. It consisted of these regiments:

- 10th Infantry Regiment, stationed in Łowicz,
- 18th Infantry Regiment, stationed in Skierniewice,
- 37th Infantry Regiment, stationed in Kutno,
- 26th Light Artillery Regiment, stationed in Skierniewice.

During the Invasion of Poland, the Division, under Colonel Adam Brzechwa-Ajdukiewicz, was part of Poznań Army, but on the fifth day of the war it was moved to Pomorze Army and, together with the 15th I.D., it created Operational Group of General Zdzisław Przyjałkowski.

On September 6, 1939, the division was in the area of Inowrocław, soon afterwards it was used in the Battle of the Bzura, covering eastern wing of the Pomorze Army. After initial success of Polish offensive, during which the Division recaptured several locations, the Germans organized a counterattack. The 26th I.D. was subsequently destroyed.

== See also ==
- Polish army order of battle in 1939
- Polish contribution to World War II
- List of Polish divisions in World War II
