= Battle of Grudziądz =

1939 invasion of Poland battle

- Part of Invasion of Poland, World War II
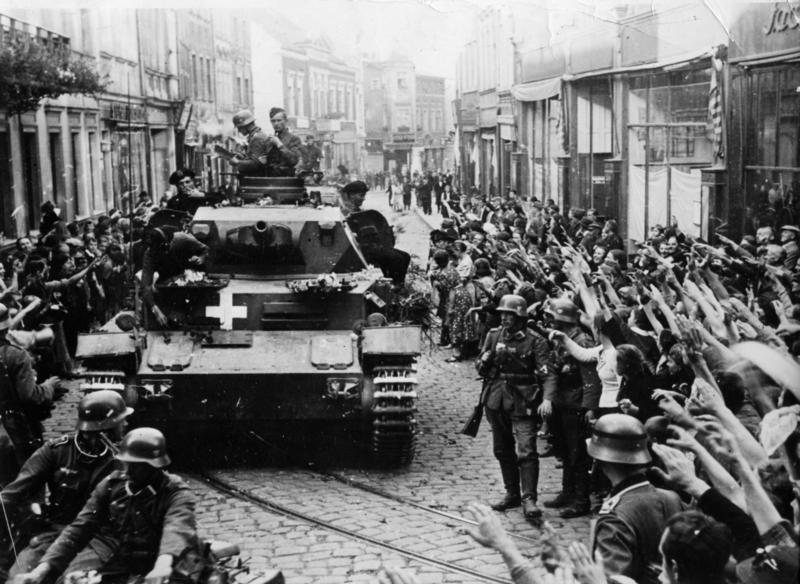
- German troops in Grudziądz (Graudenz), 4 September 1939.
Date	1–4 September 1939
Location	Grudziądz, Pomeranian Voivodeship, Poland
Result	German victory

Belligerents
Germany	Poland

Commanders and leaders
(Nazi Germany) Nikolaus von Falkenhorst	(Second Polish Republic) Mikołaj Bołtuć (Second Polish Republic) Tadeusz Lubicz-Niezabitowski (Second Polish Republic) Stanisław Świtalski

Units involved
21st Infantry Division; 218th Infantry Division	4th Infantry Division; 16th Infantry Division; 142nd air squadron

Battle of Grudziądz was a military engagement between German and Polish forces during the early days of the Invasion of Poland in September 1939. It started on 1 September and ended with a German victory on 4 September. German historiography has dealt with the fighting in the larger context of the Battle of Tuchola Forest.

The Polish border city of Grudziądz (Germ. Graudenz) contained headquarters of the 16th Infantry Division, as well as the military Center of Cavalry Training (Centrum Wyszkolenia Kawalerii). Moreover, it played a crucial role as a strongpoint in order to defend the Vistula River Line and secure the route of retreat of Polish divisions of the Pomorze Army under General Władysław Bortnowski, engaged on the left, western bank of the river. Among units stationed in the Polish Corridor were the 9th, the 15th, and the 27th I.D.'s, together with the Pomeranian Cavalry Brigade from Bydgoszcz. Since Polish headquarters had planned an armed intervention in the Free City of Danzig, the 27th I.D. and the Pomeranian Cavalry had been transferred northwards in mid-August 1939, to the area of Chojnice and Starogard Gdański. On 1 September 1939, at the moment of the invasion, both units remained in the Corridor, vulnerable to a German attack. East of the Vistula, along the line stretching from Grudziądz to Lidzbark (Germ. Lautenburg) stood the German 4th Army, under General Günther von Kluge. Grudziądz itself was defended by the Operational Group East (Grupa Operacyjna Wschód), under Gen. Mikołaj Bołtuć. The group consisted of the 4th from Toruń (Colonel Tadeusz Lubicz-Niezabitowski), and the local 16th Infantry Division (Colonel Stanisław Świtalski), both part of the Pomorze Army.

== 1 September 1939 ==
The area of Grudziądz was assaulted by the German XXI Corps (Gen. von Falkenhorst) on 1 September, when the German 21st and 218th Infantry Divisions pushed back the Polish lines behind the small river Osa, east of Grudziądz. The main German attack was concentrated on the left Polish wing, defended by the 16th I.D. In the area of Łasin, German units were halted, but another attack, near Dąbrówka Królewska, was successful. After crossing the Osa, the Germans captured a bridgehead near Bielawki. On 1 September, in the afternoon, after receiving reinforcements, the Germans continued their attack, which was finally halted by the Poles at app. 7 p.m. During the night of 1-2 September, General Bołtuć led the 4th Infantry Division in a counterattack the German 218th Infantry Division, in order to push the invaders back behind the Osa. Although Polish forces gained some ground, the attack was finally repulsed.

== 2 September 1939 ==
On 2 September, at 8 a.m., the Germans began an assault, aiming to push further back the 16th I.D. After an artillery barrage, German infantry moved into the action, managing to expand the bridgehead. The situation of Polish troops was particularly difficult in the western wing of their line of defence, and as a result, the 66th and the 64th infantry regiments (part of the 16th I.D.) had to retreat towards the Grudziądz - Jabłonowo Pomorskie railroad. To save the situation, General Bortnowski ordered 142nd squadron of the Polish Air Force (Colonel Bolesław Stachoń) to bomb German positions. The bombing did not bring any significant gains for the Poles, and in the afternoon of that day, the Poles began to retreat. Panic broke out in some Polish units, as the Wehrmacht, supported by the local Fifth Column, attacked the 208th reserve infantry regiment.

Nevertheless, General Bołtuć ordered Colonel Lubicz-Niezabitowski's 4th I.D. to counterattack, in order to help the 16th I.D., which was under heavy German pressure. The 4th I.D. attacked from Radzyń Chełmiński towards Mełno, and the assault began at 8 p.m. Initially, the Germans retreated towards Annowo and Gruta, which was recaptured by the Poles at midnight. Furthermore, Polish 65th infantry regiment recaptured Nicwałd, but the Poles were halted before they reached their original defensive positions along the Osa. On that night General Bołtuć dismissed Colonel Stanisław Świtalski, who was unable to control his men, and replaced him with Colonel Zygmunt Bohusz-Szyszko.

== 3 and 4 September 1939 ==
Sunday, 3 September 1939, began with a massive German assault on Polish positions. At the same time Bołtuć received news that the Polish divisions on the western bank of the Vistula were facing defeat and the German forces had already crossed the Vistula in the south. This forced him to pull back his units in order to avoid being soon encircled. The Polish defenders destroyed the bridges over the Vistula and retreated to the south-east, towards the Drwęca river, where they took new defensive positions. Grudziądz itself was abandoned on Sunday in the early afternoon. After a few hours, elements of the German 45th Infantry Regiment entered the city, but main German forces did not capture all of Grudziądz until the morning of 4 September, Monday.

== See also ==
- Siege of Graudenz
- List of World War II military equipment of Poland
- List of German military equipment of World War II

== Literature ==
- Eugeniusz Kozłowski (Ed.): Wojna obronna Polski 1939, Wydawnictwo Ministerstwa Obrony Nradowej, Warszawa 1979. ISBN 83-11-06314-1
- Nikolaus von Vormann: Der Feldzug 1939 in Polen, Prinz-Eugen-Verlag, Weissenburg 1958. ASIN B0000BP152
- Czesław Grzelak, Henryk Stańczyk Kampania polska 1939 roku, page 308. Oficyna Wydawnicza RYTM Warszawa, 2005. ISBN 83-7399-169-7
