= Rzeczyca =

Rzeczyca may refer to the following places:

== Poland ==
=== Kuyavian-Pomeranian Voivodeship ===
- Rzeczyca, Kuyavian-Pomeranian Voivodeship, village in Gmina Piotrków Kujawski, Radziejów County

=== Łódź Voivodeship ===
- Gmina Rzeczyca, administrative district in Tomaszów County
- Rzeczyca, Poddębice County, village in Gmina Zadzim, Poddębice County
- Rzeczyca, Gmina Rzeczyca, village in Tomaszów County

=== Lower Silesian Voivodeship ===
- Rzeczyca, Polkowice County, village in Gmina Grębocice
- Rzeczyca, Gmina Środa Śląska, village in Środa County

=== Lublin Voivodeship ===
- Rzeczyca, Gmina Międzyrzec Podlaski, village in Biała County
- Rzeczyca, Puławy County, village in Gmina Kazimierz Dolny
- Rzeczyca, Gmina Ulhówek, village in Tomaszów County

=== Lubusz Voivodeship ===
- Rzeczyca, Gmina Maszewo, village in Krosno County
- Rzeczyca, Świebodzin County, village in Gmina Świebodzin

=== Masovian Voivodeship ===
- Rzeczyca, Otwock County, settlement in Gmina Sobienie-Jeziory

=== West Pomeranian Voivodeship ===
- Rzeczyca, West Pomeranian Voivodeship, village in Gmina Tuczno, Wałcz County

== Belarus ==
- Rzeczyca, Polish name for Rechytsa, city in the Gomel Region

== See also ==
- Rečica (disambiguation) (Slovene form)
- Rēzekne (Polish: Rzeżyca), a city in the Rēzekne River valley in Latgale region of eastern Latvia
