= 4th Infantry Division (Poland) =

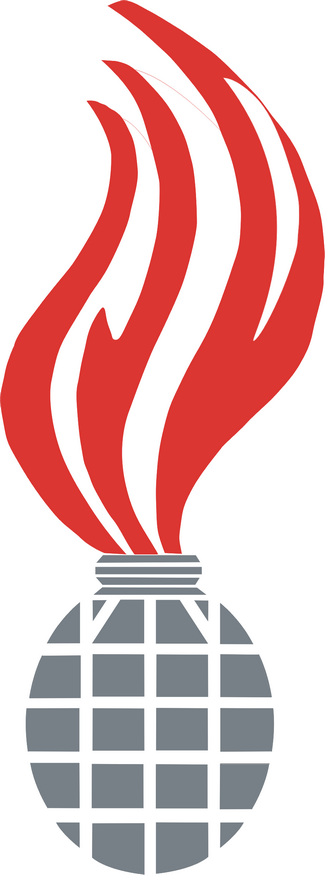
- 2nd incarnation, 1940
- Active: 1919–39; 1940–47; 1944–98
- Country: Poland
- Allegiance: In west: prewar Polish government In east: Polish communists
- Branch: Land forces
- Type: Infantry, then Mechanized
- Size: Varied by historical period
- Garrison/HQ: Toruń (1921–1939), Krosno Odrzańskie (postwar)
- Engagements: Battle of the Bzura 1939; Battle of France 1940; Vistula-Oder Offensive 1945; Battle of Kolberg 1945; Battle of Berlin 1945

Commanders
- Notable commanders: Maj. Gen. Stanisław Franciszek Sosabowski

The Polish 4th Infantry Division (Polish: 4. Dywizja Piechoty) was created following Polish independence after the end of World War I. The division participated in the Polish–Ukrainian War in 1919. During World War II, the division existed as three wholly separate organizations, the original incarnation of the division as part of the pre-war Polish Army, the second incarnation armed and equipped by the western Allies, and another division armed and equipped and controlled by the Soviet Union. The second and third incarnations of this division existed simultaneously from 1944 until 1947.

== Service to 1939 ==
Prior to the start of World War II, the 4th Infantry Division was initially commanded by Colonel Tadeusz Lubicz-Niezabitowski, and its peacetime headquarters was located in Toruń, with additional units stationed in Włocławek and Brodnica. After September 4, 1939, it was commanded by Colonel Mieczysław Rawicz-Mysłowski and then, after September 12, it was commanded by Colonel Józef Werobej. The 4th Division was originally part of the Pomorze Army and stationed northeast of Toruń, near the border of East Prussia. From September 9, the division fought against the Wehrmacht in the Battle of the Bzura, a Polish counterattack west of Warsaw in the area of the Bzura River.

=== 1919–1921 ===
The division was officially formed on April 16, 1919, in former Austrian Galicia. Its first commandants were officers serving in the Operation Group of General Franciszek Aleksandrowicz: Major Wlodzimierz Tyszkiewicz (chief of staff), General Franciszek Kraliczek-Krajowski (divisional infantry) and Colonel Adolf Engel (divisional artillery). At the beginning, the division consisted of three infantry regiments (14th, 18th and 37th), three artillery regiments (3rd field artillery, 11th field artillery and 2nd heavy artillery), and eight cavalry squadrons. All units concentrated in late April 1919 near Sadowa Wisznia. Most of the division's soldiers had served in the Austro-Hungarian Army in World War I.

The division's formation was completed in early May, and by that time it had 7,162 infantry plus 807 cavalry soldiers. Furthermore, it had 108 machine guns, 24 cannons and three armoured trains (Gromoboj, Kaniow and Odsiecz). Until late July 1919, the division fought in the Polish–Ukrainian War in eastern Galicia. On July 27, it was sent to Volhynia, and reinforced with 10th Infantry Regiment, transferred from Operational Group of Colonel Władysław Sikorski. At that time, and until 1921, the division was divided into two infantry brigades (7th and 8th), and the 4th Artillery Brigade.

=== Polish–Ukrainian War ===
On May 15, 1919, as part of Operational Group of General Waclaw Iwaszkiewicz, the division entered the conflict. Its task was to break through Ukrainian lines in the area of Mosciska – Sambor. On May 17, it captured Sambor, on the next day Drohobycz, and on May 20, Stryj. On May 25, the division was rushed to Stanisławów, preventing Ukrainian forces from capturing the city. At Stanisławów, the Poles seized Ukrainian cannons, guns, locomotives and stocks of food, ammunition and uniforms.

In late May, 4th Division crossed the Dniestr, and captured other towns, including Podhajce and Buczacz. In the area of Pokucie, its elements made contact with Romanian Army, which was allied with Poland, and which aided the Poles in the war against West Ukrainian People's Republic. In early June 1919, after protests of Western Allies, the Blue Army was withdrawn from Eastern Galicia, together with Operational Group of General Daniel Konarzewski. As a result of this movement, Polish forces in the area were weakened, and on June 11, when Ukrainian Army began its counteroffensive, 4th Division retreated in panic, behind the Gnila Lipa river, where it prepared defensive positions, together with 3rd Legions Infantry Division. On June 24 the Ukrainians broke through the positions of the 3rd Division, and Polish forces had to withdraw to the line of the Swirz river.

After receiving reinforcements, the Poles began an offensive (June 28). The division was divided into two groups, and quickly advanced, reaching Czortków and the Zbrucz river by July 15. Next day, 4th Infantry Division was replaced with elements of 3rd and 10th Divisions.

=== Polish–Soviet War ===
In the second half of July 1919, 4th Infantry Division was loaded on trains and transferred to Brody, where it became part of Volhynian Front under General Antoni Listowski. On August 8, it began an offensive, capturing Krzemieniec and Dubno in Volhynia. The frontline then stalled along the Horyn river until mid-November, when the Red Army attacked, but without any significant success. Local clashes took place along the front until late April 1920, when Polish General Staff ordered the destruction of Soviet 12th and 14th Armies, located in Volhynia and Podolia.

4th Infantry Division was included in the newly created Polish 3rd Army, and ordered to destroy Soviet 7th Rifle Division, and capture Korosten. Four assault groups were formed, and on April 25 the division attacked. On the next day, at 10 pm, Korosten was seized.

In May 1920, 4th Infantry Division was transferred by rail to Minsk in Belarus, and became part of Polish 4th Army. There, the division was reorganized and divided into three groups, commanded by Władysław Anders, Wladyslaw Tarwid and Stanislaw Tessar. Their task was to push the enemy back behind the Berezyna river. By June 5, the task was completed.

Soviet offensive in Belarus began on July 4. The division was pushed back and retreated along the line Nieswiez–Baranowicze–Slonim–Wolkowysk–Siedlce–Góra Kalwaria, reaching the Vistula on August 11. On the next day, it was incorporated into the 2nd Army, and defended the Vistula line near Magnuszew. Following the Battle of Dęblin and Minsk Mazowiecki, the division was transferred to the 5th Army under General Władysław Sikorski, and on August 17 entered Zakroczym. By late August, the division cleared northern Mazovia from Soviet elements.

In early September 1920, 4th Infantry Division was transported back to Eastern Galicia, to the area of Lwów, as reserve force of the 6th Army. On September 6, divisional 8th Brigade detrained near Chodorow, and was immediately involved in fighting the enemy. At the same time, 7th Brigade fought 1st Cavalry Army near Zolkiew.

In mid-September, the division concentrated near Przemyslany and advanced eastwards. On September 17, it captured Pomorzany, then Zborow and Troscianiec. Its advance was halted on September 20, near Wisniowiec.

In late September 1920, 4th Infantry Division was once again transported to the north, to Grodno, and was incorporated into 2nd Army. By early October, it covered Polish–Lithuanian demarcation line near Druskienniki. After Polish–Lithuanian truce was declared on October 5, the division was transferred to the rear, and in early November replaced by 2nd Legions Infantry Division

=== Second Polish Republic ===
On November 11, 1920, the division began its march from Druskienniki to Mazovia. Its headquarters was at first located in Łomża, with 7th Brigade stationed in Zambrów, and 8th Brigade in Ostrołęka. The unit was then reorganized, with help from French officers.

In April 1921, the headquarters with 14th Infantry Regiment and 7th Brigade were moved to Włocławek. 8th Brigade with 10th Regiment were stationed in Konin, and 37th Regiment in Kutno. In November of that year, the division was reorganized: its 10th, 18th and 37th Infantry Regiments were transferred to the newly created 26th Infantry Division, garrisoned at Skierniewice.

The "new" 4th Infantry Division was transferred to Toruń, and before the Invasion of Poland it consisted of the following units:

- Headquarters and staff (Toruń),
- 14th Kujavian Infantry Regiment (Włocławek),
- 63th Toruń Infantry Regiment (Toruń),
- 67th Greater Poland Infantry Regiment (Brodnica),
- 4th Kujawy Light Artillery Regiment (Inowrocław).

== 1939 Invasion of Poland ==
Following Plan West, 4th Division, commanded by Colonel Tadeusz Lubicz-Niezabitowski, belonged to Operational Group East (General Mikołaj Bołtuć), which was part of Pomorze Army (General Władysław Bortnowski). Operational Group East was ordered to defend the approaches to Toruń, and shortly before the war, field fortifications had been built near Brodnica and Jabłonowo Pomorskie.

Alarm mobilization of the division was ordered on August 24, 1939. Four days later, together with 16th Infantry Division and Jablonowo Group, it defended the line from Grudziądz to Brodnica. The 4th Division was placed on the right wing of the Polish line of defence, with Nowogródzka Cavalry Brigade located to its right. The task of the unit was to remain in battle readiness, in order to assault the enemy advancing from its positions behind the Osa river.

On September 1, 1939, the division was attacked by the German XXI Corps. Since the main German assault was concentrated on the 16th I.D., elements of the 4th Division were sent there as a reinforcement, and managed to halt the enemy. On September 3, 14th Infantry Regiment was attacked by the Luftwaffe and, as a result, Colonel Tadeusz Lubicz-Niezabitowski ordered a general retreat of the whole division. This decision was questioned by General Mikolaj Boltuc, who dismissed Lubicz-Niezabitowski, and replaced him with Colonel Mieczyslaw Rawicz-Myslowski. Nevertheless, on the night of September 3/4, the division began its retreat, due to general situation of Polish forces. By then, 14th Infantry Regiment had lost 20% of its officers and 9% of its soldiers.

On September 6, in the early afternoon, the division was located south of Toruń, where it was reinforced with additional infantry. On the night of September 6/7, it withdrew along the Vistula, to the area of Włocławek, and by September 8, the division reached Brześć Kujawski. On the night of September 9/10, the division, which was part of Operational Group of General Boltuc, was moved to the area of Kutno.

On September 10, at 1930, General Boltuc ordered 4th Infantry Division to attack from the area of Głowno. By the next morning, only 63rd Infantry Regiment had managed to cross the Bzura, and was immediately engaged in a clash with the German 20th Infantry Regiment. Meanwhile, 14th Infantry Regiment attacked the enemy near Sobota, and managed to push back the Wehrmacht.

On September 12, the division rested, while its staff decided to carry out a joint attack on Głowno, together with Wielkopolska Cavalry Brigade. The assault began at 1900: the infantry advanced slowly, as it lacked artillery support. At 2130, General Bortnowski ordered the attack to halt. Divisional commandant, Colonel Mieczyslaw Rawicz-Myslowski, decided to personally inform the fighting soldiers, but his vehicle struck a mine, killing him, together with divisional chief of staff. Due to stiff German resistance, Polish units had to withdraw to the northern bank of the Bzura river. The division still existed as a fighting unit, and on September 13, Colonel Jozef Werobej was named its new commandant.

On September 14, 4th Division attacked German positions near Łowicz, clashing with German 10th and 24th Infantry Divisions. In a series of bloody skirmishes, it lost over 500 KIA, and was then ordered by General Boltuc to withdraw behind the Bzura, failing to seize the strategic town of Łowicz, with its railroad junction. On September 15, the division took defensive positions along the Bzura, keeping some elements on the right bank of the river. On September 16, the Germans began the attack on Urzecze, which was defended by 14th Regiment. Their advance was temporarily halted, but other Wehrmacht units threatened the wings of the division, and Colonel Werobej decided to order a withdrawal. After heavy fighting, the Poles reached the village of Zduny. On September 17, the division was attacked by the Luftwaffe, which decimated the soldiers. Tired and hungry, the unit headed to a forest near Brzeziny, where it abandoned all cannons.

In the morning of September 18, the 14th Regiment was ordered to protect the wings of Armies Poznań and Pomorze, which retreated towards Warsaw, via Kampinos Forest. A skirmish took place along the road from Sochaczew to Wyszogród, after which the division suffered heavy losses and ceased to exist as a cohesive fighting unit.

In the evening of September 19, the survivors of the battle reached Kazuń Nowy, where they rested. By September 21, General Boltuc's Operational Group had shrunk to 1,000 soldiers. The group was tasked with defending ammunition depot at Palmiry, but it failed to reach the village. Harassed by the Wehrmacht, most of the soldiers were KIA, including General Boltuc himself, who was killed near Łomianki.

== Order of Battle of the 4th Infantry Division in September 1939 ==
- Headquarters and Staff. Divisional commandants: Colonel Tadeusz Lubicz-Niezabitowski (September 1–4 and 12–13, 1939), Colonel Mieczyslaw Rawicz-Myslowski (September 4–12, KIA on September 12 near Głowno), Colonel Jozef Werobej (September 13–18, captured by the Germans on September 18, 1939), General Mikołaj Bołtuć (September 19–21, KIA in the night of September 21/22 near Łomianki).
- 14th Kujawy Infantry Regiment,
- 63rd Toruń Infantry Regiment,
- 67th Greater Poland Infantry Regiment,
- 4th Kujawy Light Artillery Regiment,
- other units, such as 4th Sapper Battalion, 4th Regiment of Heavy Artillery, cavalry squadron, 81st Machine Gun Company, 81st Company of Cyclists, military police, Field Hospital Nr. 801.

== Divisional Commandants ==
- General Franciszek Aleksandrowicz (16 IV – 19 IX 1919),
- General Franciszek Krajowski (19 IX – 20 XII 1919),
- General Leonard Skierski (1 I – 21 V 1920),
- Colonel Stanislaw Zygmunt Kaliszek (21 V – 21 VIII 1920)
- Colonel Ferdynand Zarzycki (22 VIII – 24 IX 1920)
- Colonel Wlodzimierz Ostoja-Zagorski (25 IX – 23 XI 1920)
- Colonel Franciszek Sikorski (24 XI 1920 – I 1921),
- General Henryk Minkiewicz (IV 1921 – 1 V 1922),
- General Franciszek Zielinski (6 VI 1922 – 19 X 1924)
- General Ferdynand Zarzycki (3 XII 1924 – VII 1927)
- General Wlodzimierz Maxymowicz-Raczynski (31 VII 1927 – 28 IV 1937),
- General Mikołaj Bołtuć (28 IV 1937 – VIII 1939),
- Colonel Mieczyslaw Rawicz-Myslowski (VIII – 1 IX 1939),
- Colonel Tadeusz Lubicz-Niezabitowski (1-4 and 12-13 IX 1939)
- Colonel Mieczyslaw Rawicz-Myslowski (4-12 IX 1939)
- Colonel Jozef Werobej (13-18 IX 1939)
- General Mikołaj Bołtuć (19-21 IX 1939).

== 4th Division organized by the western Allies ==
Following the Polish defeat in 1939, the 4th Infantry Division was reconstituted in France, under the command of Stanisław Franciszek Sosabowski. The 4th was assigned to a training camp in Parthenay, in western France. The French high command was reluctant to give the 4th Infantry Division weapons sorely need at the front, so the 4th was forced to train with pre-World War I weapons. By the time of the German invasion of France, only around 3,500 men, out of 11,000, of the 4th Division had been armed. When the impending French defeat became apparent, Sosabowski ordered his forces to retreat to the Atlantic coast. 6,000 Polish soldiers were evacuated from La Pallice, a harbor near La Rochelle, France. In June they were evacuated for England, and the 4th Infantry Division was again reconstituted in Scotland, under the Polish I Corps, along with the Polish 1st Armored Division, the 1st Independent Parachute Brigade, and the 16th Independent Armored Brigade. The 4th Division was charged with coastal defense of eastern Scotland, against the threat of a German invasion from Norway. This western incarnation of the 4th Division saw no combat after the defeat of France in 1940, and was inactivated in 1947.

== 4th Division organized by the Soviet Union ==
In 1944, the Soviet Union also stood up a Polish 4th Infantry Division within the so-called Polish First Army, part of the 1st Belorussian Front. The division’s overall personnel consisted primarily of Poles deported to the Union of Soviet Socialist Republics after the Soviet invasion of Poland in 1939, although most of the officers and commissars were from the USSR. As part of the First Army, this eastern incarnation of the 4th Division fought in Poland near Warsaw, at Kolberg, and north of Berlin in Germany during 1944–45.

After the war, the Soviet-organised 4th Division was incorporated into the army of the Polish People's Republic. By a Resolution of the Provisional Government of May 26, 1945, the division's personnel and equipment (with the exception of the artillery and the sanitary battalion) served as a nucleus to form the staff and some branches of the Internal Security Corps (KBW). The division commander became the Internal Security Corps' first commander.

After reforming from two reserve infantry regiments, the division was stationed in Krosno Odrzańskie as part of the Silesian Military District. During the Cold War, the division became mechanised on the organisational lines of Soviet motor rifle divisions.

The 4th Division also participated in the suppression of protests in Poznań in 1956.

The 4th Mechanized Division was inactivated in 1998.

== See also ==
- Polish army order of battle in 1939
- Polish contribution to World War II
- List of Polish divisions in World War II
