= Tadeusz Lubicz-Niezabitowski =

Polish colonel

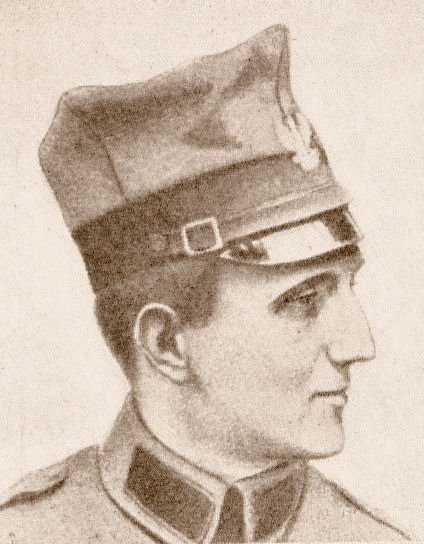
- Lubicz-Niezabitowski in 1918
- Born: May 22, 1896; Leżajsk, Kingdom of Galicia and Lodomeria, Austria-Hungary
- Died: December 26, 1952 (aged 56); London, England, United Kingdom
- Military career
- Allegiance: Austria-Hungary; Poland
- Branch: Polish Legions; Polish Armed Forces; Polish Armed Forces in the West
- Service years: 1914 – 1945
- Units: 1st Infantry Regiment; 3rd Legions Infantry Division; Polish General Staff; Command of Corps District No. VI; Border Defence Corps Regiment "Sarny"; 4th Infantry Division
- Conflicts: World War I Polish–Soviet War; World War II: Battle of Grudziądz

Tadeusz Ludwik Lubicz-Niezabitowski (May 22, 1896 – December 26, 1952) was a Polish colonel who served the Polish Armed Forces and was notable for his participation in the Battle of Grudziądz during the Invasion of Poland.

== Biography ==
Niezabitowski was born in Leżajsk as a member of the families of Walerian and Jadwiga née Przybylska. In 1907 he graduated from primary school in Tarnobrzeg. During World War I, he fought in the Polish Legions. He was an officer in the 1st Infantry Regiment of the Polish Legions . On December 15, 1915, he was appointed ensign, and on November 1, 1916, to infantry lieutenant.

In the 1921–1922 he was a student of the First Training Course at the Wyższa Szkoła Wojenna in Warsaw. On May 3, 1922, he was verified with the rank of major with seniority on June 1, 1919, and was ranked 521 in the corps of infantry officers.

After completing the course and obtaining the "full qualifications to perform service in the positions of the General Staff", he was assigned to the command of the 3rd Legions Infantry Division in Zamość as the chief of staff. On August 1, 1924, he was transferred to the 1st Division of the Polish General Staff to the position of a clerk. On January 26, 1928, he was promoted to senior lieutenant – colonel on January 1, 1928, and in the 70th position in the corps of infantry officers. In March 1928 he replaced Col. SG Adam Koc as the chief of staff of the Command of the Command of Corps District No. VI in Lviv. During his studies at WSWoj. and during the staff service he was a full-time officer in the 23rd infantry regiment in Włodzimierz. In May 1930 he was transferred to the Border Protection Corps to the position of the commander of the regiment of the Border Defence Corps Regiment "Sarny". On January 26, 1935, he was promoted to senior colonel on January 1, 1935, and was ranked 3rd in the corps of infantry officers. On September 29, 1936, he became the chief of staff of the State Air Defense Inspector, Brigadier General Józef Zając. In August 1939, he was transferred to the position of the infantry commander of the 4th Infantry Division in Toruń.

After Brig. Gen. Mikołaj Bołtuć of the command of the "East" Operational Group was appointed commander of the 4th Infantry Division. On the third day of the Invasion of Poland, during the Battle of the Osa, General Bołtuć took his division command from him and appointed him the commander of the division's infantry commander of the 4th Infantry Division, which he had previously held by Col. Dipl. Mieczysław Rawicz-Mysłowski . On September 12, during the Battle of the Bzura, he again took command of the 4th Infantry Division after the fallen colonel Rawicz-Mysłowski. The next day, he handed over the command of the division to Józef Werobej.

After the fights ended, he was in German captivity, including in the Oflag VII-A Murnau. In the spring of 1945, he received a negative opinion from Maj. Gen. Juliusz Rómmel, who stated that Colonel Niezabitowski was "a fantastic unfit for the line, he could ultimately work in the military and office space. Unsuitable."

He died on November 26, 1952, in London.

== Awards ==
- Virtuti Militari, Silver Cross (1921) Commander-in-Chief Decree L. 2980 of May 17, 1921
- Cross of Independence (January 20, 1931)
- Order of Polonia Restituta, Officer's Cross
- Order of Polonia Restituta, Knight's Cross
- Cross of Valour (Awarded four times)
- Cross of Merit, Gold Cross
- Commemorative Medal for the War of 1918–1921
- Medal of the Decade of Regained Independence

=== Foreign awards ===
- Estonia: Cross of Liberty
- Latvia: Order of Lāčplēsis,3rd class (1922)
- Yugoslavia: Medal of Miloš Obilić
