= Słup, Kuyavian-Pomeranian Voivodeship =

Słup
- Village
- Location within Poland
- Coordinates: 53°28′N 19°2′E
- Country: Poland
- Voivodeship: Kuyavian-Pomeranian
- County: Grudziądz
- Gmina: Gruta

Słup [swup] is a village in the administrative district of Gmina Gruta, within Grudziądz County, Kuyavian-Pomeranian Voivodeship, in north-central Poland.

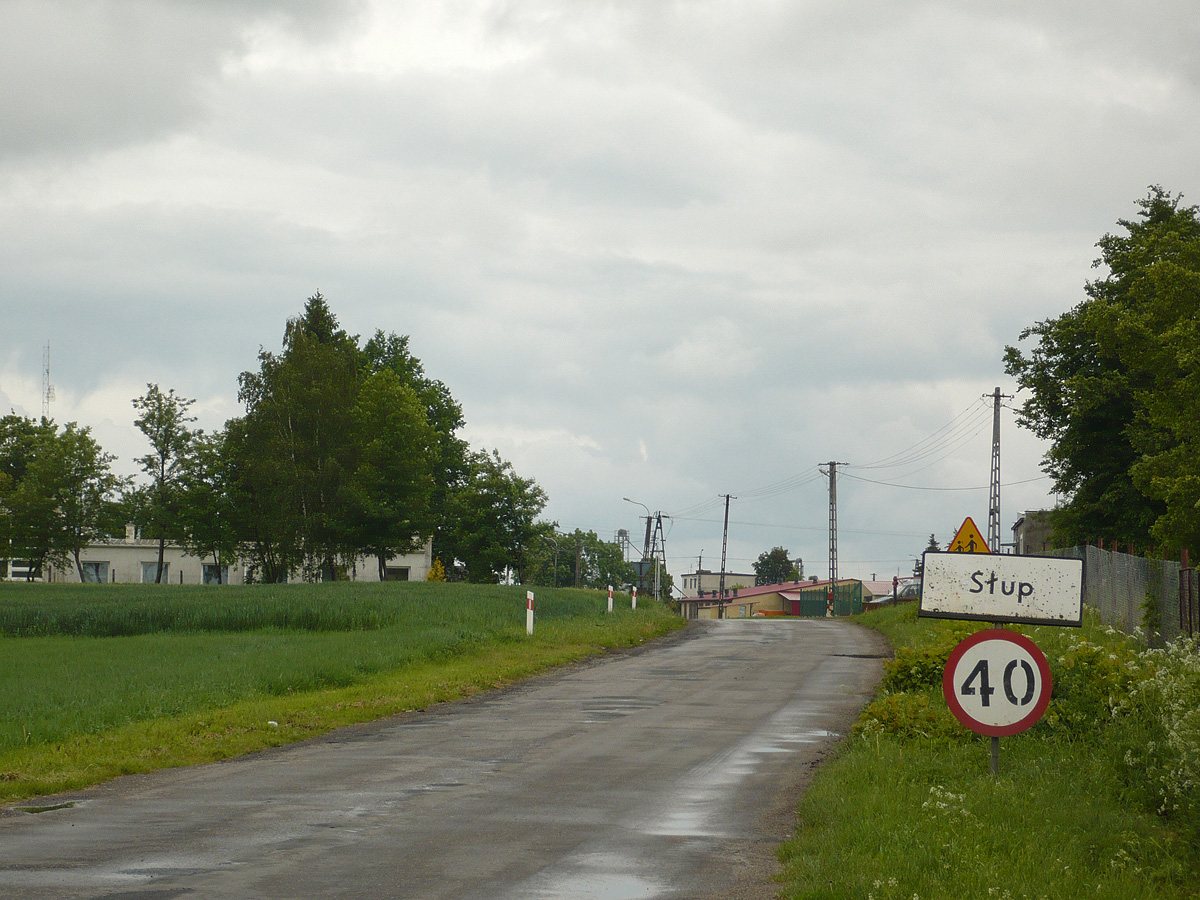
Street in Slup
