= Gmina Gruta =

Gmina Gruta Gruta Commune
- Gmina
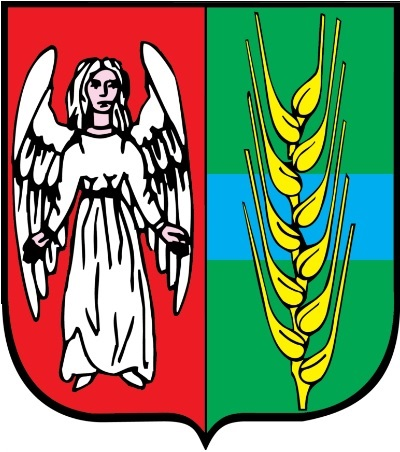
- Coat of arms
- Interactive map of Gmina Gruta
- Coordinates (Gruta): 53°27′9″N 18°57′24″E
- Country: Poland
- Voivodeship: Kuyavian-Pomeranian
- County: Grudziądz County
- Seat: Gruta

Area
  - Total: 123.77 km^{2} (47.79 sq mi)

Population (2006)
  - Total: 6,539
  - Density: 52.83/km^{2} (136.8/sq mi)

Gmina Gruta is a rural gmina (administrative district) in Grudziądz County, Kuyavian-Pomeranian Voivodeship, in north-central Poland. Its seat is the village of Gruta, which is approximately 13 kilometres (8 mi) east of Grudziądz and 52 km (32 mi) north-east of Toruń.

The gmina covers an area of 123.77 square kilometres (47.8 sq mi) and, in 2006, its total population was 6,539.

== Villages ==
Gmina Gruta contains the villages and settlements of Annowo, Boguszewo, Dąbrówka Królewska, Gołębiewko, Gruta, Jasiewo, Kitnowo, Mełno, Mełno-Cukrownia, Nicwałd, Okonin, Orle, Plemięta, Pokrzywno, Salno, Słup and Wiktorowo.

== Neighbouring gminas ==
Gmina Gruta is bordered by the gminas of Grudziądz, Łasin, Radzyń Chełmiński, Rogóźno and Świecie nad Osą.
