= Wiktorowo, Grudziądz County =

Wiktorowo
- Village
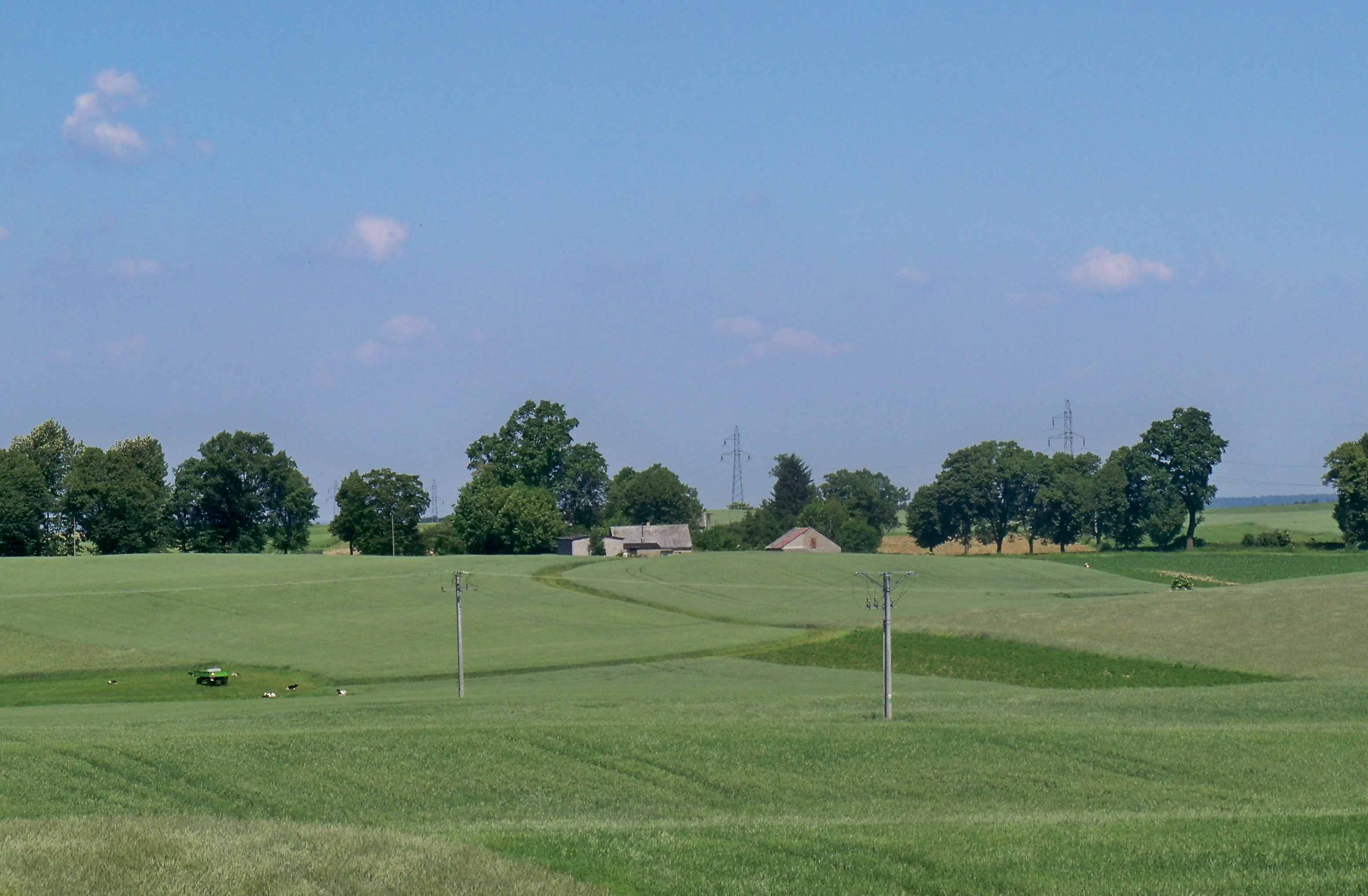

- Location within Poland
- Coordinates: 53°24′12″N 18°51′33″E
- Country: Poland
- Voivodeship: Kuyavian-Pomeranian
- County: Grudziądz
- Gmina: Gruta

Wiktorowo [viktɔˈrɔvɔ] is a village in the administrative district of Gmina Gruta, within Grudziądz County, Kuyavian-Pomeranian Voivodeship, in north-central Poland.
