= Salno, Grudziądz County =

Salno
- Village
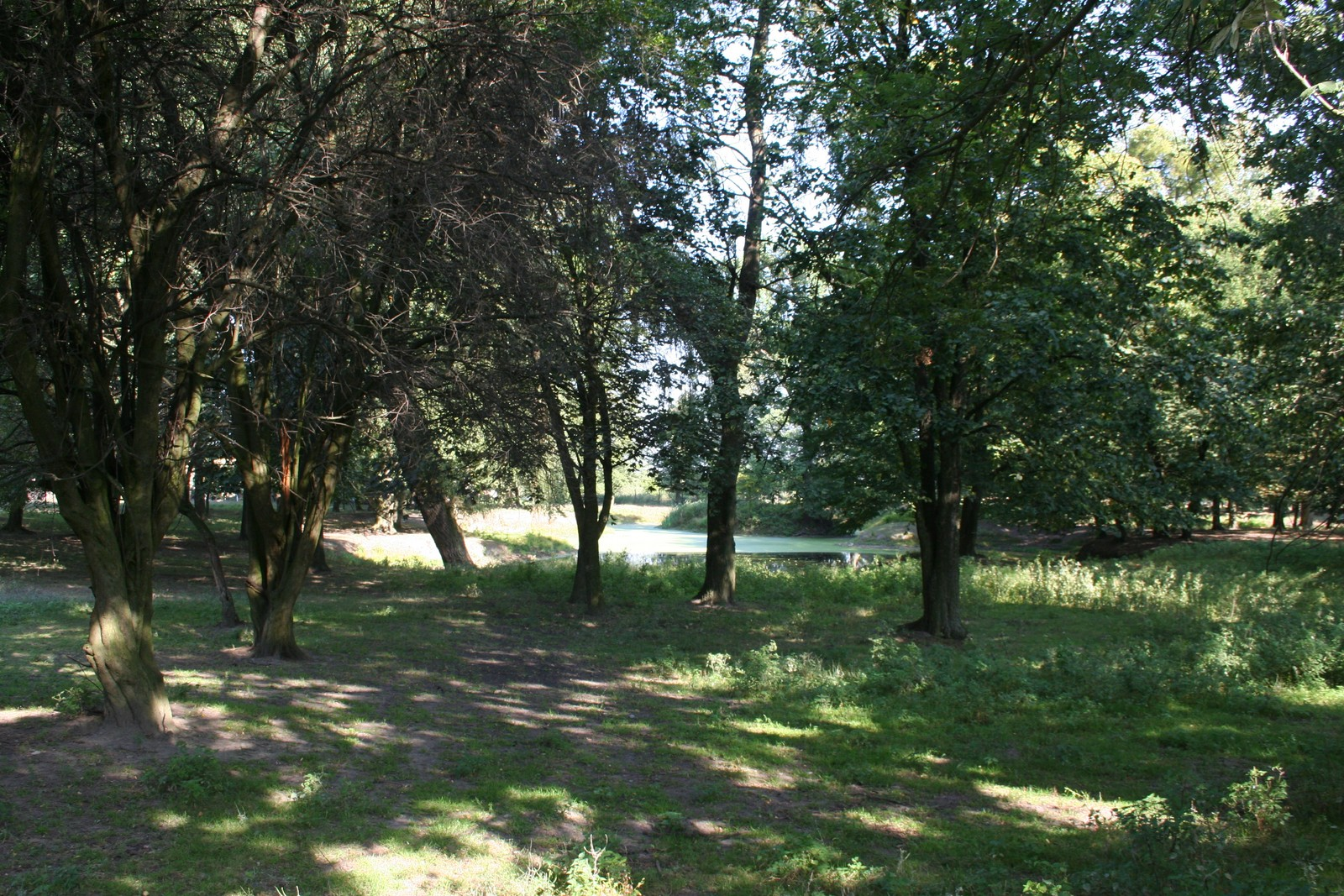
- Old manor park in Salno

- Location within Poland
- Coordinates: 53°29′7″N 18°55′59″E
- Country: Poland
- Voivodeship: Kuyavian-Pomeranian
- County: Grudziądz
- Gmina: Gruta
- Population: 220
- Time zone: UTC+1 (CET)
  - Summer (DST): UTC+2 (CEST)
- Vehicle registration: CGR

Salno [ˈsalnɔ] is a village in the administrative district of Gmina Gruta, within Grudziądz County, Kuyavian-Pomeranian Voivodeship, in north-central Poland.

== History ==
During the German occupation of Poland (World War II), Salno was one of the sites of executions of Poles, carried out by the Germans in 1939 as part of the Intelligenzaktion.
