= Mełno-Cukrownia =

- Village
- Location within Poland
- Coordinates: 53°26′27″N 18°56′52″E
- Country: Poland
- Voivodeship: Kuyavian-Pomeranian
- County: Grudziądz
- Gmina: Gruta

Mełno-Cukrownia [ˈmɛu̯nɔ t͡suˈkrɔvɲa] is a village in the administrative district of Gmina Gruta, within Grudziądz County, Kuyavian-Pomeranian Voivodeship, in north-central Poland.
