= Pokrzywno, Grudziądz County =

Pokrzywno
- Village
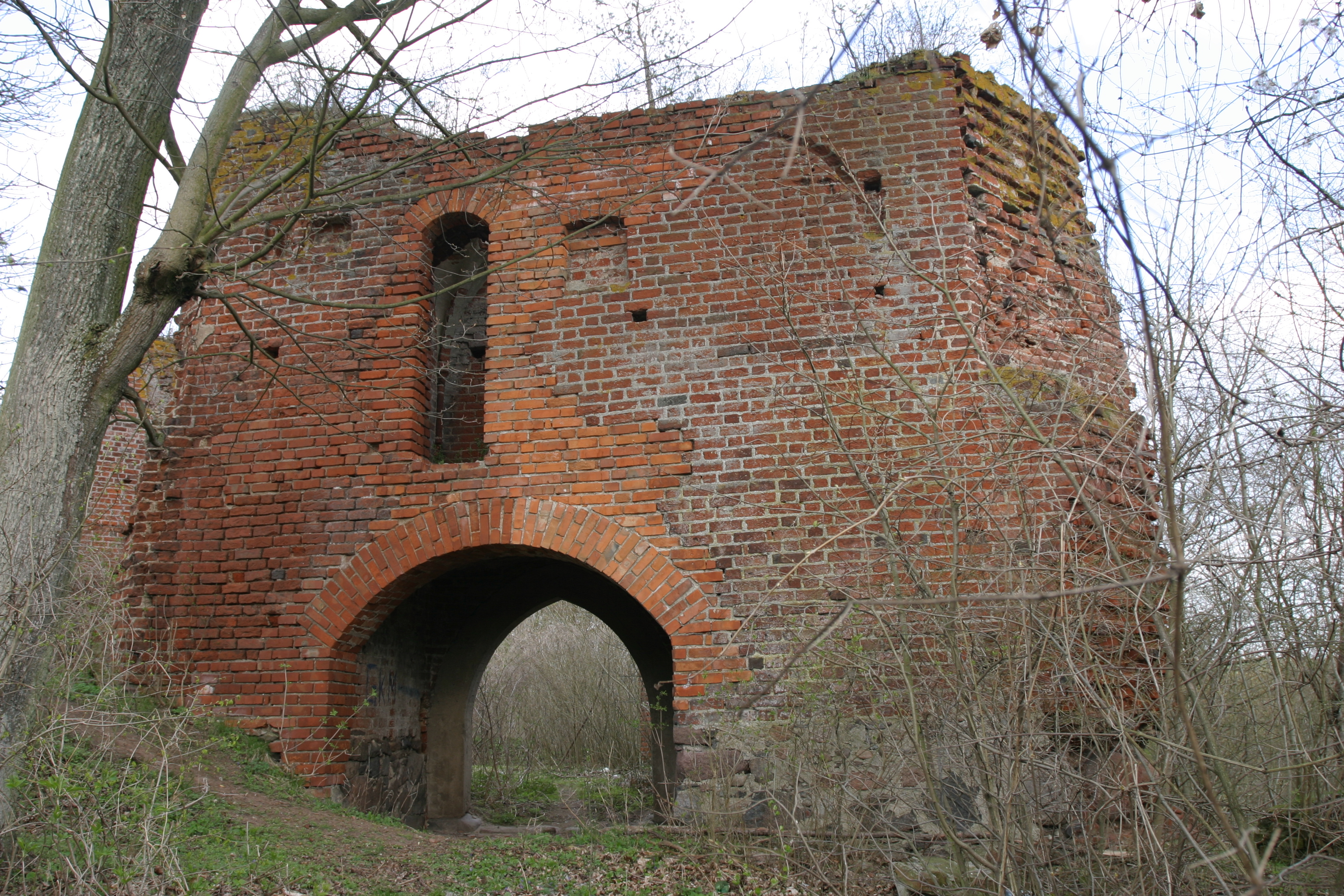
- Castle ruins in the village

- Location within Poland
- Coordinates: 53°27′N 18°51′E
- Country: Poland
- Voivodeship: Kuyavian-Pomeranian
- County: Grudziądz
- Gmina: Gruta
- Population: 300
- Time zone: UTC+1 (CET)
  - Summer (DST): UTC+2 (CEST)
- Vehicle registration: CBR

Pokrzywno [pɔˈkʂɨvnɔ] is a village in the administrative district of Gmina Gruta, within Grudziądz County, Kuyavian-Pomeranian Voivodeship, in north-central Poland.

== History ==
The area formed part of Poland since the country's establishment in the 10th century. The village was mentioned in a document from 1222 under its Latinized name Copriven. Its Old Polish name was Koprzywno. A castle was built here by the Teutonic Order in 1242, on the site of an older fortification. Between 1278 and 1416 it was the seat of a commandery. During the Polish–Lithuanian–Teutonic War, in 1410, the castle was captured by the Poles, and it was granted by King Władysław II Jagiełło to Dobiesław of Oleśnica. In 1454, it was recaptured by Poles, and made the seat of starosts (local administrators). The castle chapel was damaged severely by fire in 1611, but was soon renovated by starost Ludwik Mortęski. In 1657, the castle was conquered by the Swedish army during the Deluge. The castle chapel was destroyed again, however, it was soon renovated again by starost Jan Dominik Działyński. In 1789, the chapel of the castle collapsed. The semi-ruined castle was later used as a quarry, supplying building materials for houses and roads nearby. Ruins of the castle still remain in the village.

In 1905, the village had 288 inhabitants.
