= Gołębiewko, Kuyavian-Pomeranian Voivodeship =

Gołębiewko
- Village
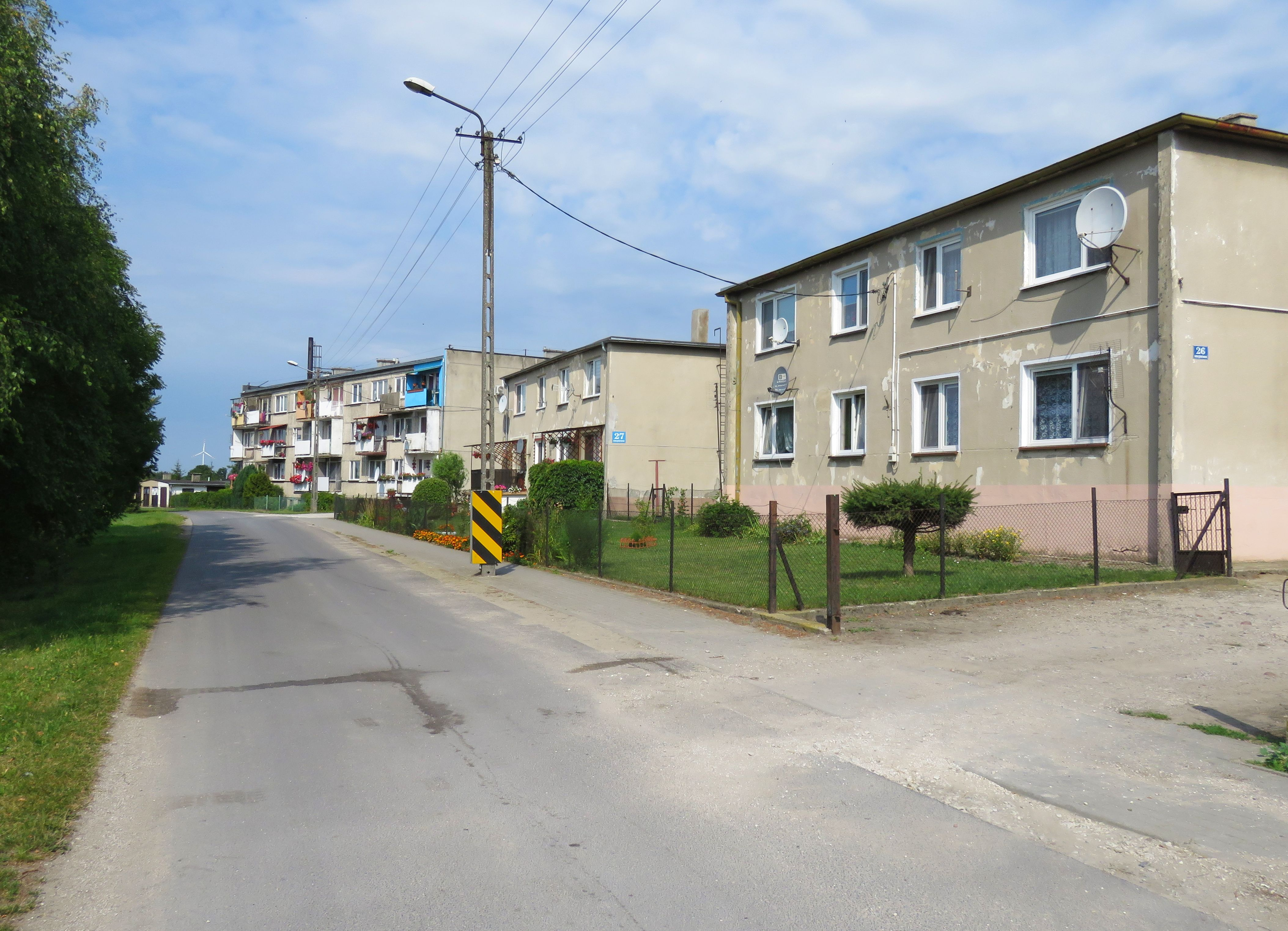

- Location within Poland
- Coordinates: 53°24′26″N 19°00′48″E
- Country: Poland
- Voivodeship: Kuyavian-Pomeranian
- County: Grudziądz
- Gmina: Gruta
- Time zone: UTC+1 (CET)
  - Summer (DST): UTC+2 (CEST)
- Vehicle registration: CGR

Gołębiewko [ɡɔwɛmˈbjɛfkɔ] is a village in the administrative district of Gmina Gruta, within Grudziądz County, Kuyavian-Pomeranian Voivodeship, in north-central Poland. It is located in Chełmno Land within the historic region of Pomerania.

== History ==
During the German occupation of Poland (World War II), Gołębiewko was one of the sites of executions of Poles, carried out by the Germans in 1939 as part of the Intelligenzaktion. In 1940, the occupiers also carried out expulsions of Poles, who were deported either to the General Government in the more eastern part of German-occupied Poland or to forced labour in Germany, while their houses and farms were handed over to Germans as part of the Lebensraum policy.
