= Orle, Grudziądz County =

Orle
- Village
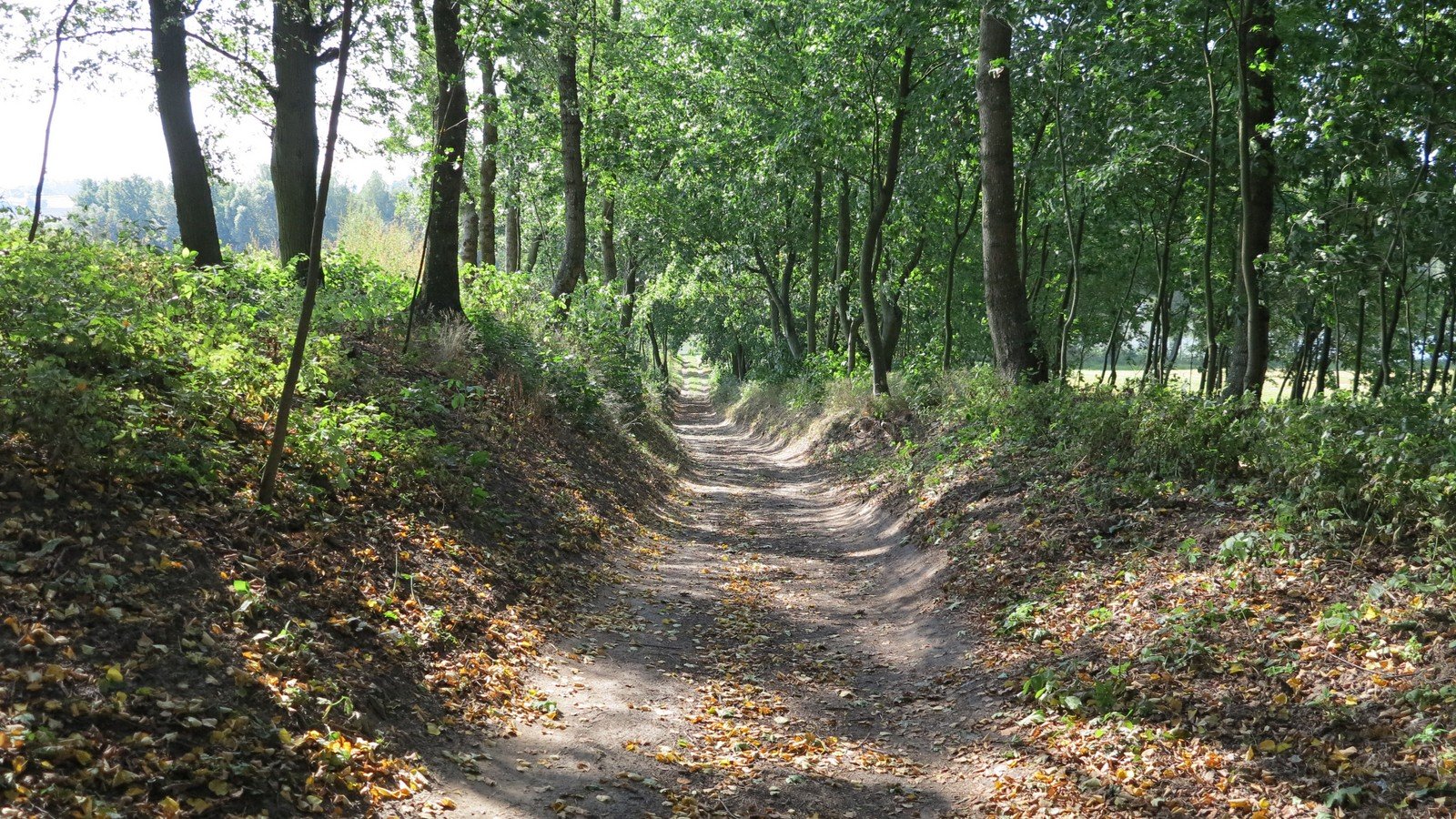

- Location within Poland
- Coordinates: 53°28′53″N 18°59′19″E
- Country: Poland
- Voivodeship: Kuyavian-Pomeranian
- County: Grudziądz
- Gmina: Gruta

Orle [ˈɔrlɛ] is a village in the administrative district of Gmina Gruta, within Grudziądz County, Kuyavian-Pomeranian Voivodeship, in north-central Poland.
