= Kitnowo, Kuyavian-Pomeranian Voivodeship =

Kitnowo
- Village
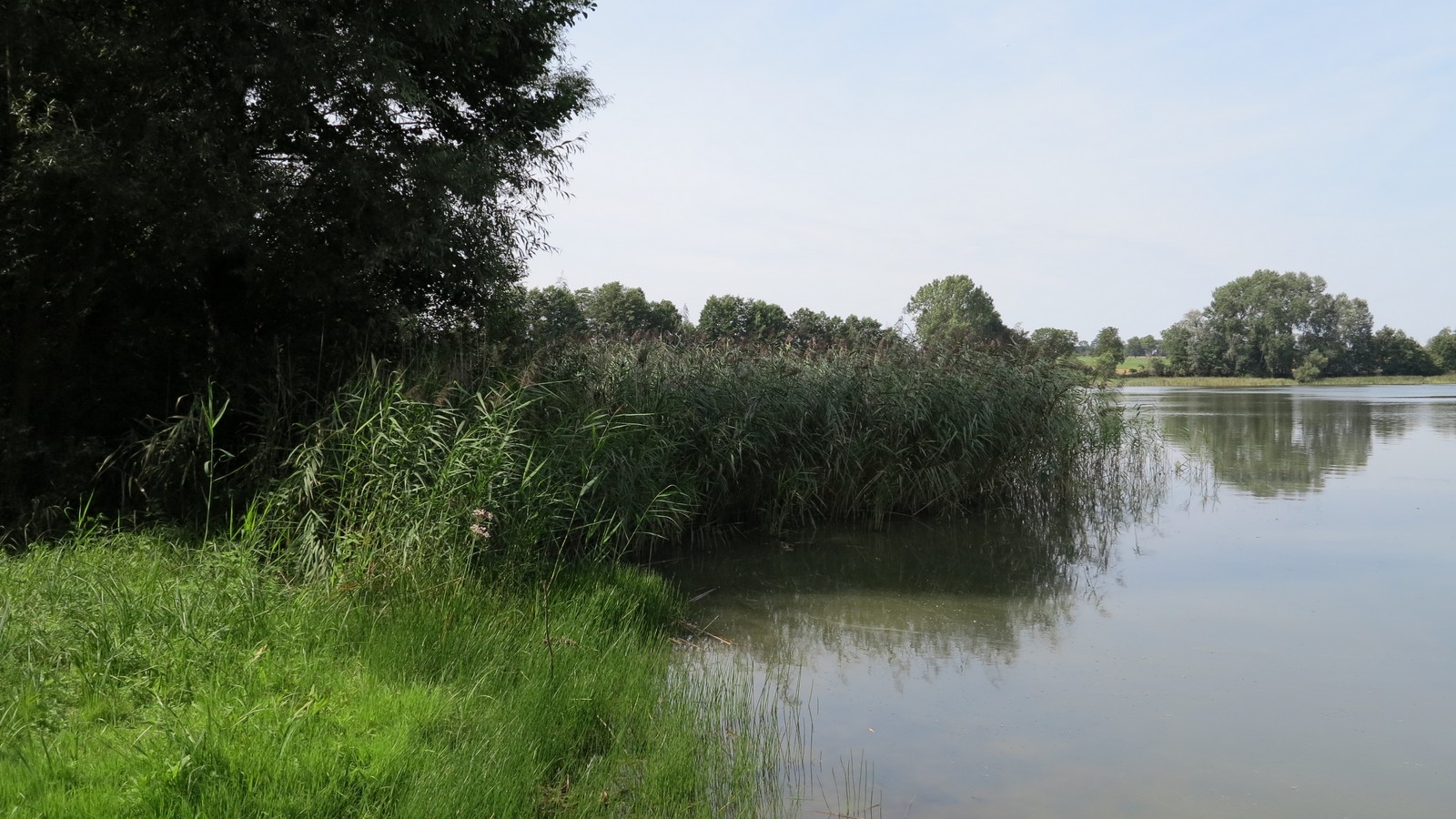
- Kitnowo Park

- Location within Poland
- Coordinates: 53°24′59″N 18°59′37″E
- Country: Poland
- Voivodeship: Kuyavian-Pomeranian
- County: Grudziądz
- Gmina: Gruta

Kitnowo [kitˈnɔvɔ] is a village in the administrative district of Gmina Gruta, within Grudziądz County, Kuyavian-Pomeranian Voivodeship, in north-central Poland.
