= Battle of Łomianki =

1939 WWII battle in Poland

- Part of German invasion of Poland
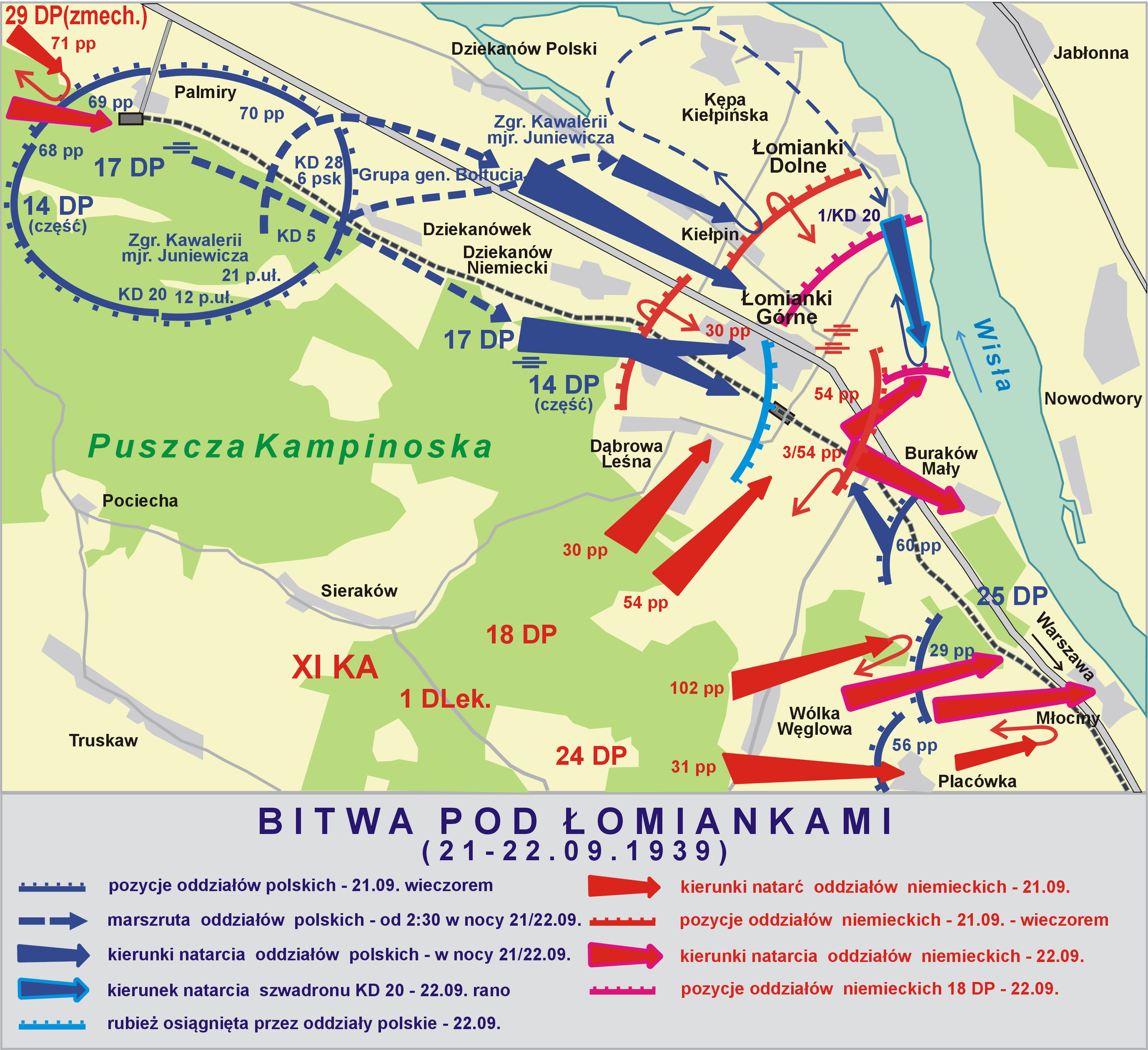
- Troop movements during the battle
| Date | 22 September 1939 |
| Location | Łomianki 52.3357°N 20.8953°E |
| Result | German victory |

Belligerents
| Germany | (Second Polish Republic) Poland |

Commanders and leaders
| (Nazi Germany) Rudolf Koch-Erpach | (Second Polish Republic) Mikołaj Bołtuć † |

Units involved
| (Nazi Germany) 8th Infantry Division | (Second Polish Republic) Various remaining Battle of Bzura units |

Strength
| Unknown | 5,000 |

Casualties and losses
| Unknown | 800 |

The Battle of Łomianki was a part of the opening campaign of World War II during the 1939 German invasion of Poland, fought between Polish and German forces. It was a failed counter-offensive attempt by the Polish forces.

== Background ==
After the defeat of two Polish Armies in the Battle of Bzura, except for a few units, all Polish divisions and brigades were cut off in Western Poland. They had no choice, but to withdraw to Modlin Fortress or Warsaw. A couple divisions and brigades did successfully reach Warsaw, but majority were halted by the Germans who were about to close the ring around the Polish capital. Around 5,000 Polish soldiers and officers led by General Mikołaj Bołtuć decided to fight by Łomianki.

== Battle ==
The Poles were opposed by 3 German infantry divisions who dug in. In spite of the low odds of success, a combined assault of the Polish infantry, cavalry, and police did find a weak spot and penetrated the 1st line of the German defenses. However, afterward, the Poles made no progress.

== Aftermath ==
800 Poles ended up dead. Moreover, 4,000 were seriously wounded. Only about 200 men survived the battle suffering only minor injuries. General Mikołaj Bołtuć, the commanding officer was killed by sniper fire while leading the charge. The German losses are unknown.

== See also ==
- List of World War II military equipment of Poland
- List of German military equipment of World War II
