= Okonin, Grudziądz County =

Okonin
- Village
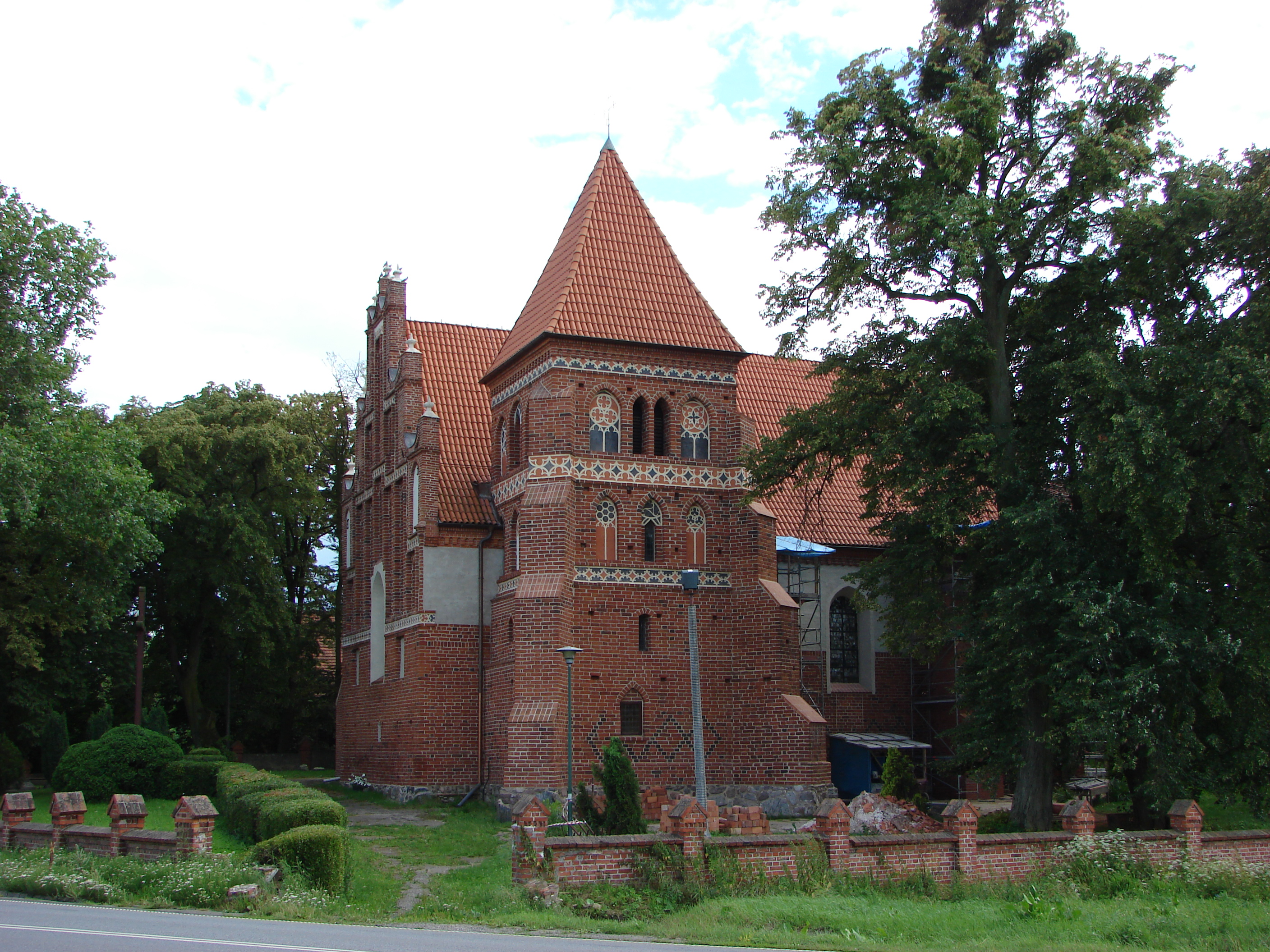
- Parish church dedicated to Saints Cosmas and Damian. Built in mid-14th century.

- Location within Poland
- Coordinates: 53°26′10″N 18°54′0″E
- Country: Poland
- Voivodeship: Kuyavian-Pomeranian
- County: Grudziądz
- Gmina: Gruta

Okonin [ɔˈkɔnin] is a village in the administrative district of Gmina Gruta, within Grudziądz County, Kuyavian-Pomeranian Voivodeship, in north-central Poland.
