= Jasiewo =

- Village
- Location within Poland
- Coordinates: 53°28′0″N 19°0′30″E
- Country: Poland
- Voivodeship: Kuyavian-Pomeranian
- County: Grudziądz
- Gmina: Gruta

Jasiewo [jaˈɕɛvɔ] is a village in the administrative district of Gmina Gruta, within Grudziądz County, Kuyavian-Pomeranian Voivodeship, in north-central Poland.

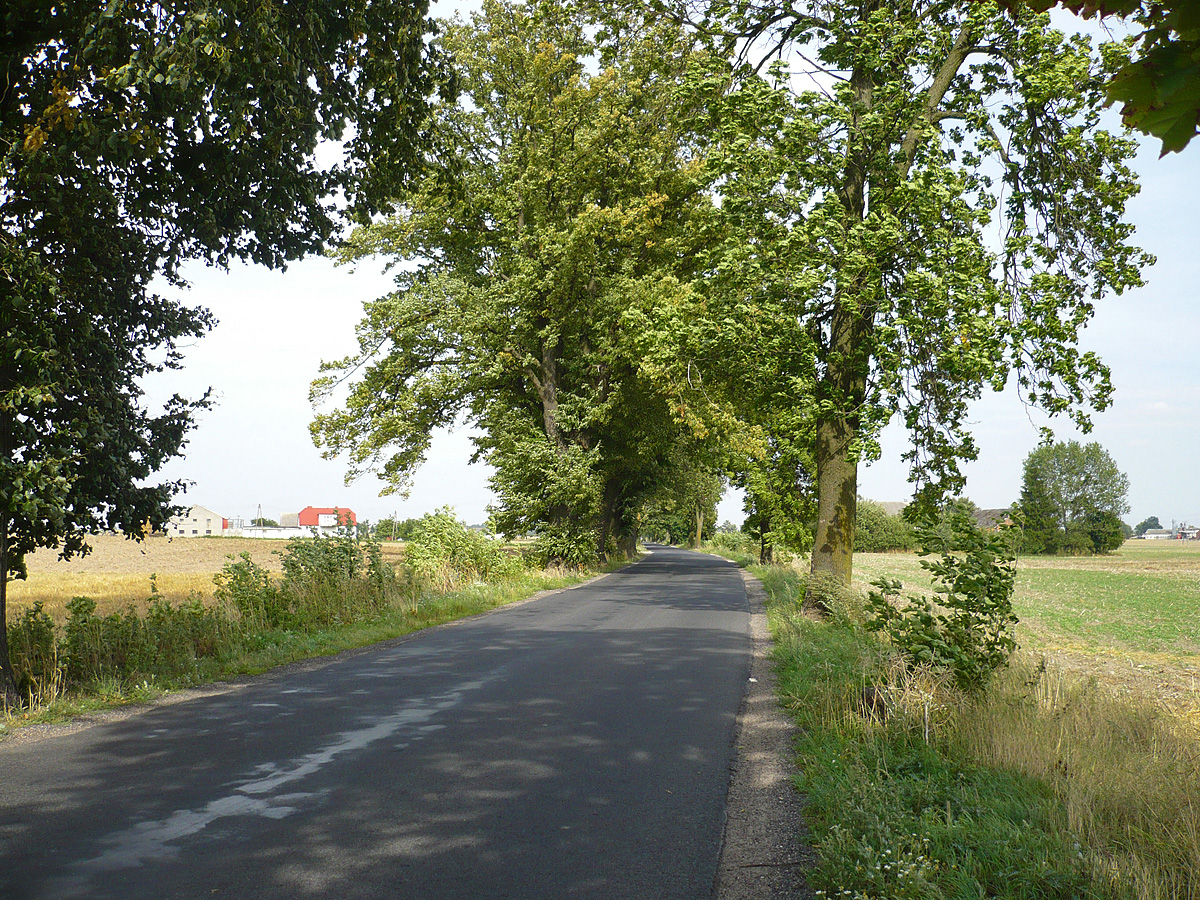
Street in Jasiewo
