= Annowo, Grudziądz County =

Annowo
- Village
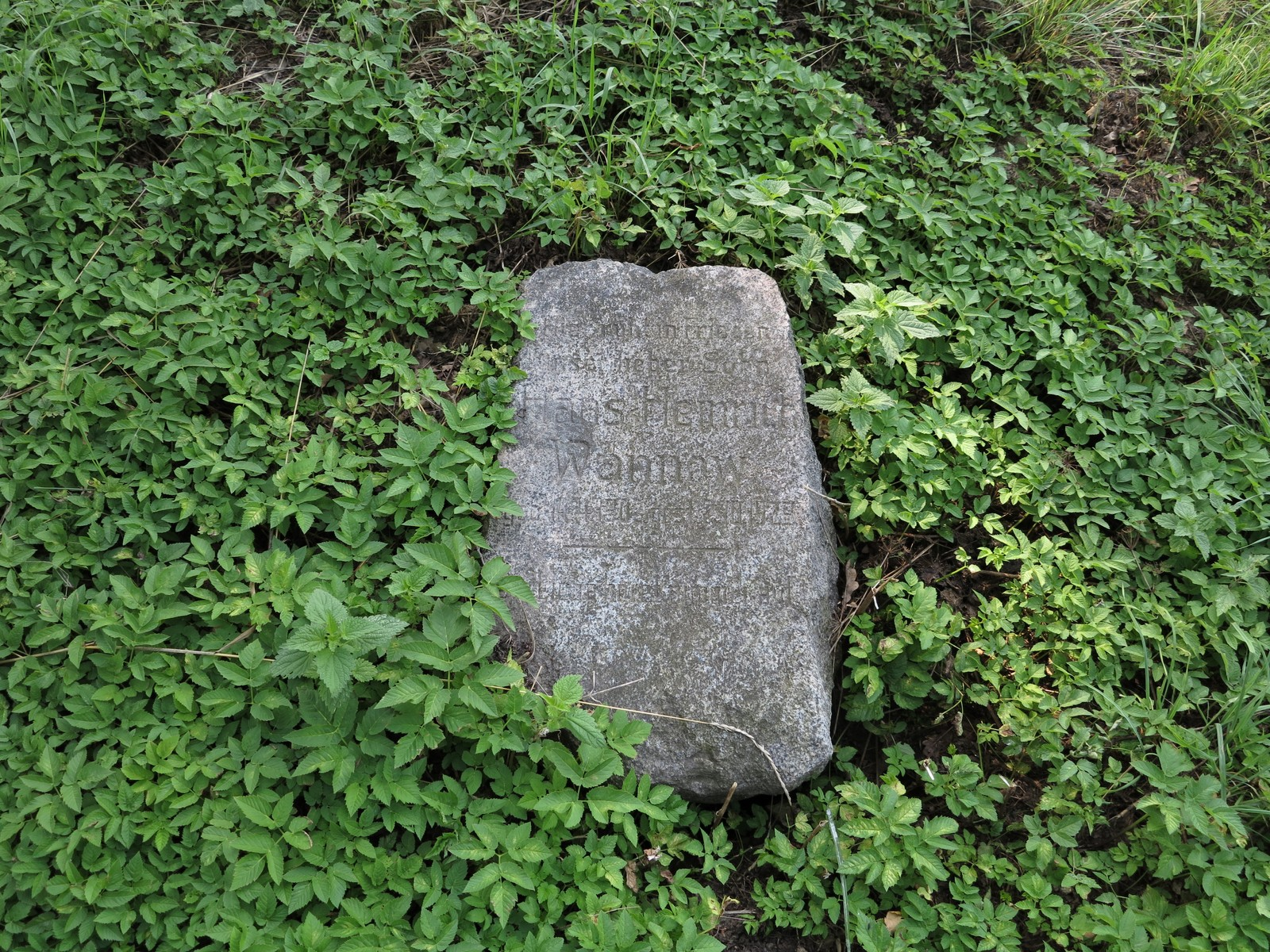

- Location within Poland
- Coordinates: 52°28′6″N 18°55′33″E
- Country: Poland
- Voivodeship: Kuyavian-Pomeranian
- County: Grudziądz
- Gmina: Gruta

Annowo [anˈnɔvɔ] is a village in the administrative district of Gmina Gruta, within Grudziądz County, Kuyavian-Pomeranian Voivodeship, in north-central Poland.
