= Łomianki =

- Town
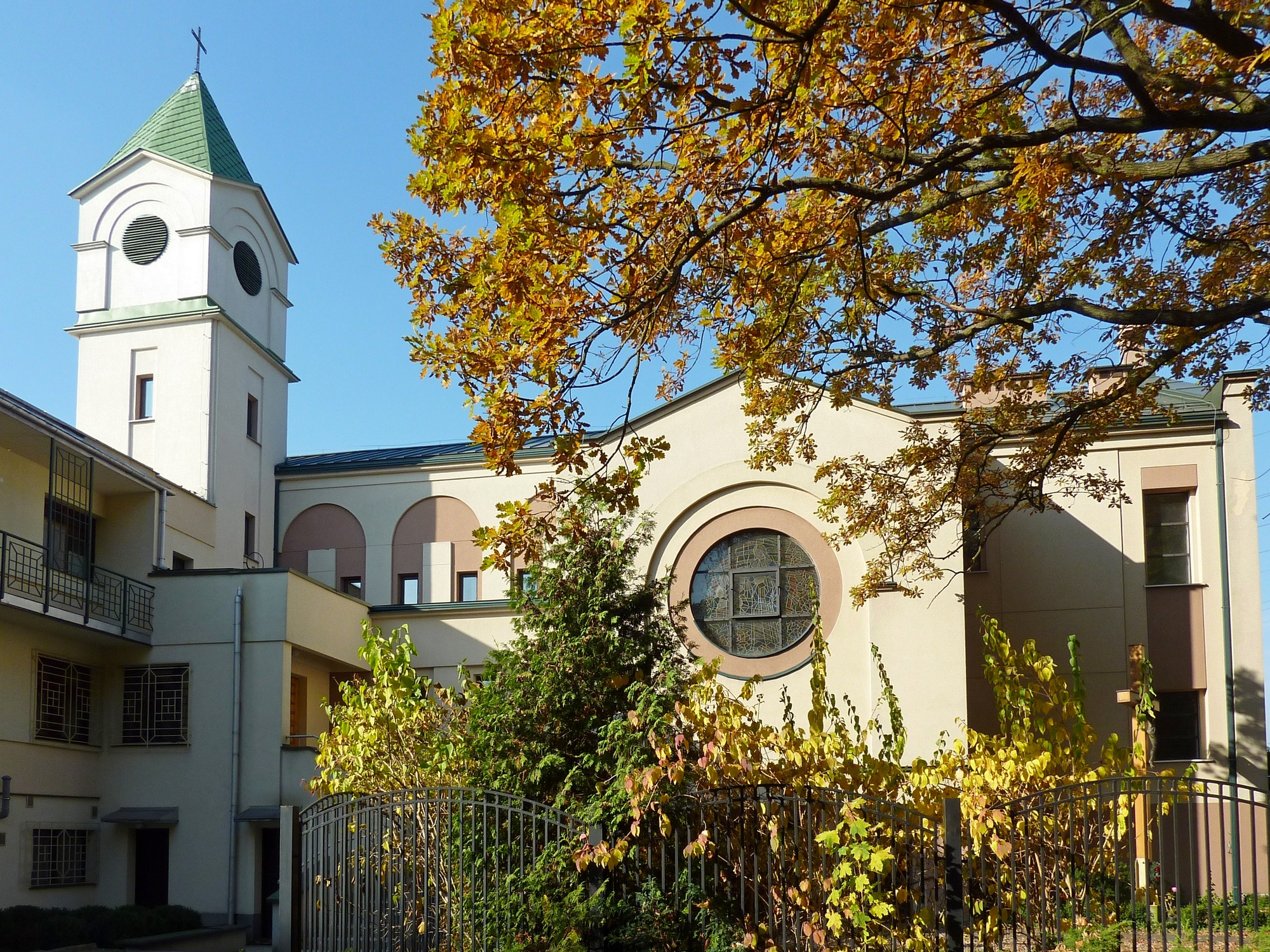
- Blessed Marcelina Darowska church in Łomianki

- Flag Coat of arms

- Location within Poland
- Coordinates: 52°20′N 20°53′E
- Country: Poland
- Voivodeship: Masovian
- County: Warsaw West
- Gmina: Łomianki
- Town rights: 1.1.1989

Government
  - Mayor: Tomasz Dąbrowski

Area
  - Total: 8.4 km^{2} (3.2 sq mi)
- Elevation: 73 m (240 ft)

Population (2020)
  - Total: 24,270
  - Density: 2,900/km^{2} (7,500/sq mi)
- Time zone: UTC+1 (CET)
  - Summer (DST): UTC+2 (CEST)
- Postal code: 05-092
- Area code: +48 22
- Car plates: WZ
- Website: http://www.lomianki.pl/

Łomianki [wɔˈmʲaŋkʲi] is a town in Warsaw West County, Masovian Voivodeship, Poland. It had a population of 16,374 in 2008, and 24,270 in 2020. It is part of the Warsaw metropolitan area.

== History ==
It was the site of the Battle of Łomianki between Polish and German troops, fought on September 22, 1939 during the invasion of Poland.

== Attractions ==
Because the town is located between Kampinos National Park and Vistula river, and just a short distance from the outskirts of Warsaw, it is regarded as a desirable place to live for people who want to combine an outdoor lifestyle while still commuting each day to Warsaw. Kampinos National Park has hundreds of kilometers of cycling trails and the largest inland sand dunes in Europe. Elk and wild boar are often seen there. Łomianki is characterised by big residential houses, particularly around Ulica Zachodnia, and many active community groups. Many expats live in Łomianki, mostly because it is equidistant between the two international airports of the Warsaw metropolitan area, Chopin and Modlin.

Of interest in Łomianki are the Jazz Cafe where live music from all over Poland and beyond is a regular feature, Manufaktura Czekolady which is the only place in Poland where chocolate is made from bean to bar, and the Lemon Tree Pub where most community events are hosted. There are two Italian restaurants, both run by Italians, as well as a gourmet burger bar, a sushi restaurant.

== Twin towns and sister cities ==
- Noyelles-lès-Vermelles, France
- (United States) Columbia Heights, Minnesota, USA

== Sport ==
- KS Łomianki, football

== Gallery ==
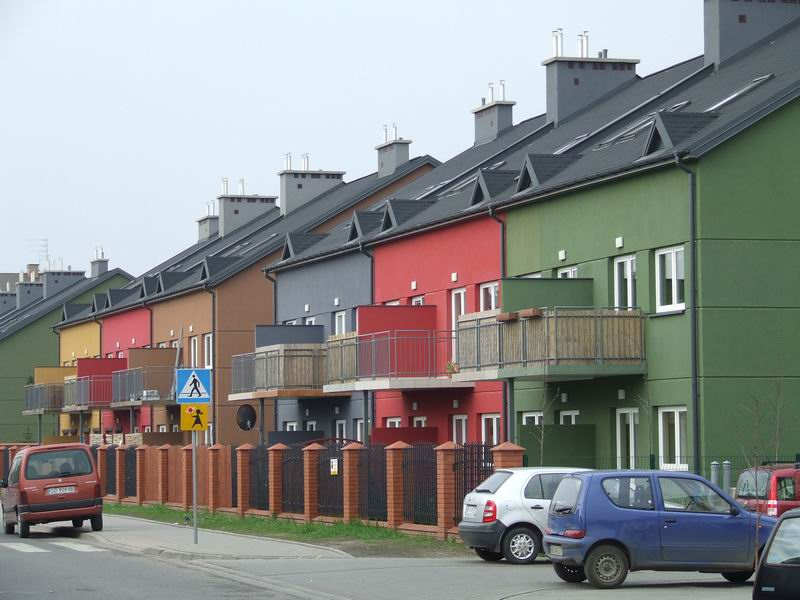
Houses in the Łomianki Górne district

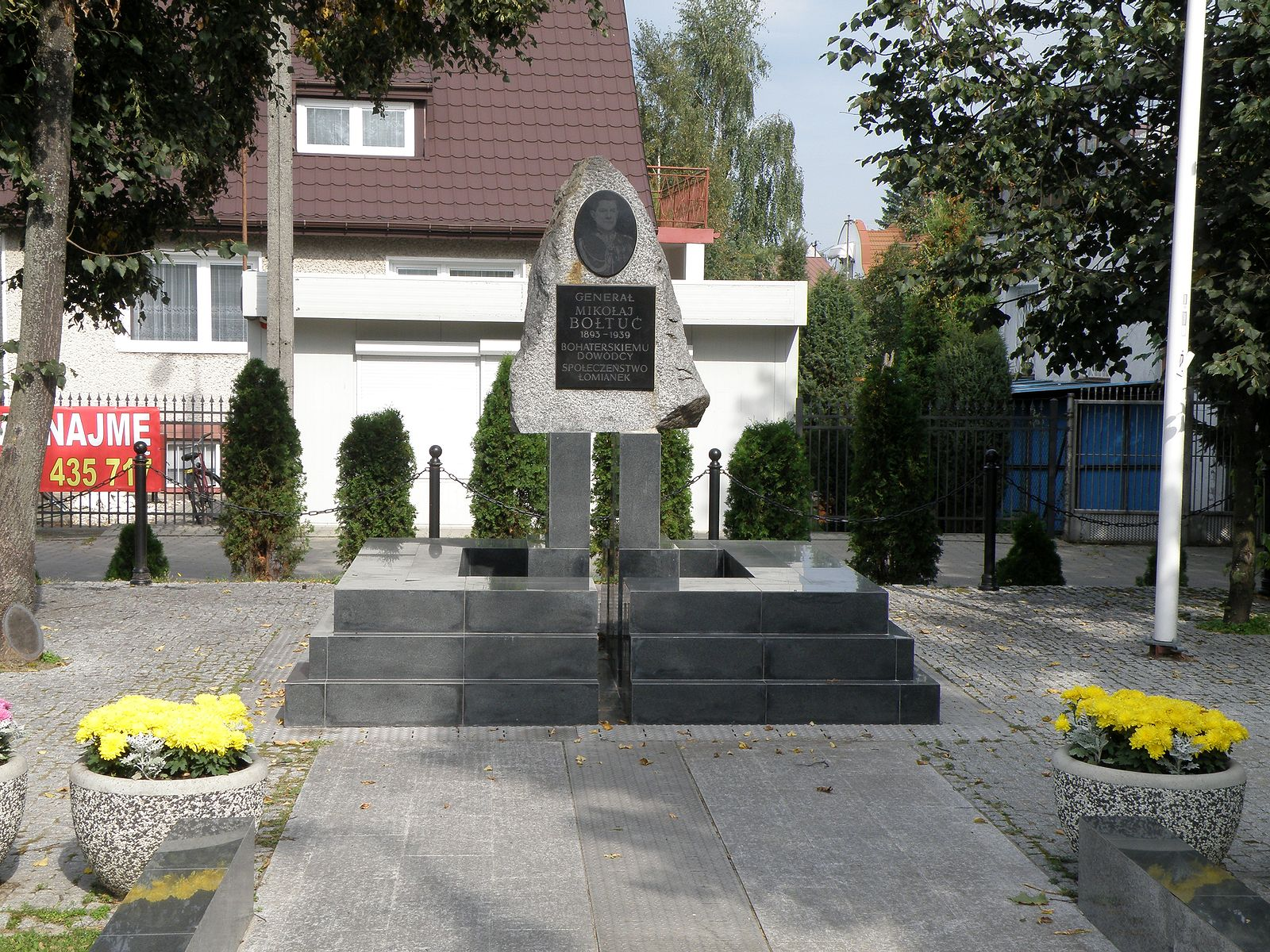
Monument to General Mikołaj Bołtuć

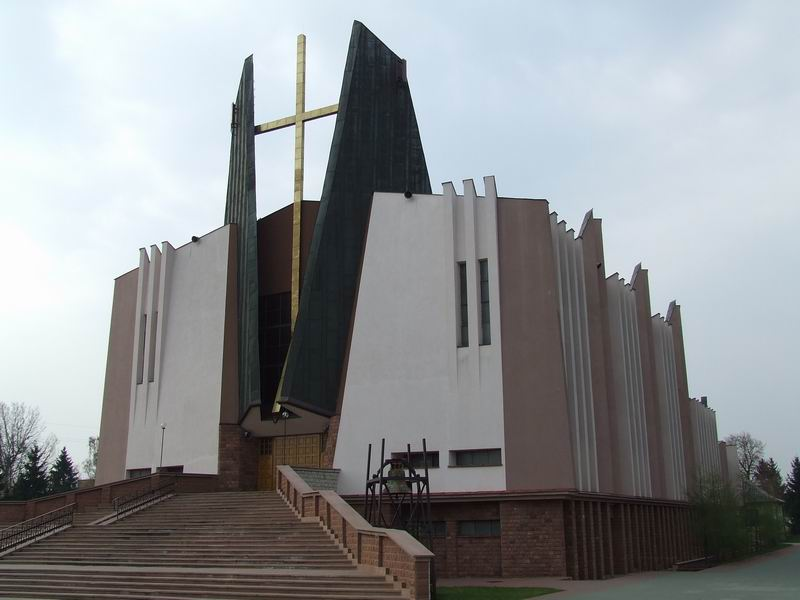
Parish church of Margaret the Virgin

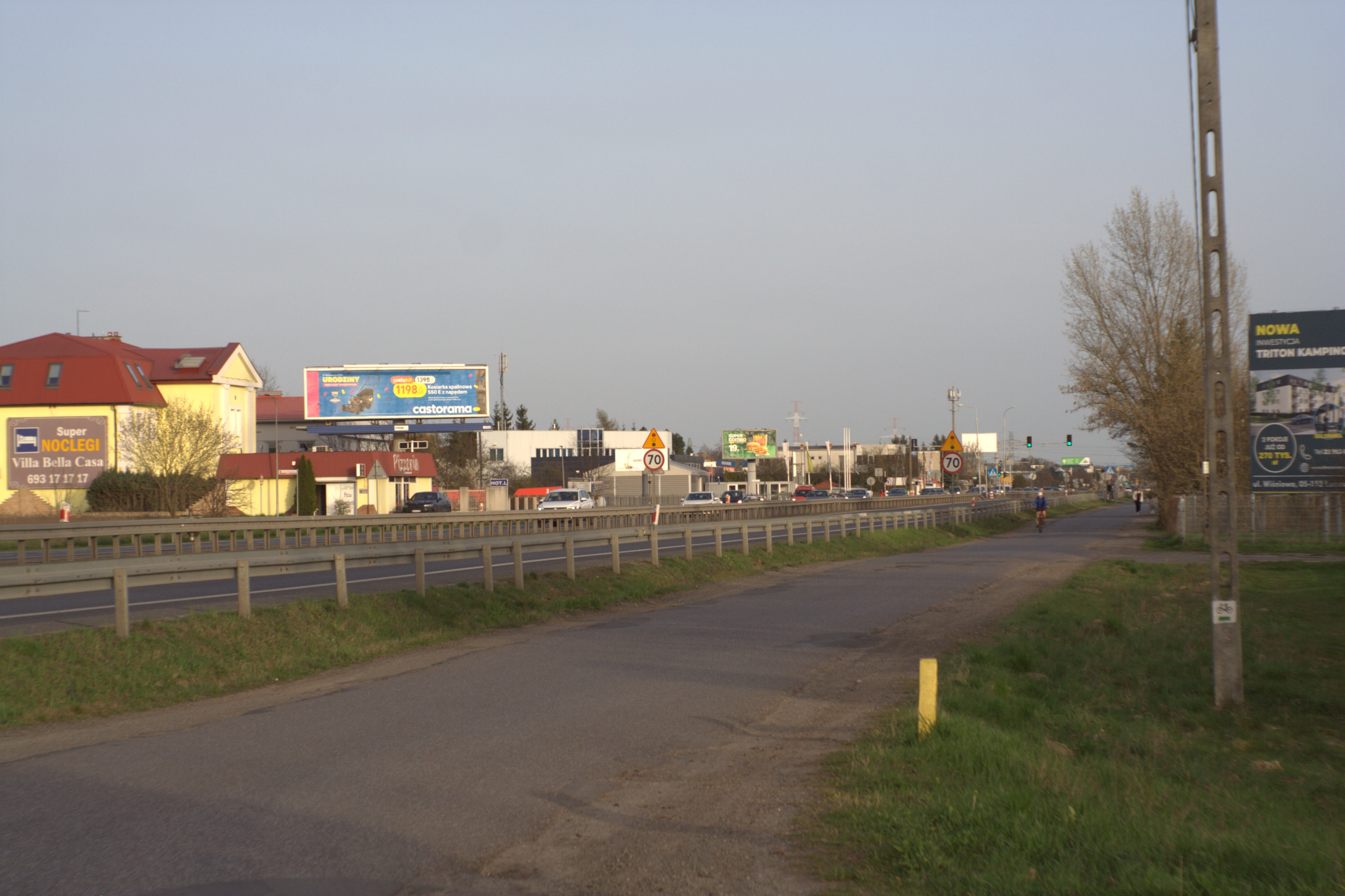
Highway 7 "Trasa Gdańska" looking out over Łomianki Górne district
