= Mikołaj Bołtuć =

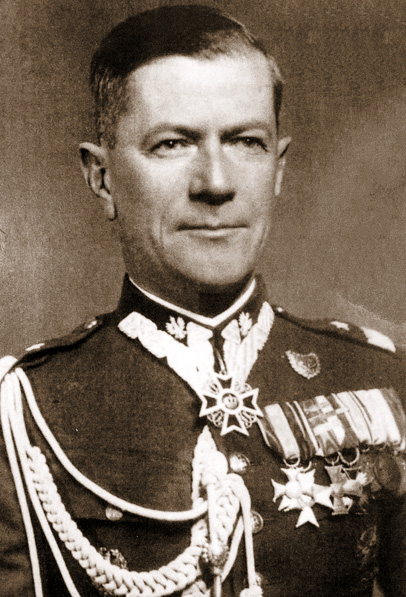
- Born: 21 December 1893; Saint Petersburg
- Died: 22 September 1939 (aged 45); Łomianki
- Burial place: Powązki Military Cemetery
- Military career
- Allegiance: Second Polish Republic
- Branch: Russian Imperial Army Polish Armed Forces
- Rank: Brigadier General
- Commands: IV Polish infantry Division
- Conflicts: Second World War; Battle of Łomianki; Battle of Tuchola Forest
- Awards: Virtuti Militari; Polonia Restituta; Cross of Valour; Cross of Merit; Medal for Long Service; Order of the Crown of Romania; 1914–1918 Inter-Allied Victory medal

Mikołaj Bołtuć (21 December 1893 in Saint Petersburg – 22 September 1939 near Łomianki) was a brigadier-general of the Polish Army, commander of the IV Polish infantry Division during World War II.

== Early life ==
He was the son of Ignacy Bołtuć, General in the Russian Imperial Army of Polish noble descent, and his wife, Anna Łabuńska, of Rzeczyca. (Note: There are numerous places called Rzeczyca – in several countries; see the disambiguation page in Polish Wikipedia, pl:Rzeczyca, for a more extensive list. It is unclear which one was the seat of the Łabuński family. One source says that the family was based in Polish Inflanty. That article in Polish Wikipedia associates Polish Livonia with Latgale, a historical and cultural region of Latvia which includes Rēzekne (Polish: Rzeżyca); yet another possibility.)

== Career ==
Bołtuć was enlisted in the Russian Cadet officers school in Omsk when he was seven.

During World War I, Bołtuć served in the Imperial Russian Army, rising to the rank of captain and distinguishing himself as an officer of the 12th Finnish Rifle Regiment on the Eastern Front. After the Bolshevik Revolution, he joined the Polish III Corps in Russia in December 1917, and in 1918 continued his service in the 4th Polish Rifle Division commanded by General Lucjan Żeligowski. Together with this formation, he took part in the evacuation from the Odessa region before joining the newly organized Polish Army.

Upon returning to Poland he commanded units near Kamieniec, Podolski and elsewhere. During the Soviet-Polish war of 1920, he commanded the unit Strzelcy Kaniowscy. Bołtuć, still a captain, commanded the defence of Zamość. Then he took Wyszków, the location of the puppet government organized by the Bolsheviks.

During the interwar period, he worked for the General Command and later held command functions in Wilno and Toruń. His nomination to the rank of general was held back for several years, in part because of his anti-religious attitude and his reservations about Poland's military spending patterns. He was known for clarity of judgment and leadership skills.

During World War II, he commanded an Operation Group, a unit short of an army, within the Army Pomorze, the only Polish unit that entered German territory (in East Prussia) for two days during the September Campaign and withstood attacks of much larger German forces. The danger of being flanked forced Boltuc to withdraw to Modlin. When the Modlin Fortress could accept only his officers but not his soldiers, he let his soldiers be demobilised, but most refused to leave. He also encouraged volunteers to go with him to try to sneak through the German Siege of Warsaw. According to written family records, he said while he was leaving home before the war, "This is not the war we are going to win and I am not the kind of a soldier who would surrender".

On the morning of 22 September, he was killed at the Battle of Łomianki from sniper fire while he was leading the charge.

Most of his soldiers were buried at the Łomianki cemetery, near Warsaw. Boltuc's tomb, in a form of a field stone, is at the Powązki Military Cemetery, in Warsaw.

== Promotions ==
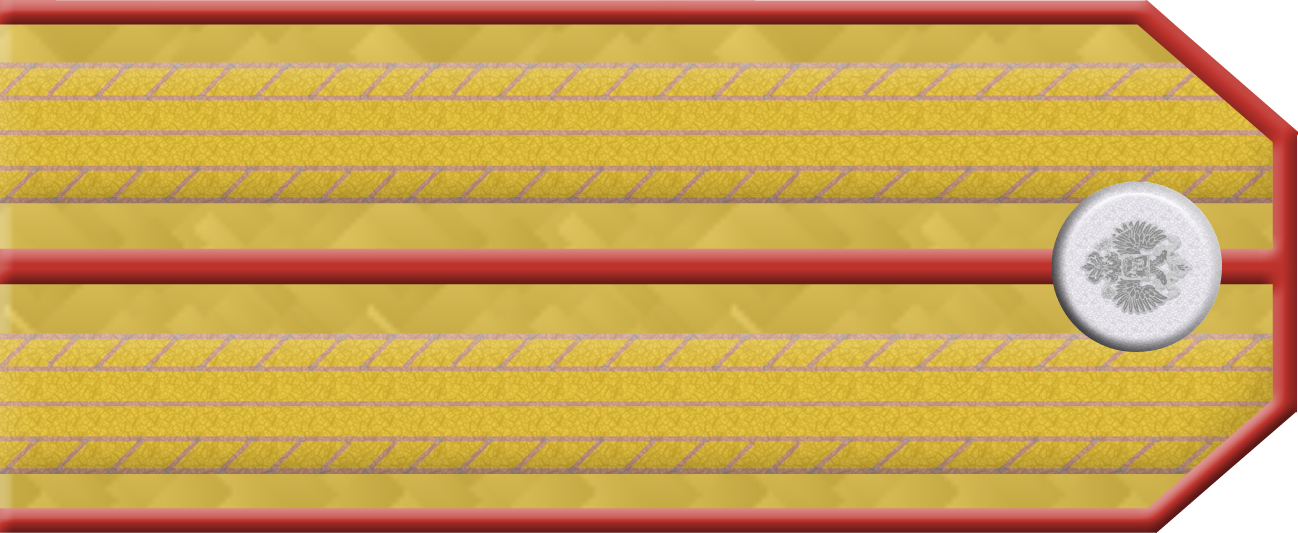
- Kapitan (Captain) - 1917
- Major (Major) - 1919
- Podpułkownik (Lieutenant colonel) - 31 March 1924
- Pułkownik (Colonel) - 1 January 1928
- Generał brygady (Brigadier general) - 19 March 1939

== Awards and decorations ==
- Golden Cross of Virtuti Militari (posthumously)
- Silver Cross of Virtuti Militari (1921)
- Commander's Cross of Order of Polonia Restituta
- Officer's Cross of Order of Polonia Restituta (27 November 1929)
- Cross of Valour (four times, last in 1922)
- Golden Cross of Merit ( 19 March 1937, 10 November 1938)
- Commemorative Medal of War 1918-1921
- Medal of 10th Anniversary of Regained Independence
- Silver Medal for Long Service
- Bronze Medal for Long Service
- Commander's Cross of Order of the Star of Romania (Romania)
- 1914–1918 Inter-Allied Victory medal

== Sources ==
Monograph: Generał Mikołaj Bołtuć Wizerunek Żołnierza author: Bohdan Królikowski Nakładem Stawarzyszenia Katolików Wojskowych ISBN 83-906281-1-2, Warszawa/Warsaw 1998.
