= Ferdynand Zarzycki =

Polish general and politician

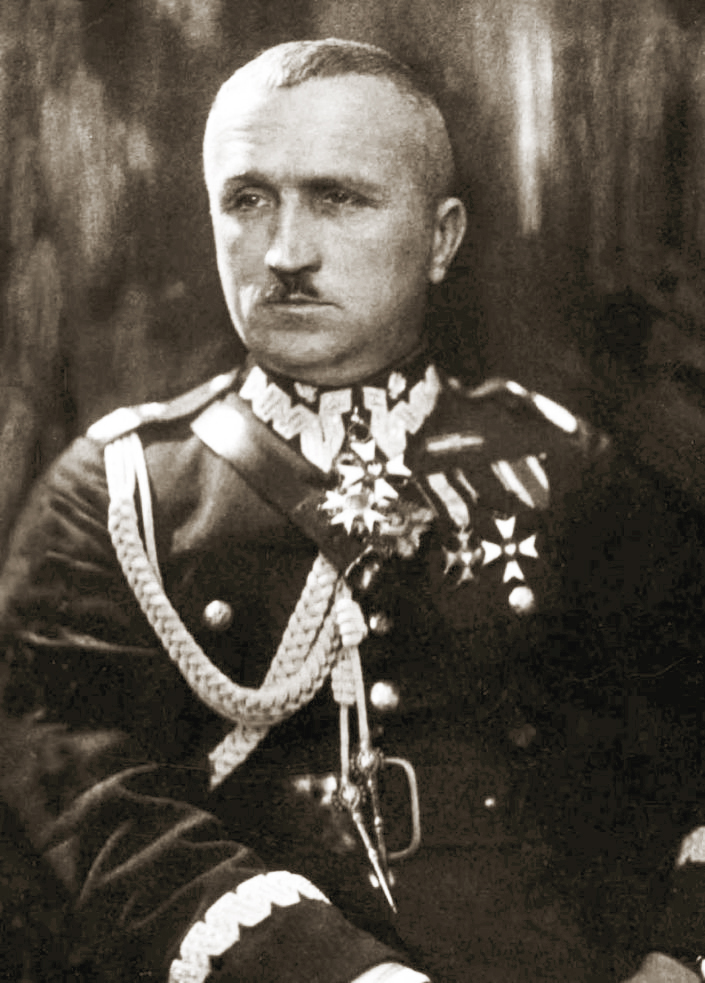
Ferdynand Zarzycki

Ferdynand Zarzycki (22 December 1888, in Tarnów – 10 October 1958, in Chicago, Illinois) was a Polish general and politician. He fought in the Polish Legions in World War I. From 1933 to 1934, he was a Minister of Trade and Industry in the Polish government. He retired in 1934. He was also a senator from 1935 until 1939.
