= Dąbrówka Królewska =

- Village
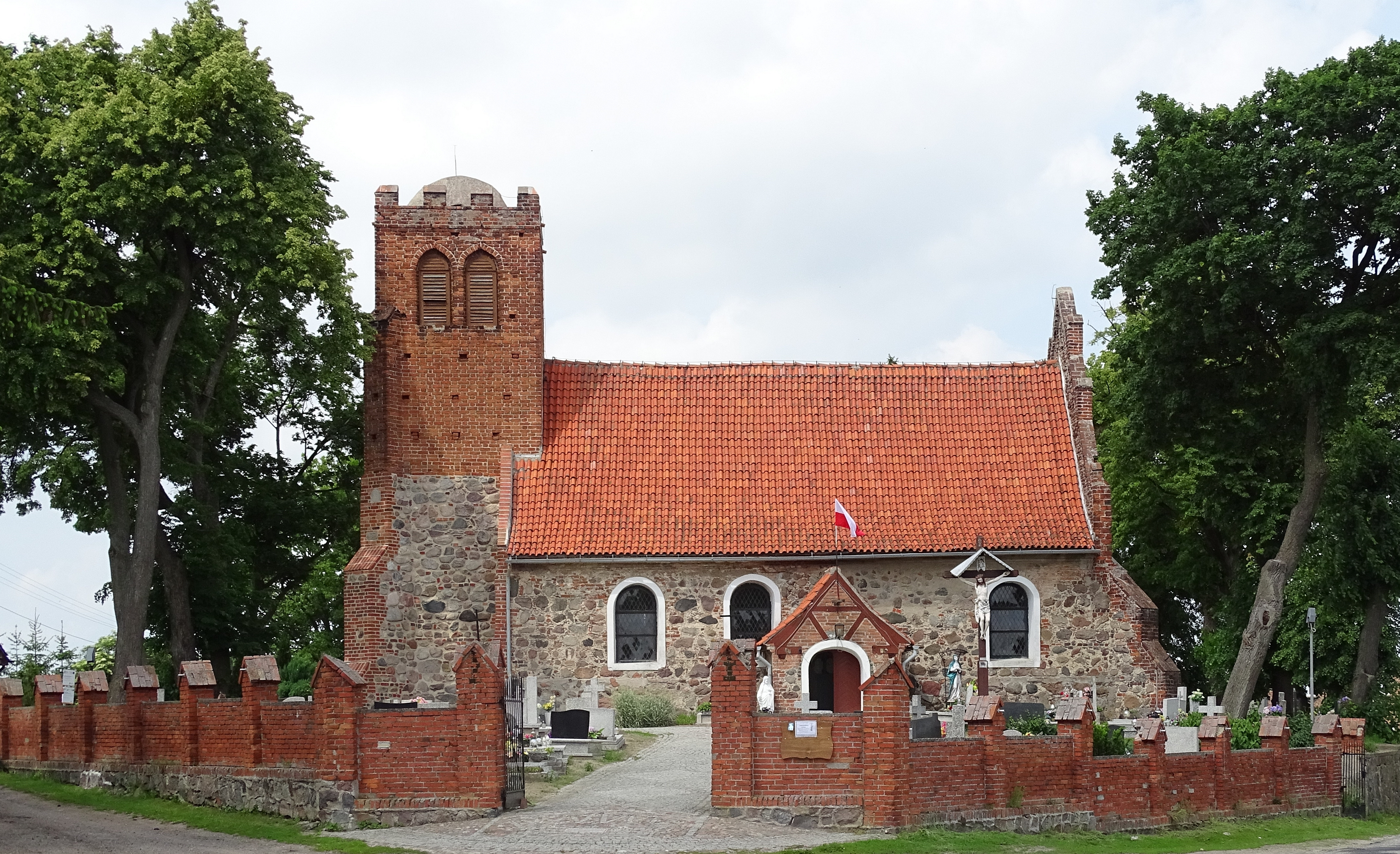
- Saint James church in Dąbrówka Królewska

- Location within Poland
- Coordinates: 53°30′N 18°56′E
- Country: Poland
- Voivodeship: Kuyavian-Pomeranian
- County: Grudziądz
- Gmina: Gruta
- Population: 700
- Time zone: UTC+1 (CET)
  - Summer (DST): UTC+2 (CEST)
- Vehicle registration: CGR

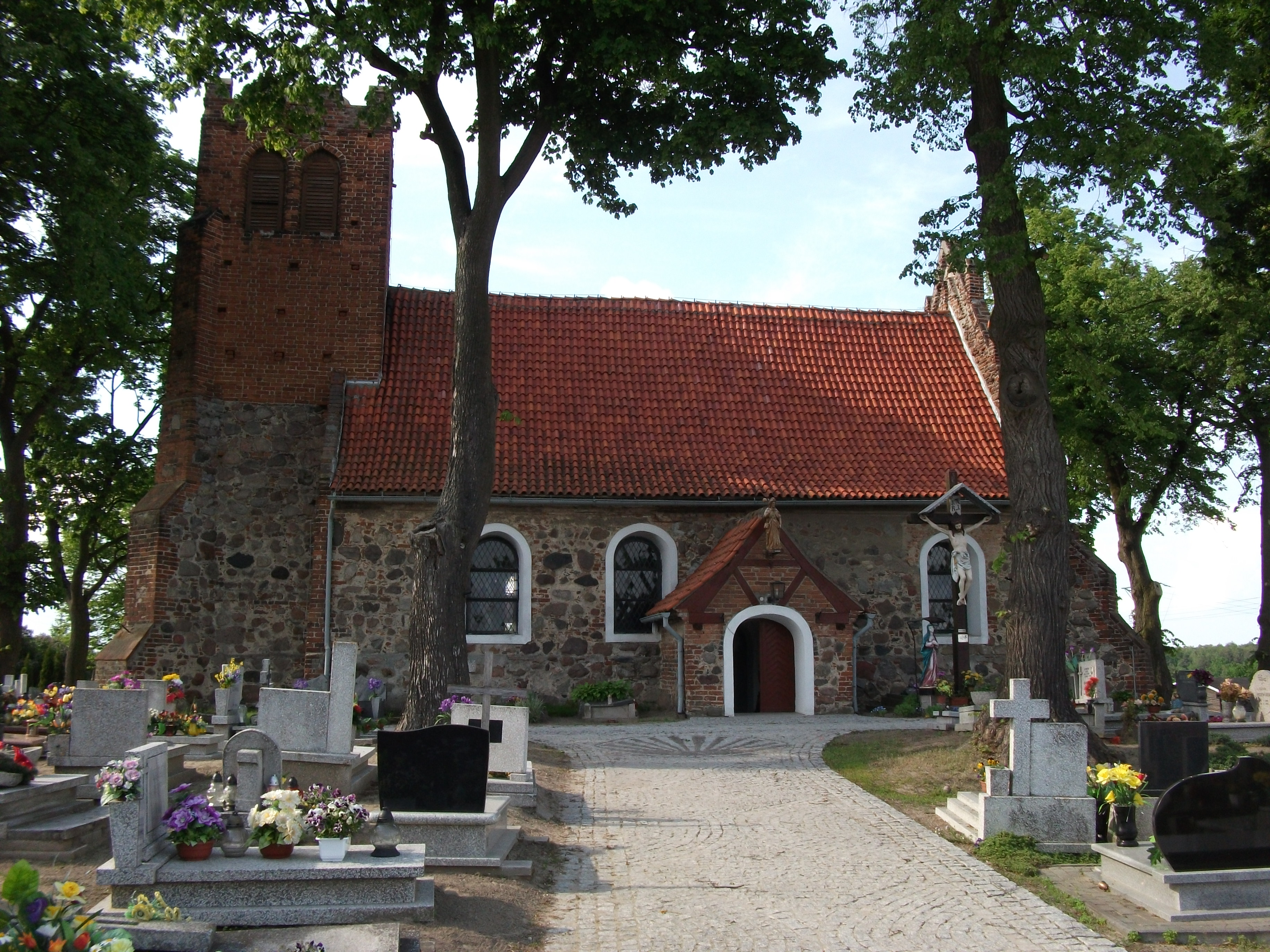
The church along with the surrounding cemetery

Dąbrówka Królewska [dɔmˈbrufka kruˈlɛfska] is a village in the administrative district of Gmina Gruta, within Grudziądz County, Kuyavian-Pomeranian Voivodeship, in north-central Poland. It is located in the Chełmno Land in the historic region of Pomerania.

== History ==
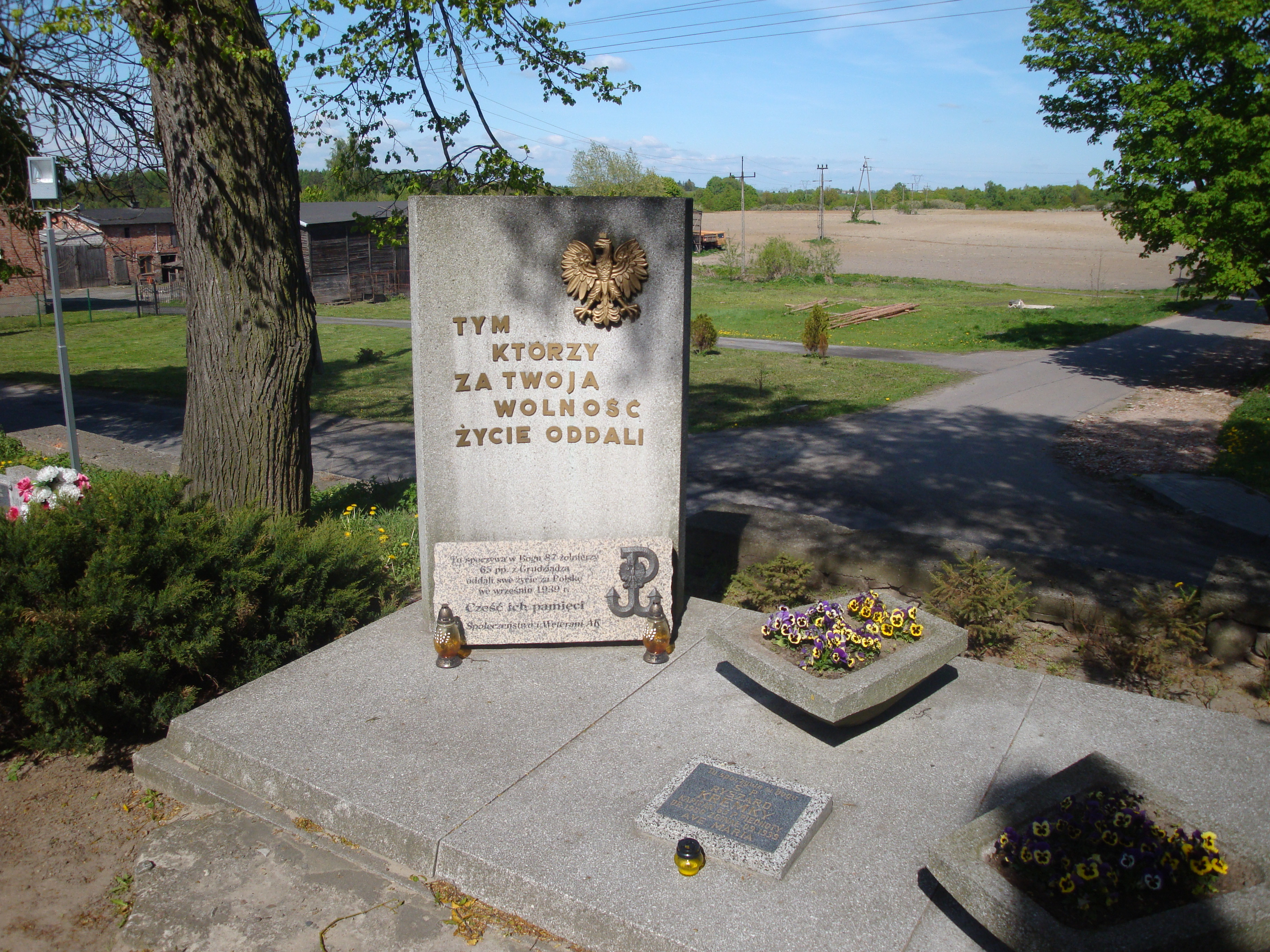
Grave of 87 Polish soldiers fallen during the German invasion of Poland in 1939

During the German occupation (World War II), Dąbrówka Królewska was one of the sites of executions of Poles carried out by the Germans in 1939 as part of the Intelligenzaktion. Farmers from Dąbrówka Królewska were also murdered by the German SS and Selbstschutz in the large massacre of Poles committed in 1939 in nearby Białochowo, also as part of the Intelligenzaktion.
