= Nicwałd =

- Village
- Location within Poland
- Coordinates: 53°28′N 18°54′E
- Country: Poland
- Voivodeship: Kuyavian-Pomeranian
- County: Grudziądz
- Gmina: Gruta
- Population: 459

Nicwałd [ˈnit͡sfau̯t] is a village in the administrative district of Gmina Gruta, within Grudziądz County, Kuyavian-Pomeranian Voivodeship, in north-central Poland.
