= Rečica =

Rečica may refer to:

Bosnia and Herzegovina

- Rečica, Bosnia and Herzegovnina, Novi Grad Municipality, Sarajevo
- Rečica (Han Pijesak), a village in the Republika Srpska

Croatia

- Rečica, Croatia, a village east of Karlovac
- Rečica Kriška

Italy

- Fiumicello, or Rečica in Slovene commune

North Macedonia

- Rečica, Kumanovo, Kumanovo Municipality
- Golema Rečica, Tetovo Municipality

Serbia

- Rečica, Bojnik
- Rečica (Kladovo), a village in the municipality of Kladovo
- Rečica, Požarevac
- Rečica (Žitorađa), a village in the municipality of Žitorađa

Slovenia

- Rečica, Bled, a former settlement in the Municipality of Bled
- Rečica, Ilirska Bistrica, a settlement next to Ilirska Bistrica
- Rečica ob Paki
- Rečica ob Savinji, a municipality in the Lower Styria region
