= Rzeczyca, Otwock County =

Rzeczyca
- Settlement
- Country: Poland
- Voivodeship: Masovian
- County: Otwock
- Gmina: Sobienie-Jeziory

Rzeczyca [ʐɛˈt͡ʂɨt͡sa] is a settlement in the administrative district of Gmina Sobienie-Jeziory, within Otwock County, Masovian Voivodeship, in east-central Poland.
