= Gruta =

- Village
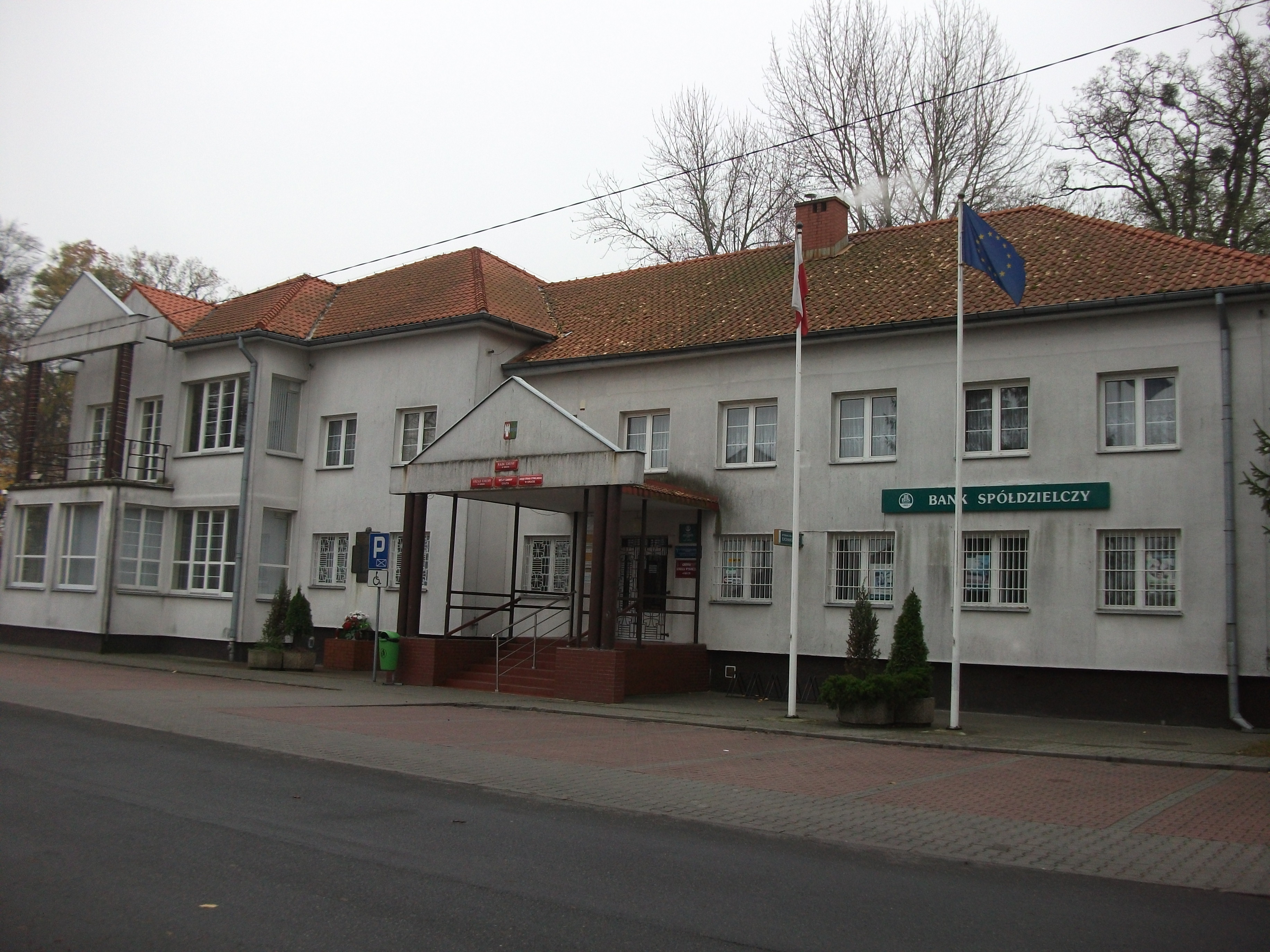
- Town hall of Gruta

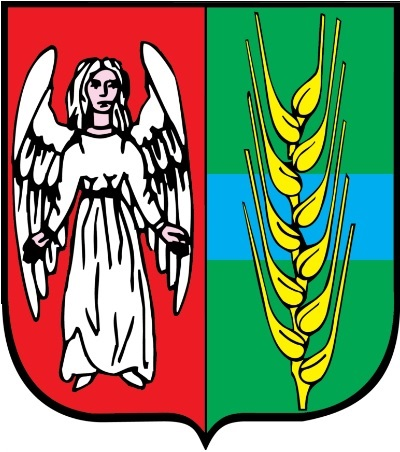
- Coat of arms

- Location within Poland
- Coordinates: 53°27′9″N 18°57′24″E
- Country: Poland
- Voivodeship: Kuyavian-Pomeranian
- County: Grudziądz
- Gmina: Gruta
- Area: 123.8 km^{2} (47.8 sq mi)
- Population (2006): 1,600
  - Density: 13/km^{2} (33/sq mi)
- Postal Code: 86-022
- Area code: (+48) 56
- Vehicle registration: CGR
- Climate: Dfb

Gruta [ˈɡruta] is a village in Grudziądz County, Kuyavian-Pomeranian Voivodeship, in north-central Poland. It is the seat of the gmina (administrative district) called Gmina Gruta.

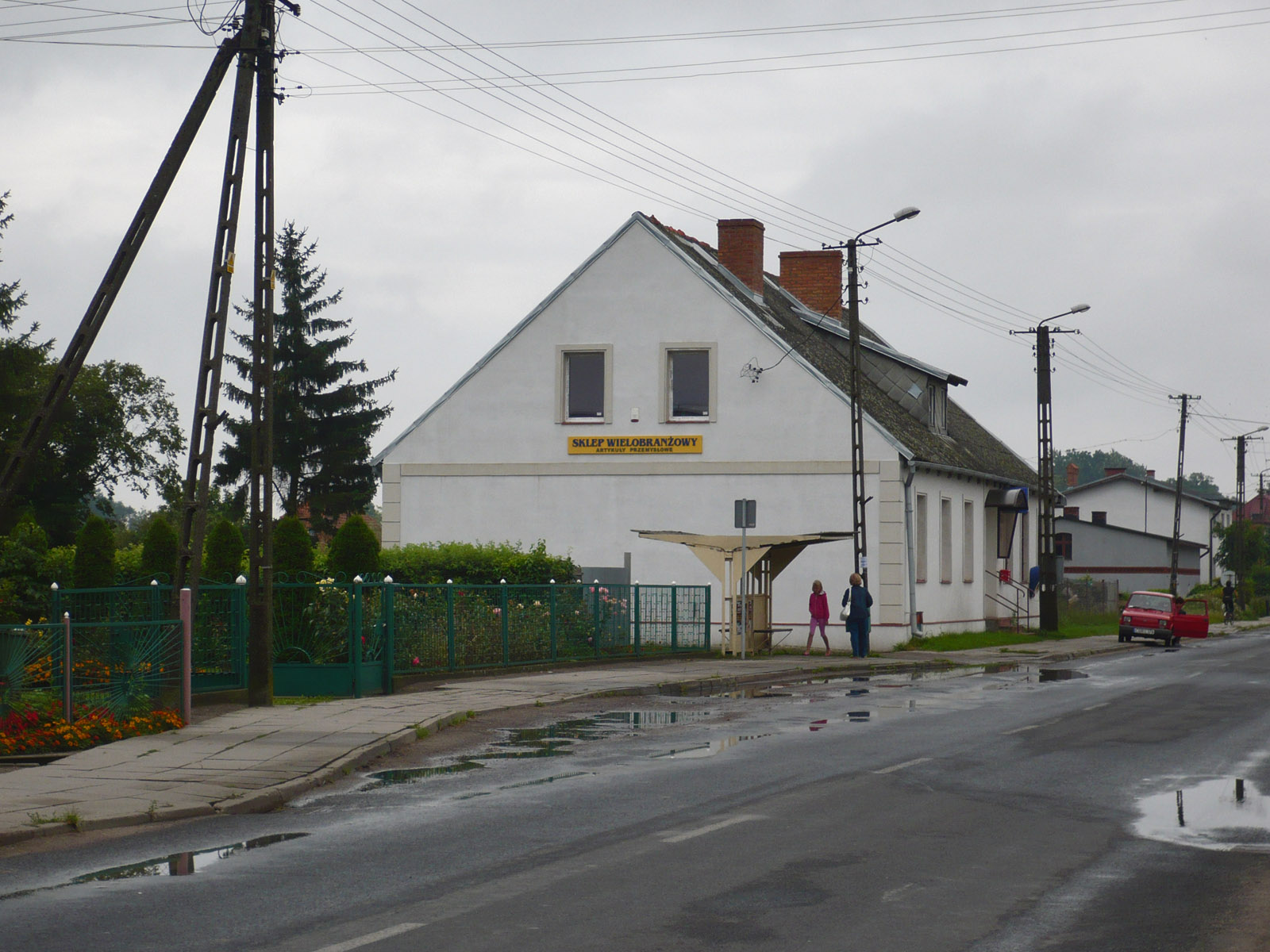
Polish Post in Gruta

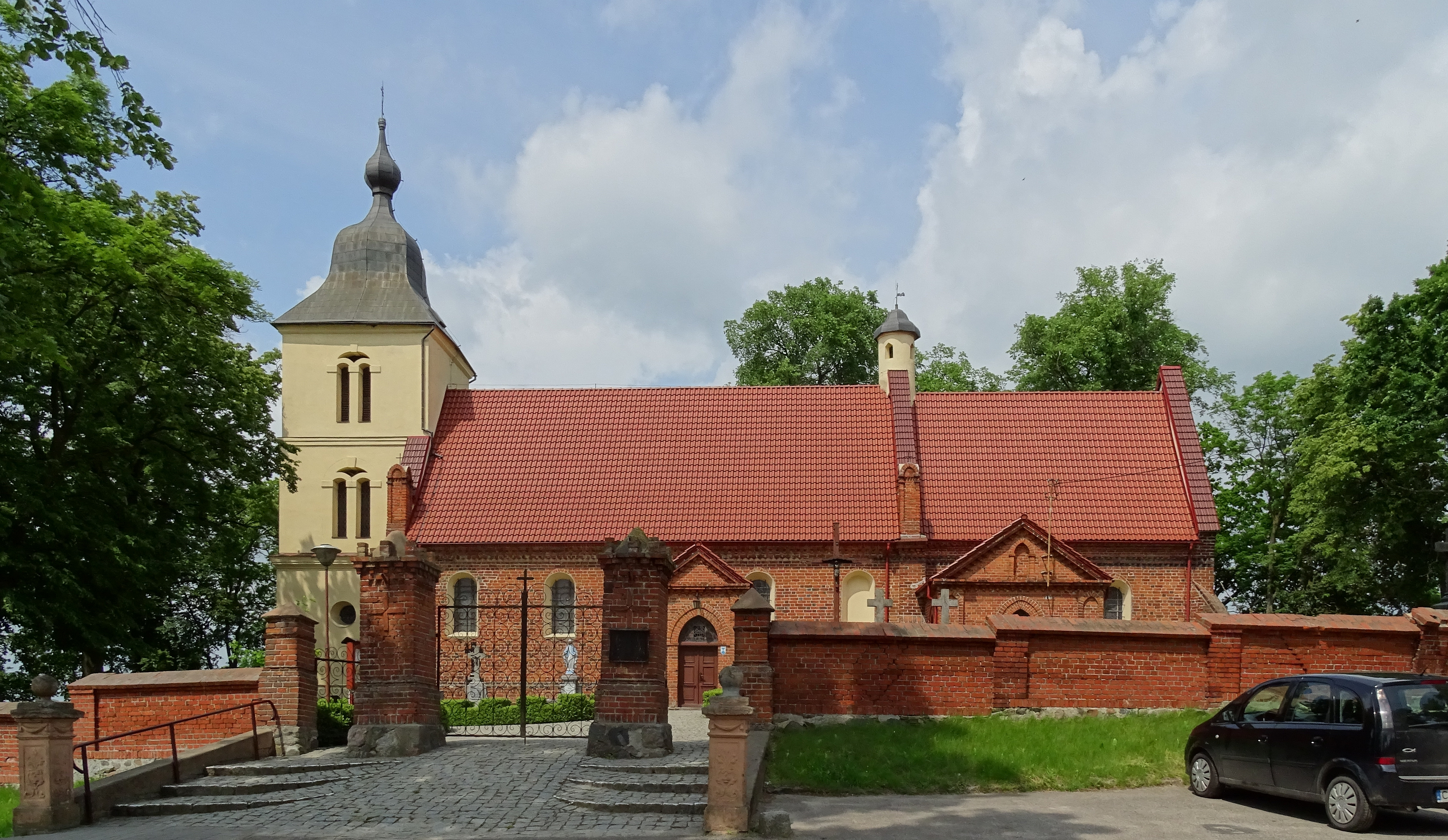
Church of the Assumption of the Virgin Mary from the 14th century.
