= 39th Infantry Regiment (Poland) =

Polish infantry unit of the Polish Armed Forces

39th Lviv Rifle Regiment
- 39 Pułk Piechoty Strzelców Lwowskich
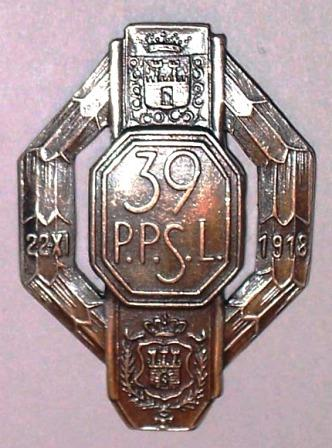
- Soldier's badge of the 39th Lviv Rifle Regiment
- Active: November 25, 1918–September 20, 1939
- Country: Poland
- Allegiance: 24th Infantry Division
- Garrison/HQ: Jarosław, Lubaczów
- Anniversaries: April 29
- Engagements: Polish–Ukrainian War; Polish–Soviet War; Invasion of Poland

Commanders
- First commander: Lieutenant Colonel Ryszard Hausner
- Last commander: Lieutenant Colonel Roman Szymański

39th Lviv Rifle Regiment was a Polish infantry unit of the Polish Armed Forces. It was formed from the defenders of Lviv in November 1918.

The regiment participated in the fights for the borders in 1919 and in the Polish–Soviet War of 1920. During the interwar period, it was part of the 24th Infantry Division. It was stationed in the Jarosław garrison, with the 1st Battalion located in Lubaczów.

In the September Campaign, it followed a combat route starting from Wojnicz, fighting in Zgłobice, Zbylitowska Góra, Jawornik Ruski, Boguszówka, Boratycze, Husaków, Mużyłowice Kolonia, Rzęsna Ruska, and Holosko, eventually breaking through to the besieged Lviv, where it was severely depleted on 20 September 1939.

== Formation and organizational changes ==
The 39th Lviv Rifle Regiment was formed from units defending Lviv against Ukrainian forces, who, on 1 November 1918, after the collapse of Austria-Hungary, seized Eastern Lesser Poland, including Lviv. Spontaneously, Polish combat groups began to form and fight in the city. Street battles lasted for three weeks. On 20 November 1918, reinforcements arrived, including the 4th and 5th Legions' Infantry Regiments. By 22 November, Lviv was recaptured by the Poles.

On 25 November 1918, three Lviv infantry regiments were organized. One of these was the 2nd Lviv Rifle Regiment, formed by the Lviv Command from various units. The First Battalion was composed of personnel from the Podzamcze–Rzęsna Polska sector, while the Second Battalion was formed from defenders of the main railway station. On 20 December, the 3rd Lviv Rifle Regiment was integrated into the unit as the Third Battalion.

On 25 January 1919, the regiment's reserve battalion was relocated to Jarosław.

By the General Staff Order No. 98 of 8 March 1919, the unit was renamed the 39th Infantry Regiment.

On 4 April 1919, the Minister of Military Affairs, Lieutenant General Józef Leśniewski, awarded the regiment the honorary name "Lviv Rifle Regiment".

In December 1919, the regiment's reserve battalion was stationed in Jarosław.

=== Personnel of the regiment in 1920 ===
Position	Rank, name
Regiment Commander	Lieutenant Colonel Stanisław Sobolewski (until 15 June)
Regiment Commander	Lieutenant Colonel Franciszek Goliński
Regiment Commander	Major Bolesław Pytel (from 27 August)
Adjutant	Second Lieutenant Stanisław Luziński
Doctor	Lieutenant Herman Bryzman
Chaplain	Father Jan Łętek
Weapons and Gas Officer	Second Lieutenant Eustachy Kamieński
Telephone Platoon Commander	Second Lieutenant Adam Szefer
Commander of the First Battalion	Captain Stanisław Szyłejko (until 15 July)
Commander of the First Battalion	Major Zbigniew Michalewski (wounded 9 September)
Commander of the First Battalion	Lieutenant Mieczysław Zieliński
Commander of the First Battalion	Major Antoni Lisowski (from 21 September)
Adjutant	Second Lieutenant Władysław Heller
Provisions Officer	Second Lieutenant Stanisław Kargol
Doctor	Second Lieutenant Emil Skulski
Doctor	Second Lieutenant Józef Zeiger
Commander of the 1st Company	Lieutenant Stefan Sozański
Commander of the 2nd Company	Second Lieutenant Władysław Odlanicki
Commander of the 3rd Company	Second Lieutenant Tytus Rotter
Commander of the 4th Company	Second Lieutenant Emil Kikiniss
Commander of the 1st MG Company	Second Lieutenant Stanisław Stańkowski
Commander of the Second Battalion	Captain Edmund Jaworski (April–1 September)
Commander of the Second Battalion	Lieutenant Jan Janiszewski (September)
Commander of the Second Battalion	Major Józef Nawrocki (from 17 September)
Doctor	Second Lieutenant Jerzy Dziopiński
Provisions Officer	Lieutenant Tadeusz Stawski
Cashier	Second Lieutenant Edward Łoziński
Commander of the 5th Company	Second Lieutenant Aleksander Połubak
Commander of the 6th Company	Second Lieutenant Mikołaj Pasiuk
Commander of the 7th Company	Second Lieutenant Bolesław Szczucki
Commander of the 8th Company	Second Lieutenant Adolf Wielkiewicz
Commander of the 2nd MG Company	Second Lieutenant Bogusław Matousz
Commander of the Third Battalion	Captain Ferdynand Andrusiewicz (May)
Commander of the Third Battalion	Lieutenant Władysław Sawicki
Adjutant	Second Lieutenant Franciszek Górski
Doctor	Second Lieutenant Juliusz Ziegler
Doctor	Second Lieutenant Józef Mokrzycki
Provisions Officer	Second Lieutenant Mieszko Kretowicz
Cashier	Lieutenant Stanisław Smereka
Commander of the 9th Company	Second Lieutenant Feliks Serbeński
Commander of the 10th Company	Second Lieutenant Kazimierz Lipert
Commander of the 11th Company	Second Lieutenant Bożymir Stała
Commander of the 12th Company	Lieutenant Wacław Kruszewski († 31 August)
Commander of the 3rd MG Company	N.N.
Battalion Officer	Second Lieutenant Stefan Nyczay
Commander of the Technical Company	Lieutenant Karol Marks
Platoon Commander	Second Lieutenant Józef Huppenthal
Regimental Officer	Lieutenant Eugeniusz Okołowicz
Regimental Officer	Lieutenant Wincenty Szlakiewicz (wounded 9 September)
Regimental Officer	Second Lieutenant Marian Horak († 31 August)
Regimental Officer	Second Lieutenant Mateusz Kopeć (wounded 9 September)
Regimental Officer	Second Lieutenant Tadeusz Podowski († 31 August)
Regimental Officer	Second Lieutenant Ludwik Rotter
Regimental Officer	Second Lieutenant Edmund Sawiński
Regimental Officer	Cadet Bartłomiej Józef Dobosz

== In the Polish–Soviet War ==
In February 1920, the regiment captured Nowokonstantynów after four days of fighting. On 14 April 1920, along with the 38th Infantry Regiment, it advanced on Vovkovyntsi, where several Soviet infantry and cavalry regiments were defeated. On 13 April, General Władysław Jędrzejewski decided to organize another raid on Vovkovyntsi with the task of breaking enemy forces, cutting the railway line near Vovkovyntsi, and partially destroying the railway station. This time, a much larger force was used. The assault force included seven companies from the 38th Infantry Regiment, five companies from the 19th Infantry Regiment, the entire 39th Infantry Regiment, the III/4th Cavalry Regiment, a platoon from the 3rd Battery of the 12th Field Artillery Regiment, and the armored trains Pionier and Gen. Iwaszkiewicz. During the night from 13 to 14 April, the group began its march to Vovkovyntsi and struck at dawn. The surprised enemy put up little resistance and retreated in disorder. The enemy's swift retreat resulted in the capture of only about 150 prisoners, but the regiment seized four guns, 26 machine guns, the office of the 399th Rifle Regiment, and large supplies of ammunition and food.

On 4 July 1920, the forces of the Western Front, led by Mikhail Tukhachevsky, launched an attack. The 39th Infantry Regiment, as part of the 9th Infantry Brigade of General Władysław Jędrzejewski's group, defended positions along the Avuta river on the left wing of the brigade. In the first hours of the enemy's offensive, a crisis developed on the Polish defensive line. The 39th Infantry Regiment was pushed back to the second line of trenches. Fighting Soviet forces from the 4th Rifle Division and a combined cavalry brigade, its positions changed hands multiple times. The regiment lost approximately 50% of its rank-and-file soldiers and 40% of its officers. In the evening, the regiment retreated behind the Mniuta river and began defending the Zadoroże bridgehead. On 5 July, the enemy broke through the Polish front both to the north and south of the bridgehead, with cavalry threatening to outflank the defending units. At 2:00 PM, the regiment received orders to abandon the bridgehead. Only one battalion could be formed from the surviving soldiers, under the command of Captain Stanisław Szyłejka. In the evening, the combined battalion took positions near Zaborze on both sides of the road from Zadoroże to Hlybokaye. However, Soviet cavalry performed deep flanking maneuvers, preventing the maintenance of defensive positions. During the retreat, only part of the battalion managed to break through to Hlybokaye. Captain Szyłejka and his group were surrounded by cavalry and taken prisoner. In Hlybokaye, the remnants of the regiment were reinforced by soldiers from various First Polish Army units and formed into a battalion to defend the Olszanka line.

In the following days, the regiment suffered such heavy losses that it was no longer possible to form a larger unit from its remnants. It was withdrawn from the front and sent to Jarosław for replenishment and reorganization. At the end of August, the regiment returned to the front lines and participated in battles near Kutkorz and Milatyn, where it lost over 300 men, either killed or wounded. The regiment's last battles took place while crossing the Southern Bug river and capturing Nowokonstantynów.

During both wars, 25 officers and cadets, as well as 361 non-commissioned officers and soldiers, of the regiment were killed or died from wounds.

=== Recipients of the Virtuti Militari ===
Soldiers of the regiment awarded the Silver Cross of the War Order Virtuti Militari for the 1918–1920 war
Senior Private Julian Kartasiński	Corporal Franciszek Filip	Platoon Sergeant Stanisław Barylski
Sergeant Jan Czereba	Sergeant Józef Eliaszów	Cadet Jan Gorzko
Cadet Rudolf Götz	Cadet Władysław Kolbuszowski	Second Lieutenant Franciszek Górski
Second Lieutenant Feliks Serbeński	Second Lieutenant Bożymir Stala	Second Lieutenant Stefan Sozański
Lieutenant Stanisław Kruszyński	Lieutenant Tytus Rotter	Lieutenant Władysław Sawicki
Lieutenant Jan Schramm	Lieutenant Wacław Kruszewski	Captain Ludwik Wiktor Kopeć
Captain Stanisław Szyłejko	Captain Doctor Stanisław Ostrowski	Major Walerian Sikorski
Colonel Stanisław Eulagiusz Sobolewski		

Additionally, 59 officers, 12 cadets, 36 non-commissioned officers, and 64 enlisted men were awarded the Cross of Valour, including 7 soldiers with one clasp, 6 with two clasps, and 4 with three clasps.

== Regiment during peacetime ==
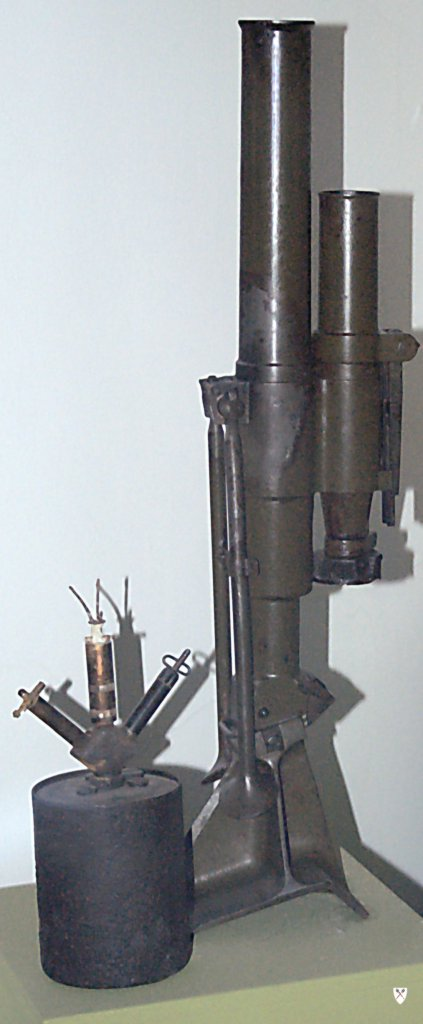
Grenade launcher wz. 36 – support weapon for infantry companies

In January 1921, the regiment's staff was relocated to Jarosław. The 1st Battalion was stationed in Stanyslaviv, while the 2nd and 3rd Battalions were in Kolomyia. By July 1921, the entire regiment was moved to Jarosław, with its headquarters at the barracks on Kościuszko Street. In 1922, the 1st and 3rd Battalions were transferred to Lubaczów, stationed at the barracks named after General Józef Zajączek. The 1st Battalion remained in Lubaczów until September 1939. Meanwhile, the 3rd Battalion was downsized in 1930 and returned to Jarosław. The reserve battalion staff was based in Jarosław.

Organizationally, from 1921, the regiment was part of the 24th Infantry Division. It comprised the headquarters, a staff battalion, three infantry battalions, and a reserve battalion staff. In 1924, the staff battalion and reserve battalion staff were dissolved and replaced by a regimental command team and two specialized platoons: pioneers and communications.

On 19 May 1927, Marshal of Poland Józef Piłsudski, Minister of Military Affairs, designated 29 April as the regiment's holiday. This date commemorated the victorious battles at Brzuchowice and Zboiska fought in 1919.

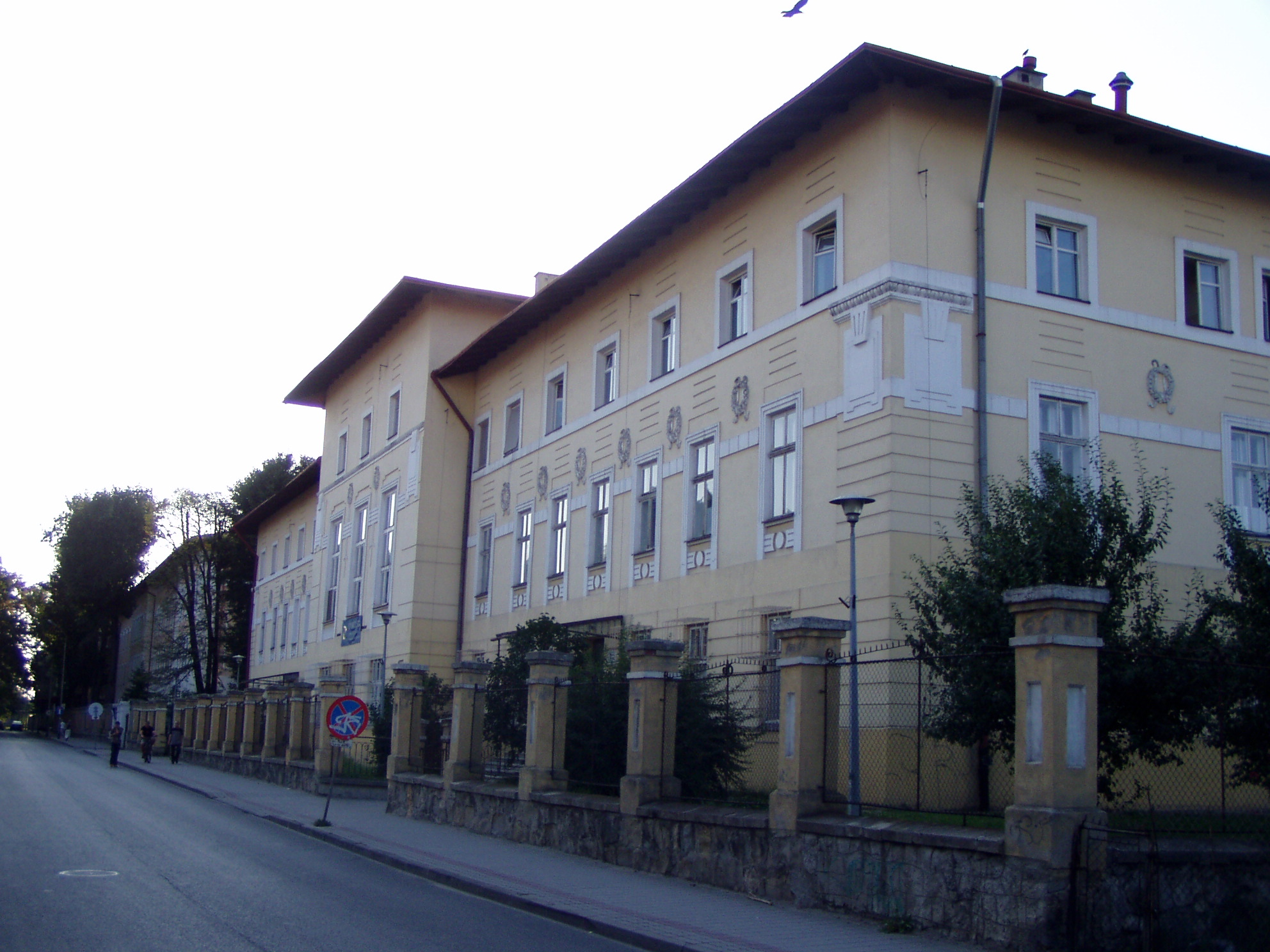
Regiment's garrison at Jarosław – now the Jarosław Independent Public Healthcare Center

Based on the 1930 implementation order from the Ministry of Military Affairs for peacetime infantry organization (PS 10-50), the Polish Armed Forces categorized infantry regiments into three types. The 39th Infantry Regiment was classified as a Type I ("normal") regiment, annually receiving about 610 recruits. The regiment's personnel consisted of 56 officers and 1,500 non-commissioned officers and soldiers. During winter, the regiment included a senior-year battalion, a training battalion, and a downsized battalion. In summer, it fielded a senior-year battalion and two conscript battalions. The regiment trained recruits for the Border Protection Corps. The 1930 reorganization introduced the following structure:

- Command and Quartermaster Department with an administrative company;
- Three infantry battalions (each with three rifle companies and one heavy machine gun company);
- Specialized units, including communications, pioneers, infantry artillery, and mounted reconnaissance.

In 1937, an anti-tank company was formed within the regiment. By 1938, this company had seven Bofors 37 mm anti-tank guns. Additionally, a reconnaissance unit was established in 1938, comprising a cyclist platoon and a mounted reconnaissance platoon.

=== Personnel and organizational structure in March 1939 ===
Position (Note: The list includes the unit's personnel composition as of immediately before the mobilization of the first units of the Polish Armed Forces on 23 March 1939, but after the last promotions announced with the date of 19 March 1939 (Rybka & Stepan (2006, p. 6)).)	Rank, name
Command
Regimental Commander	Lieutenant Colonel Roman Szymański
First Deputy Commander	Lieutenant Colonel Stanisław Tworzydło
Adjutant	Captain Stefan Józef Żółtowski
Senior Physician	Major Doctor Józef Sławik
Junior Physician	Vacant
Second Deputy Commander (Quartermaster)	Lieutenant Colonel Piotr Kaczała
Mobilization Officer	Captain (Infantry) Jakub Szutt
Deputy Mobilization Officer	Second Lieutenant Piotr Herzog
Administrative and Material Officer	Captain (Infantry) Franciszek Jachnik
Logistics Officer	Captain Intendant Adam Bolesław Markiewicz
Provisions Officer	Vacant
Transport Officer	Captain Jan Kowal
Bandmaster	Second Lieutenant Wiktor Socewicz
Signal Platoon Commander	Second Lieutenant Roman Franciszek Zub
Pioneer Platoon Commander	Second Lieutenant Cyprian Stanisław Osiński
Infantry Artillery Platoon Commander	Second Lieutenant Jan Dominik Cehak
Anti-Tank Platoon Commander	Second Lieutenant Tadeusz Gola
Reconnaissance Unit Commander	Second Lieutenant Kazimierz Bukowy
First Battalion
Battalion Commander	Lieutenant Colonel Franciszek Karol Herzog
Battalion Adjutant	Second Lieutenant Stanisław Trondowski
Logistics Deputy	Captain Władysław Leon Tomaka
Battalion Physician	Second Lieutenant Doctor Antoni Mateusz Michał Pieszak
Commander of the First Company	Captain Franciszek Ksawery Adam Wylegała
Platoon Commander	Second Lieutenant Jerzy Stanisław Głoskowski
Commander of the Second Company	Captain Miron Manuel Czmyr
Platoon Commander	Second Lieutenant Witold Marian Toth
Commander of the Third Company	Captain Edward Pycz
Platoon Commander	Second Lieutenant Jerzy Górkiewicz
Commander of the First Machine Gun Company	Major Zygmunt Ignacy Rylski
Platoon Commander	Second Lieutenant Maciej Józef Kielman
Second Battalion
Battalion Commander	Major Józef Bieniek
Commander of the Fourth Company	Second Lieutenant Mieczysław Wiktor Przybylski
Commander of the Fifth Company	Captain Jan Bronisław Toth
Platoon Commander	Second Lieutenant Marian Michał Osiczko
Platoon Commander	Second Lieutenant Kazimierz Radwański
Commander of the Sixth Company	Captain (Infantry) Jan Bojarski
Platoon Commander	Second Lieutenant Kazimierz Adam Czabanowski
Commander of the Second Machine Gun Company	Captain Zygmunt Stanisław Gawłowski
Platoon Commander	Second Lieutenant Marian Stanisław Kadlec
Platoon Commander	Second Lieutenant Witold Józef Skawiński
Third Battalion
Battalion Commander	Major Henryk Dyduch
Commander of the Seventh Company	Captain Jan Vano Nanuaszwili
Platoon Commander	Second Lieutenant Kazimierz Jarosz
Commander of the Eighth Company	Captain Eugeniusz Józef Buczyński
Platoon Commander	Second Lieutenant Leon Hieronim Zalasiński
Commander of the Ninth Company	Captain Karol Domiter
Platoon Commander	Second Lieutenant Józef Chirowski
Commander of the Third Machine Gun Company	Captain Zygmunt Gronkowski
Platoon Commander	Second Lieutenant Adam Borowiec
On Course	Second Lieutenant Władysław Franciszek Sokołowski
In Hospital	Second Lieutenant Edmund Reimann
In Hospital (Died 13 April 1939)	Second Lieutenant Filip Wołoszański
Reserve Officer Training Course
Commander	Major Antoni Fleszar
Platoon Commander	Second Lieutenant Józef Wiktor Emil Blumski
Platoon Commander	Second Lieutenant Józef Ignacy Kuś
Platoon Commander	Second Lieutenant Henryk Mickiewicz
Platoon Commander	Second Lieutenant Marian Józef Żurawski
39th Military Training District ("Jarosław")
District Commander	Captain Infantry Władysław Bochenek
County Commander (Jarosław)	Captain Infantry Stanisław Kubarski
County Commander (Przeworsk)	Captain (Infantry) Marcin Kosiński
County Commander (Lubaczów)	Captain (Infantry) Wincenty Stanisław Loster

== 39th Infantry Regiment in the September Campaign ==
=== Mobilization ===
The regiment was a mobilizing unit. According to the "W" mobilization plan, the regiment's commander was responsible for preparing and conducting the mobilization of the following units:

During the first phase of general mobilization:

- The 39th Infantry Regiment (with the 1st Battalion stationed in Lubaczów)
- Cyclist Company No. 104 (for the 36th Infantry Division)
- Independent Heavy Machine Gun and Supporting Weapons Company No. 103 (for the 24th Infantry Division)
- Independent Heavy Machine Gun and Supporting Weapons Company No. 104 (for the 36th Infantry Division)
- Assistance Company No. 198 (for the 24th Infantry Division)
- Quartermaster Park Type I No. 13
- Horse-Drawn Supply Column No. 18 (in Lubaczów, for the 24th Infantry Division)
- Horse-Drawn Supply Column No. 19 (in Lubaczów, for the 24th Infantry Division)
- Lubaczów Prisoner-of-War Camp

During the second phase of general mobilization:

- 3rd Battalion of the 154th Infantry Regiment
- March Battalion of the 39th Infantry Regiment
- March Reinforcements for Independent Heavy Machine Gun and Supporting Weapons Company No. 103

For logistical mobilization purposes, the regiment's commander was subordinated to the Jarosław Regional Supplementary Command.

=== Combat operations ===
==== Defense on the Dunajec river line ====
The first transport unloaded in Tarnów on 4 September. The 1st Battalion was bombed during this operation and suffered its first losses. A non-commissioned officer of the 2nd Company was killed, and the kitchen and supply cart were destroyed. The 2nd Battalion began unloading at noon, and although it was bombed twice, it suffered no losses. The 3rd Battalion did not unload until the morning of 5 September, and after being bombed twice, it joined the regiment the next day and remained in reserve near the area of Koszyce.

As part of the Kraków Army, the regiment was tasked with organizing the defense of the eastern bank of the Dunajec river, along a section from Zgłobice to Zbylitowska Góra, covering approximately 8 kilometers. The regiment prepared for a static defense, but without artillery support. The first clashes with German saboteurs occurred on the night of 5/6 September, during which two soldiers were killed.

The first encounter with units of the German 4th Light Division occurred on 6 September in Wojnicz, during an attempt to capture the road bridge over the Dunajec river by a motorized reconnaissance unit of the German 4th Light Division. In the afternoon, the regiment transferred its 3rd Battalion to the 38th Infantry Regiment. At the same time, the 24th Light Artillery Regiment arrived to support the division, and its 1st Battery reinforced the regiment's artillery. Around midnight, the order to retreat towards Plzeň was received.

==== Retreat to the Wisłok, Wisłoka, and San rivers. Fighting near Jawornik Ruski ====
The retreat began on the morning of 7 September. In the afternoon, the regiment crossed the Wisłok river and took positions on the edge of the forest east of the river, south of Plzeň. During the march, the regiment suffered significant losses due to chaos on the route caused by the 17th Infantry Regiment and the 38th Infantry Regiment, as well as supply columns, which were partially broken by the German 4th Light Division near Tuchów. Some lost soldiers marched towards Dębica. By the end of the 80 km march, the 3rd Battalion of the 39th Infantry Regiment had only half of its personnel remaining, as it had been engaged in fighting against German reconnaissance patrols. Before dusk, the battalion repelled a German armored-motorized advance.

On 8 September, the regiment, reinforced by the 9th Battery of the 24th Field Artillery Regiment, resumed its march as the rear guard of the 24th Infantry Division. By noon, it reached Wielopole, and by evening, it had arrived at Kozłówek. During the night of 8/9 September, due to an order for further movement towards the San river, the regiment began its march and reached the village of Węglówka by dawn. However, due to the road being blocked by the 11th Infantry Division, the regiment established a temporary defense in Bonarówka and its immediate surroundings. Here, the regiment was joined by the 60th Heavy Artillery Squadron, minus two batteries.

After the road was cleared at around 4:00 PM, the 39th Infantry Regiment, with artillery support, resumed its march and reached Domaradz at approximately 11:00 PM, where it remained overnight. On 10 September, after 2:00 AM, during the continued march towards Barycz, the regiment was halted in front of the fortified defense of the 11th Infantry Division. The regiment was not allowed to pass, so it marched along a different road to the San river through the village of Wara. Eventually, the regiment crossed the San river via field roads during the evening and night.

After a night of rest on 11 September, the 39th Infantry Regiment resumed its march from the Siedliska area, passing through Jawornik Ruski, where the regiment's marching column was ambushed by German artillery and machine guns. The ambush came from German units of the 137th Mountain Infantry Regiment and the 111th Mountain Artillery Regiment of the 2nd Mountain Division. Under fire while descending the slope, the regiment's column split into two parts. One part, consisting of the 3rd Battalion and part of the 2nd Battalion, supported by an infantry artillery platoon, established a defensive position and repelled the German assault by 11:00 AM. At 12:00 PM, this part of the column launched a counterattack against the German positions, allowing the remaining part of the regiment to withdraw eastward toward Kotów and then further to Jasienica Sufczyńska.

After 2:00 PM, the incomplete 2nd and 3rd Battalions, under the command of Major Józef Bieniek, retreated towards Piątkowa. After reaching Iskań and then Tarnawka, both battalions rested. During the fighting near Jawornik Ruski, the 39th Infantry Regiment suffered heavy losses, including the death of Captain Leopold Arendt and many wounded, including First Lieutenant Stanisław Trondowski, who was seriously injured. The regiment lost most of its supply columns and some mortars.

At dawn on 12 September, the regiment resumed its march toward Bircza. Major Bieniek's group traveled along the San river, through Krasiczyn, to Kruhel Wielki. The 1st Battalion, along with the remainder of the 2nd Battalion, the 9th Company of the 3rd Battalion, and part of the special units, managed to pass through Kotów and reached the area east of Bircza by 12 September. By evening, the regiment had arrived at the division's reserve in Kruhel Wielki, where both groups reunited. After these battles, the regiment's strength was reduced to the size of two battalions. During the fighting near Jawornik Ruski and the subsequent march, Lieutenant Colonel Roman Szymański attended a meeting at the division headquarters.

==== Battle of Boratycze and Husaków ====
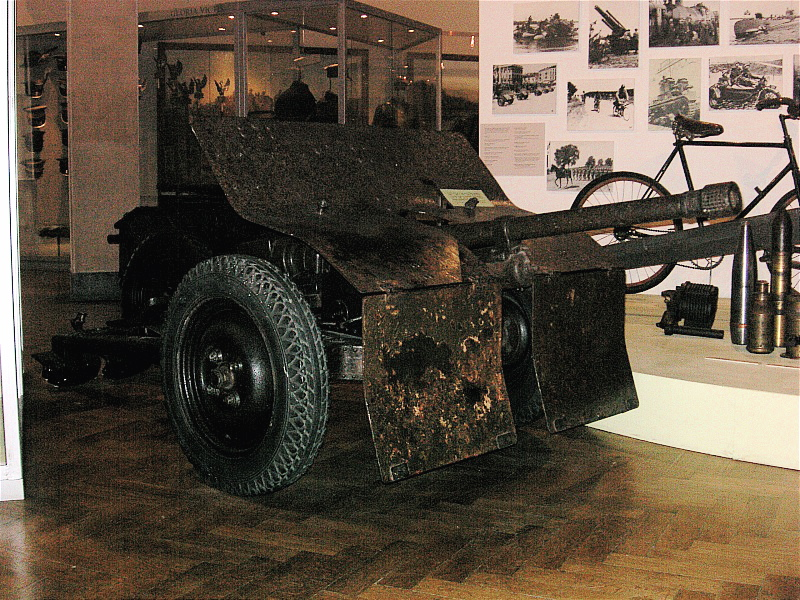
Anti-tank gun Bofors wz. 36

On the evening of 13 September, the commander of the Lesser Poland Army, General K. Sosnkowski, ordered the 24th Infantry Division to conduct a forced march toward Lviv to defend the Romanian bridgehead along the Dniester–Stryi line. In response to this order, the 39th Infantry Regiment received the directive to march to Husaków through Pikulice and Nehrybka. During a stop in Prałkowce and Kruhel Wielki, the shattered Nowy Sącz Battalion reinforced the units. The remnants of the III Battalion formed the 7th Rifle Company under the command of Lieutenant L. Zalasiński. The regimental band was also disbanded. The regiment's structure after reorganization:

- I and II Battalions with standard heavy machine gun companies;
- Reconnaissance company with two heavy machine guns;
- Four 81 mm mortars;
- Four 37 mm anti-tank guns;
- Two 75 mm artillery pieces.

On the morning of 14 September, German units from the 2nd Mountain Division attacked the defending forces of the 24th Infantry Division in the area of Tyszkowice, Boratycze, and Chodnowice. After repelling the German assault, the 155th Infantry Regiment and a battalion of the 38th Infantry Regiment counterattacked Boratycze Forest. The Germans introduced fresh battalions into the fight and, with strong artillery support, launched another assault on the positions of the 155th Infantry Regiment and the 38th Infantry Regiment battalion, pushing them from the forest edge into its interior.

By order of Colonel Bolesław Schwarzenberg-Czerny, the commander of the 24th Infantry Division, the 39th Infantry Regiment and a composite regiment of the 24th Infantry Division were directed to retake the lost positions. Advancing from Chodnowice northward, the regiment attacked a wooded hill west of Boratycze. The 1st Battalion, led by Lieutenant Colonel Piotr Kaczała, surprised and forced the reconnaissance unit of the German 2nd Mountain Division to retreat.

In the first wave, the 6th and 7th Rifle Companies, along with the divisional 103rd Machine Gun and Armored Train Company, spearheaded the attack. The regiment then, in conjunction with the 155th Infantry Regiment, launched an assault on Boratycze Forest. After intense fighting, the Germans were forced to withdraw. At a critical moment, the regiment's standard-bearer appeared on the battlefield, boosting morale. Victory came at a heavy cost, with significant casualties, including Lieutenant Kazimierz Czabanowski. The regiment was reduced to three incomplete companies, each consisting of only a few dozen soldiers.

The fighting continued until the evening. The regiment subsequently withdrew to Husaków and, after passing through the bombed-out and burning city, marched toward Balice.

==== Battle at Mużyłowice Kolonia. March to the Yaniv forests ====
Upon reaching the Mościska region, the 39th Infantry Regiment, under divisional orders, continued its march through Tuligłowy to the Zarzecze Forest. It arrived at its destination on the afternoon of 15 September. During a stop, the regiment was joined by a marching battalion under Major Henryk Dyduch, two anti-tank guns from the III Battalion that had participated in the defense of Przemyśl, and remnants of other subunits from the Przemyśl garrison.

In the afternoon, the regiment moved to its starting position for a planned nighttime assault via Słomianki. On the morning of 16 September, the regiment's vanguard reached Mużyłowice Kolonia, encountering fierce resistance from remnants of the III Battalion of SS-Standarte Germania, which had been routed the previous night by the 11th Infantry Division. Lieutenant Colonel Piotr Kaczała's 1st Battalion launched an assault, while the reconnaissance company of the 39th Infantry Regiment outflanked the German defenses. The German unit was destroyed, but the Polish side suffered the loss of Lieutenant Kazimierz Bukowy. The 39th Infantry Regiment advanced to Mołoszkowice and then to the Yaniv forests (northwest of Lviv), where it took defensive positions in the "Na Chmurowem" woods along the southeastern and southern edges.

At dawn on 17 September, German battle groups from the 1st Mountain Division approached the 24th Infantry Division's defensive positions. Following a heavy artillery barrage, German mountain infantry launched an assault on the 24th Infantry Division's units, including the sector held by the 39th Infantry Regiment. The 1st Battalion of the 39th Infantry Regiment faced particularly heavy attacks. Despite intense fighting, all German assaults were repelled.

After nightfall, the regiment disengaged from the enemy and marched through the 336 Forest toward Kertyna. There, it joined the main forces of the 24th Infantry Division and marched with them toward Yaniv. By this time, the regiment's companies were reduced to approximately 50 soldiers each, and the reconnaissance company had ceased to exist. On the morning of 18 September, the regiment reached Yaniv. At this point, Lieutenant Colonel Roman Szymański carried out another reorganization of the 39th Infantry Regiment, forming it into a composite infantry battalion and a heavy machine gun company.

==== Final battles near Lviv and the disbandment of the regiment ====
After a brief stop in Yaniv, the composite battalion of the 39th Infantry Regiment marched toward Jamelnia, Kozice, and Rzęsna Ruska. The march was halted at the outskirts of Rzęsna Ruska by units of the German 1st Mountain Division. With the road to Lviv cut off for General Sosnkowski's group, an order was issued to attack Rzęsna Ruska. In addition to the 39th Infantry Regiment's composite battalion, Lieutenant Colonel Szymański was given command of composite battalions from the 38th and 17th Infantry Regiments, as well as two battalions formed from Border Protection Corps and National Defense units.

The assault was launched from the Kozice area with artillery support from the 24th Infantry Division. The 39th Infantry Regiment's battalion under Major Bieniek, the 38th Infantry Regiment's battalion led by Major Böhm, the 17th Infantry Regiment's battalion commanded by Major Weisbach, and the Border Protection Corps/National Defense battalion under Major Dembowski advanced. The 39th Infantry Regiment's battalion fought its way into the northwestern part of Rzęsna Ruska, engaging in fierce combat for individual buildings. The 38th Infantry Regiment's battalion captured the Rzęsna Ruska manor and reached the village's southwestern edge, while the other battalions were halted near the Skitniki Manor.

At 10:00 AM, upon Lieutenant Colonel Szymański's request, a composite battalion from the 1st Podhale Rifles Regiment under Major Serafiniuk was introduced. This battalion entered the forest north of the Skitniki Manor but was pushed back by a German counterattack to the manor itself, which it managed to hold. The 39th Infantry Regiment's battalion secured the western part of the village, while the 38th Infantry Regiment's battalion took the southern edge. Despite fierce fighting, the attack stalled midway through the village due to lack of support. Heavy casualties were sustained, including Major Józef Bieniek and Lieutenant Marian Żurawski, who were seriously wounded. Lieutenant Colonel Piotr Kaczała assumed command of the battalion.

By 4:00 PM, the remnants of the 155th Infantry Regiment were deployed, securing part of the forest north of Rzęsna Ruska. The 24th Infantry Division units in Rzęsna Ruska and its vicinity came under German air attacks. At 5:00 PM, further advances were halted with the arrival of tanks from the German 5th Panzer Division. These tanks attacked Lieutenant Colonel Kaczała's battalion positions but were countered by anti-tank weapons, 75mm artillery, and other divisional artillery units, suffering losses.

Due to lack of reserves, the attack was abandoned. On General Sosnkowski's orders, the units withdrew to the Brzuchowice Forest. Vehicles, remaining artillery, heavy equipment, and transport were destroyed. Remaining soldiers regrouped and reorganized into two heavy machine gun companies and two rifle companies, numbering around 200 soldiers in total.

At 10:00 PM, the regiment began a night march to Brzuchowice. By midnight, General Sosnkowski reestablished contact with the commander of the 11th Carpathian Infantry Division and rescinded the previous order to disband the units and destroy heavy equipment. Unfortunately, the regiment had already destroyed its mortars and two infantry artillery sections. However, it retained 20 heavy machine guns, five anti-tank guns, four anti-tank rifles, and most light machine guns. The remnants of the 39th Infantry Regiment, along with elements of the 38th Infantry Regiment, the 155th Infantry Regiment, and the 1st Podhale Rifles Regiment, were reorganized into a composite battalion under Major Józef Böhm. On 19 September, these remnants engaged in the Brzuchowice Forest battles.

Fierce fighting to break through to Lviv began on the afternoon of 19 September near Hołosków Mały and continued uninterrupted until the evening of 20 September. By then, approximately 400 soldiers, four anti-tank guns, and eight heavy machine guns remained from the composite battalion. Around 8:00 PM, an attempt was made to break through to Lviv via a ravine leading from a military shooting range to Zboiska, but the German lines could not be breached.

On the night of 20/21 September, a final group of 300–400 soldiers, including several dozen from the 39th Infantry Regiment, attempted to break through to Dublany and the Hungarian border under Lieutenant Colonel Szymański, Captain Domiter, and General Sosnkowski. Upon encountering German defenses, Lieutenant Colonel Szymański ordered the group and regiment disbanded. Soldiers were instructed to reach the border or return home in small groups. On 21 September 1939, the Jarosław-based 39th Lviv Rifle Regiment ceased to exist.

=== Organizational structure and personnel assignment in September 1939 ===
Position	Rank, name
Command
Regiment Commander	Lieutenant Colonel Roman Szymański
First Adjutant	Captain Stefan Józef Żółtowski
Second Adjutant	Captain Jan Vano Nanuaszwili
Communications Officer	Captain Eugeniusz Józef Buczyński
Liaison Officer	Second Lieutenant Józef Chirowski
Quartermaster	Captain Władysław Leon Tomaka
Chief Medical Officer	Lieutenant Doctor Antoni Mateusz Pieszak
Supply Company Commander	Captain Stanisław Bronszewski
First Battalion
Battalion Commander	Lieutenant Colonel Piotr Kaczała
Battalion Adjutant	Second Lieutenant Antoni Piotrowski
Commander of First Rifle Company	Reserve Lieutenant Władysław Todt
Commander of First Platoon	Second Lieutenant Jerzy Stanisław Głoskowski († 14 September, Tyszkowice)
Commander of Second Platoon	Second Lieutenant Maciej Józef Kielman
Commander of Third Platoon	Senior Sergeant Ciećkiewicz
Commander of Second Rifle Company	Lieutenant Michał Kwieciński
Commander of Third Rifle Company	Captain Edward Pycz
Commander of First Platoon	Reserve Lieutenant Stanisław Szczerbiński
Company Sergeant	Sergeant Józef Bąk
Commander of First Machine Gun Company	Captain Miron Manuel Czmyr
Commander of First Platoon	Reserve Second Lieutenant Henryk Ginalski
Second Battalion
Battalion Commander	Major Józef Bieniek
Battalion Adjutant	Reserve Second Lieutenant Alfred Sobel († 20 September)
Communications Platoon Commander	Second Lieutenant Arnold Kübler
Commander of Fourth Rifle Company	Reserve Captain Józef Dziedzic
Commander of Fifth Rifle Company	Captain Zygmunt Rylski
Commander of Sixth Rifle Company	Lieutenant Kazimierz Czabanowski († 14 September, Tyszkowce)
Commander of Second Machine Gun Company	Lieutenant Stanisław Trondowski (until 10 September 1939)
Commander of First Platoon	Reserve Second Lieutenant Ludwik Marian Krowicki
Third Battalion
Battalion Commander	Captain Zygmunt Gawłowski
Battalion Adjutant	
Communications Platoon Commander	Sergeant Emil Opielowski
Commander of Seventh Rifle Company	Lieutenant Leon Hieronim Zalasiński
Commander of First Platoon	Second Lieutenant Poba
Commander of Eighth Rifle Company	Reserve Captain Leopold Arendt († 10 September 1939)
Commander of Ninth Rifle Company	Captain Karol Domiter
Commander of First Platoon	Reserve Second Lieutenant Edmund Reimann († 18 September, Rzęsna Ruska)
Commander of Third Machine Gun Company	Lieutenant Marian Józef Żurawski
Commander of First Platoon	Lieutenant Edmund Szczerbiński
Special units
Anti-Tank Company Commander	Unknown
Reconnaissance Company Commander	Lieutenant Kazimierz Bukowy († 18 September, Mużyłowice)
Cavalry Reconnaissance Platoon Commander	Warrant Officer Stefan Bajorski
Cyclist Platoon Commander	Sergeant Jan Tedys, Sergeant Jan Bogucki
Infantry Reconnaissance Platoon	Senior Sergeant Stefan Wańczycki
Infantry Artillery Platoon Commander	Artillery Lieutenant Jan Dominik Cehak
Pioneers Platoon Commander	Senior Sergeant Stanisław Szajnar
Anti-Gas Platoon Commander	Unknown
Communications Platoon Commander	Sergeant Emil Opielowski
Deputy Platoon Commander	Sergeant Stanisław Argasiński
N1 Radio Station Commander	Sergeant Józef Babiarz

== Symbols of the regiment ==
=== Regimental banner ===
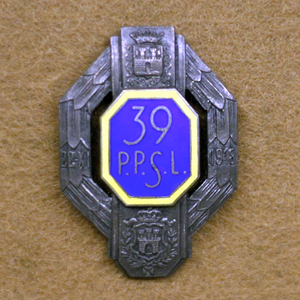
Badge

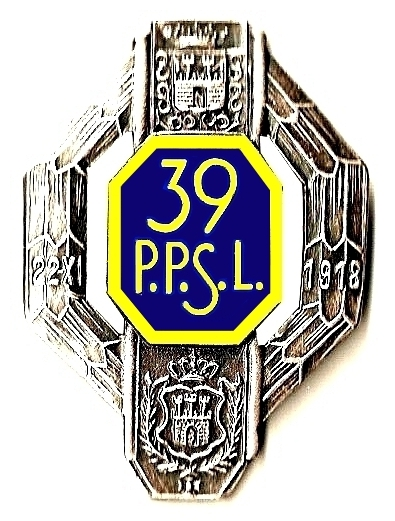
Officer's badge

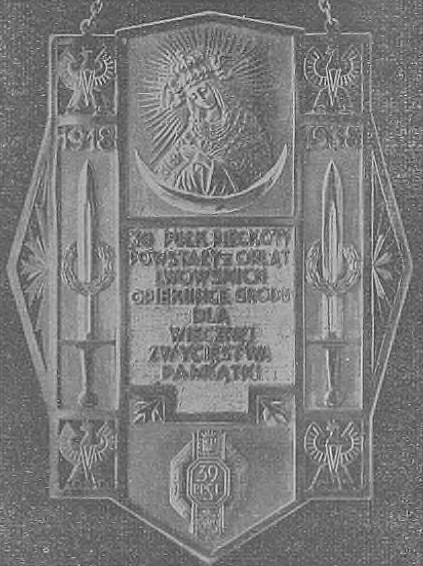
Gorget from 1938

On 9 May 1923, the President of Poland, Stanisław Wojciechowski, approved the design of the banner for the 39th Infantry Regiment. On 29 April 1924, General Lucjan Żeligowski, on behalf of the President, presented the banner to the then-regimental commander, Colonel Edward Kańczucki. The banner was funded by the Polish diaspora in Detroit.

The color motif on both sides of the cloth featured a red Maltese cross on a white background. In the center of the right side was a laurel wreath with an embroidered silver eagle. Between the arms of the cross, also within the laurel wreath, were the regiment's numbers: 39. The center of the left side displayed a laurel wreath with the motto of the Polish Army, Honor i Ojczyzna (Honor and Homeland). In the corners were the coats of arms of Lviv and Jarosław, as well as an image of the Virgin Mary. On the arms of the cross were the names of places and dates significant to the regiment's combat traditions:

- Victory at Brzuchowice and Zboiska on 29 April 1919
- Occupation of Hłuboczek and Tarnopol on 1 June 1919
- Capture of Nowokonstantynów on 24 February 1920
- Battle on the Avuta river on 4 July 1920

The staff was topped with a silver finial featuring an eagle facing left, with spread wings, sitting on a base with the regiment's number. Below the eagle's base, a white-and-red ribbon cockade was affixed to the staff.

In September 1939, as the regiment left for the front, the banner was not left at the Regimental Reserve Depot. Instead, it accompanied the regiment to the front in the chaplain's staff vehicle and followed the entire combat route. On 14 September, during the battle at Boratycze and Husaków, when German forces broke through the defenses, the banner's guard took it onto the battlefield, helping to restore order and suppress panic. On the night of 18 September, it was buried near a forester's lodge in the Brzuchowice Forest. It subsequently went missing, and its fate remains unknown. However, the eagle finial from the banner, bearing the number 39 on its base, was later discovered in the Museum of the Army in Paris.

=== Commemorative badge ===
On 23 April 1929, the Minister of Military Affairs, Marshal of Poland Józef Piłsudski, approved the design and regulations for the commemorative badge of the 39th Infantry Regiment. The badge, measuring 40×28 mm, has the shape of an octagonal shield surrounded by a stylized laurel wreath. The wreath bears the date "22 XI 1918" – marking the battles in defense of and for the liberation of Lviv. Inside the wreath is an octagon with a double border, bearing the regiment's number and initials: "39 P.P.S.L.". Above the octagon is the coat of arms of Jarosław, and below it is the coat of arms of Lviv. The officer's badge was embossed in silver and partially enamelled. The octagonal field was navy blue, with a yellow border. This color scheme was closely associated with the dark blue uniforms and yellow facings of the Polish infantry from the Napoleonic era and the November Uprising. The soldiers' badge was embossed in brass and was not enamelled.

=== Gorget ===
In 1938, during the celebrations of the defense of Lviv in 1918, a gorget was placed on the image of Our Lady of Ostra Brama in the church dedicated to this invocation in Lviv. The gorget, created by the 39th Lviv Rifle Regiment (descended from the Lwów Eaglets), featured an image of Our Lady of Ostra Brama and was presented with the inscription "To the Guardian of the City, as a lasting symbol of victory". The design was created by Rudolf Mękicki, and the piece was made of silver, partially gilded by Kazimierz Wojtych.

== Lviv riflemen ==
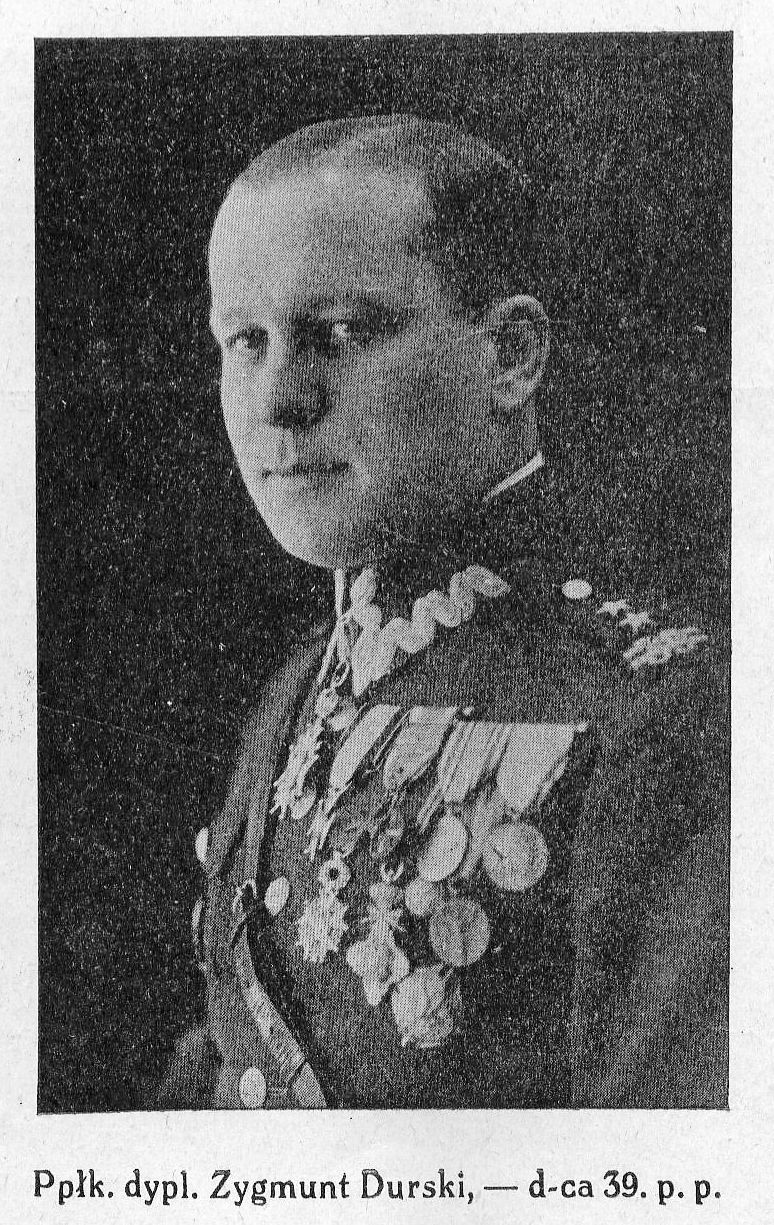
Lieutenant Colonel Zygmunt Durski

=== Commanders of the regiment ===
- Lieutenant Colonel Jan Ryszard Hausner (25 November 1918 – 20 June 1919)
- Major Czunikin Krasowiecki (23 June – 1 July 1919)
- Major Kazimierz Topoliński (2 July – 7 August 1919)
- Colonel Stanisław Eulagiusz Sobolewski (8 August 1919 – 15 June 1920)
- Captain of Artillery Karol Battaglia (16 June – 15 July 1920)
- Colonel Stanisław Eulagiusz Sobolewski (16–28 July 1920)
- Lieutenant Colonel Franciszek Goliński (29 July – 27 August 1920)
- Major of Infantry Bolesław Pytel (27 August 1920 – 23 February 1921)
- Lieutenant Colonel / Colonel of Infantry Edward Kańczucki (1 June 1921 – 31 March 1927 → Reassignment for recruitment duties at the Kalisz Military Recruitment Office)
- Lieutenant Colonel / Colonel Zygmunt Durski (5 May 1927 – 22 December 1934 → Commander of Infantry for the 22nd Infantry Division)
- Lieutenant Colonel Józef Gruszka (22 December 1934 – †18 November 1937)
- Lieutenant Colonel Roman Szymański (1938 – 20 November 1939)

=== Deputy commanders of the regiment ===
- Lieutenant Colonel of Infantry Stefan Wyspiański (1923 – April 1924 → Deputy Commander of the 68th Infantry Regiment)
- Honorary Colonel of Infantry Stanisław Palle (April 1924 – May 1925)
- Lieutenant Colonel of Infantry Tadeusz Jeziorański (1925 – 11 October 1926 → Reassigned under the regiment commander)
- Lieutenant Colonel of Infantry Konrad Witold Sieciński (11 October 1926 – 31 March 1927 → Reassignment for recruitment duties at the Jarosław Military Recruitment Office)
- Major / Lieutenant Colonel of Infantry Franciszek Szyszka (5 May 1927 – August 1932 → Retired as of 30 November 1932)
- Lieutenant Colonel of Engineers Henryk Bagiński (10 August 1932 – 8 April 1934)
- Lieutenant Colonel of Infantry Stanisław Sztarejko (8 May 1934 – October 1935 → General Staff)
- Lieutenant Colonel of Infantry Stanisław Tworzydło (until August 1939 → Commander of the Reserve Center for the 24th Infantry Division)

=== Second deputy (quartermaster) ===
- Major / Lieutenant Colonel of Infantry Piotr Kaczała (August 1935 – August 1939 → Commander of the 1st Battalion)

=== Soldiers of the 39th Infantry Regiment – victims of the Katyn massacre ===
Name	Rank	Profession	Workplace before mobilization	Murdered
Jerzy Albert	Second Lieutenant			Katyn
Stanisław Badowicz	Reserve Second Lieutenant	Construction technician		Kharkiv
Konstanty Chrzanowski	Reserve Lieutenant	Clerk	Central Agricultural Cooperatives Bank, Lviv	Kharkiv
Jan Piotr Cypryś	Reserve Second Lieutenant	Teacher	School in Jarosław County	Kharkiv
Miron Czmyr	Captain	Professional soldier	Commander of 2/39 Infantry Regiment; CO of 1 MMG Company (September 1939)	Kharkiv
Jerzy Górkiewicz	Second Lieutenant	Professional soldier	Platoon Commander of 3/39 Infantry Regiment; CO of 2/39 Battalion (September 1939)	Kharkiv
Zbigniew Gutka	Reserve Second Lieutenant	Construction technician	G. Franke Works in Nisko	Kharkiv
Edward Hanus	Reserve Second Lieutenant	Philology graduate	Gymnasium	Katyn
Wacław Hermach	Reserve Lieutenant	Clerk	State Revenue Office, Lviv	Katyn
Julian Henryk Kazatel	Reserve Second Lieutenant	Builder		Katyn
Jan Kotlewski	Reserve Second Lieutenant			Katyn
Władysław Karpiński	Reserve Captain	Teacher		Kharkiv
Jan Kratel (Krateil)	Reserve Second Lieutenant	Landowner	Owner of Zarzyszcze Estate	Katyn
Eugeniusz Kulikowski	Reserve Second Lieutenant	Teacher		Kharkiv
Bolesław Müller	Reserve Lieutenant	Teacher	School principal in Łukawiec	Kharkiv
Kazimierz Rogoziński	Reserve Second Lieutenant			Katyn
Jakub Szutt	Captain	Professional soldier	Mobilization Officer, 39th Infantry Regiment; CO of III Battalion, 39th Infantry Regiment (September 1939)	Kharkiv
Bogusław Trondowski	Reserve Second Lieutenant	Teacher		Kharkiv
Stanisław Zajączkowski	Reserve Second Lieutenant	Clerk	Polish Post Office	Kharkiv

== Bibliography ==
- Kubrak, Zygmunt (1999). 39 Pułk Piechoty [39th Infantry Regiment] (in Polish). Pruszków: Ajaks. ISBN 978-83-87103-84-2.
- Rybka, Ryszard; Stepan, Kamil (2006). Rocznik oficerski 1939. Stan na dzień 23 marca 1939 [Officer Yearbook 1939: As of 23 March 1939] (in Polish). Kraków: Fundacja CDCN. ISBN 978-83-7188-899-1.
- Smotrecki, Henryk (1929). Zarys historji wojennej 39-go pułku strzelców Lwowskich [Outline of the War History of the 39th Lviv Rifle Regiment] (in Polish). Warsaw: Wojskowe Biuro Historyczne.
