= Battle of Głębokie =

1920 Polish-Soviet War battle

- Part of Polish–Soviet War
Date	July 1920
Location	Hlybokaye (Głębokie), (Belarus)
Result	Soviet victory

Belligerents
Poland	Russian SFSR

Commanders and leaders
Lucjan Żeligowski; Władysław Jędrzejewski; Leonard Skierski	E.N. Sergeyev; August Kork

Strength
1 army (4 divisions, 1 brigade)	2 armies (7 divisions, 1 brigade)

Casualties and losses
- 1,500 (on both sides)

The Battle of Głębokie took place during the Polish–Soviet War (1919–21). It took place near the town of Głębokie (modern Hlybokaye, Belarus), 80 kilometres (50 mi) south-west of Polotsk, between July 4 and July 6, 1920. It was a part of a larger offensive by three armies of Red Army's Western Front, aimed at encircling the 1st Polish Army operating in central Belarus. In the battle both sides suffered heavy losses. While the town of Głębokie was captured by the Soviets, they failed at outflanking the Polish defenders. Because of that, the battle, being less decisive than the Soviets hoped for, was both a tactical victory and a strategic defeat for them.

Because the Polish defenders did not realise that the town of Głębokie was the focal point of the entire Soviet operation, the battle was initially known in Polish historiography as battle on the Avuta (Polish: bitwa nad Autą), after a small tributary of the Dysna River, where most of the fighting actually took place.

== Prelude ==
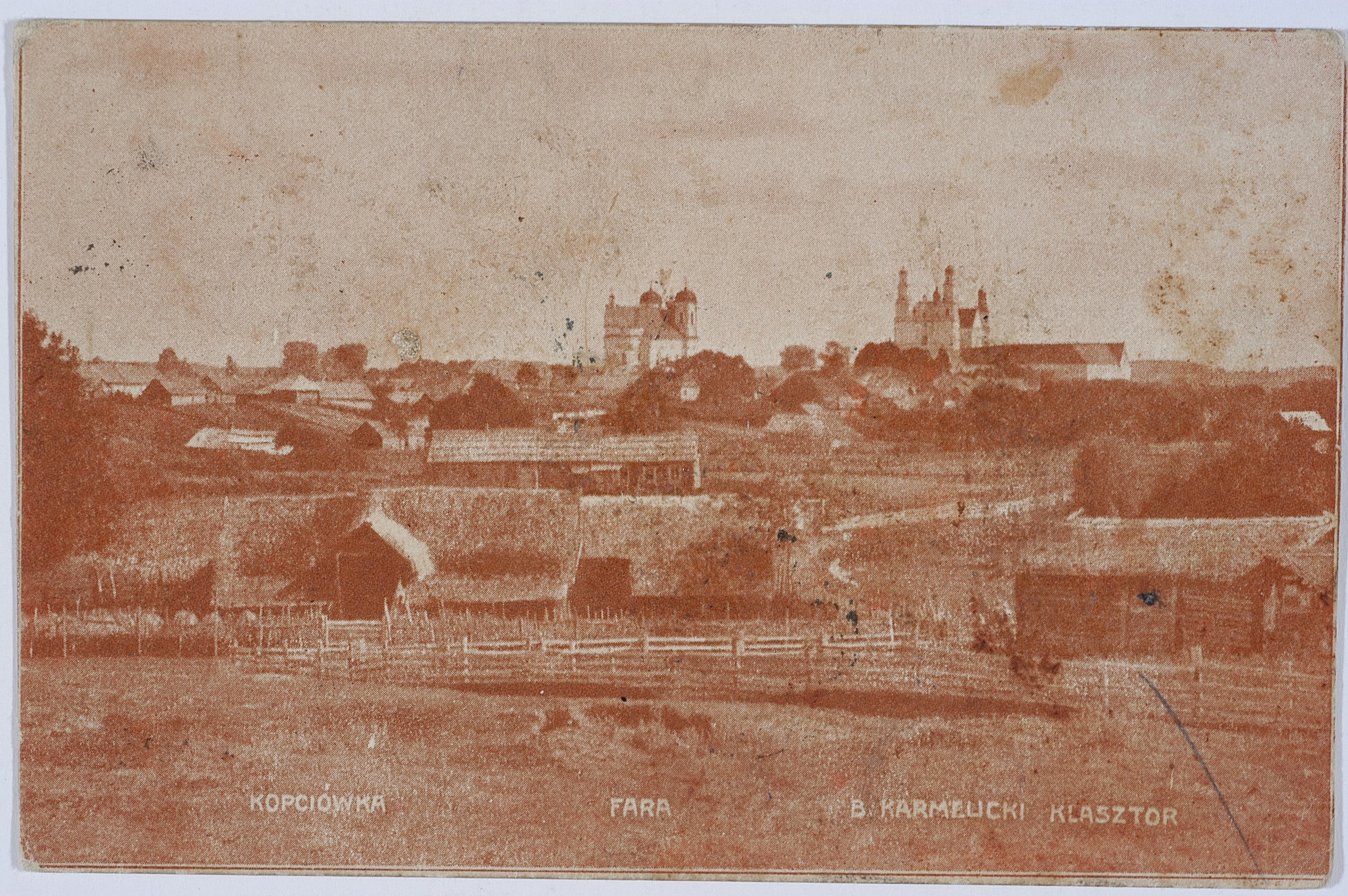
The town of Głębokie itself (here, view from 1901), badly damaged during World War I, was of little strategic value to either side.

In April and May the Polish successful Kiev offensive reached Kyiv and pushed the Red forces south of the Pripet Marshes behind the Dnieper. However, Soviet forces evaded encirclement and retreated across the river. Quite unexpectedly to the Poles, on 14 May 1920 the forces of Mikhail Tukhachevsky's Western Front started a major counter-offensive in the northern sector of the front, aimed at Głębokie-Święciany area. The offensive's objective was to outflank the Poles from the north, along the lines were the Lithuanian forces were located, and push the Poles south-west. The Polish Commander-in-Chief General Józef Piłsudski redirected some forces from the rear and the southern sector of the front and ordered the First Polish Army under Gen. Stanisław Szeptycki to immediately counter-attack on both flanks: from Polesia northwards and from the northernmost sector southwards. Despite Polish efforts, the Russian forces broke through towards Igumen and Głębokie. In two weeks Tukhachevsky created a 150 kilometres-deep bulge in Polish lines.

To counter the threat, Piłsudski ordered yet another counter-offensive. The Polish plan demanded that the Soviet 15th Army be rapidly encircled by two pincers in front of Głębokie, while the rest of Soviet forces be pushed back behind Berezina. One pincer was formed by an Operational Group of Gen. Leonard Skierski formed of the bulk of the First and Fourth Armies. It was to attack the Soviets from the south, from Minsk towards Dokszyce and Głębokie. The other group was an ad hoc Reserve Army under Gen. Kazimierz Sosnkowski that was to drive through Pastavy and Duniłowicze, and reach Głębokie as well. The counter-offensive started on 2 June 1920. The Russians offered stiff resistance at the line of 1915 Russian trenches from World War I. Despite heavy resistance, Sosnkowski's group broke through enemy right flank and forced Tukhachevsky to retreat behind the Avuta River. Although bad timing and poor coordination between both Operational Groups prevented the Poles from encircling the Soviets holding ground between Głębokie and Mołodeczno, Tukhachevsky nevertheless suffered a defeat. His 15th Army lost 12,000 soldiers while the Poles lost less than 4,000. Also, until June 10 the front was yet again stabilised and almost returned to the lines of early May.

In late June, Tukhachevsky prepared a plan for a new offensive that was aimed at encircling the Polish 1st Army in the Hermanowicze - Łużki - Głębokie triangle, thus creating a "little Sedan for the White Poles". The 15th Army (under August Kork) was to attack the Poles frontally, while the 3rd and 4th Armies were to start a pincer movement around the Polish forces.

== Opposing forces ==
=== Soviets ===
- 4th Army
  - 18th Rifle Division
  - 12th Rifle Division
  - 53rd Rifle Division
  - 164th Brigade
- 15th Army
  - 11th Rifle Division
  - 16th Rifle Division
  - 33rd Rifle Division
  - 54th Rifle Division

=== Poles ===
- 1st Army
  - 5th Infantry Division (one Bde)
  - 8th Infantry Division
  - 11th Infantry Division
  - 17th Infantry Division (in reserve)
  - VII Reserve Brigade

== Battle ==
=== July 4 ===
The northernmost sector of the Polish front was attacked by the 4th Army under Sergeyev. The 18th Rifle Division was to attack the Poles to draw their reinforcements, while the remaining forces (12th and 53rd Rifle Divisions, as well as the 164th Rifle Brigade) was to break through a narrow (10 kilometres (6.2 mi)) strip of land between Daugava River and Yelnya Lake. The bulk of the 4th Army was then to turn south towards Hermanowicze and Szarkowszczyzna, while the cavalry was to push further west, to outflank the Poles and disrupt their rear. To catch up with the enemy, the forces of the 4th Red Army were to cross between 22 and 40 versts (23.5 to 42.7 km) on the first day and between 18 and 24 versts (19.2 to 25.6 km) the second day. The attack, postponed until 8:00 hours due to the morning fog, was reinforced with 70 field guns and 8 pieces of heavy artillery. The Polish line in the area was lightly held by a token force of two battalions from the 33rd Infantry Regiment of the 8th Infantry Division, with one battalion in reserve, deep behind the line and 10 pieces of divisional artillery. By 9:00 the Reds captured the first lines. However, by then the element of surprise was gone. Despite numerical inferiority, the 33rd Regiment counter-attacked several times and the Russian advance stalled until 16:00 hours, when the two Polish battalions withdrew with their heavy equipment. It was not until 18:00 hours that the Russian 4th Army started its forced march towards the Polish rear. The diversionary attack by the 18th Rifle Division was even less successful. Despite heavy losses on both sides, the division was stopped by an infantry brigade from the 10th Infantry Division.

The southernmost 3rd Army had equally ambitious aims: by the end of the first day it was to capture Dokszyce some 25 kilometres (16 mi) behind Polish line, while on the second day it was to capture the entire Polotsk-Mołodeczno railway and cut all the retreat routes for the Polish 1st Army. The 3rd Army faced elements of the 11th Infantry Division and a single brigade from the 1st Lithuanian–Belarusian Division. Despite huge numerical superiority, by the end of the day the Russians managed to establish isolated bridgeheads across Berezina some 8 kilometres (5.0 mi) behind the Polish trenches, but most of the units covered 4 kilometres (2.5 mi) at most. Both flanks thus failed to achieve their objectives and did not threaten the Polish rear.

The Soviet centre was formed by the 15th Army with four rifle divisions spread across a front of 50 kilometres (31 mi). Polish line in this sector was manned by a single brigade of the 5th Infantry Division (the IX Infantry Brigade, 38th and 39th "Lwów Rifles" Regiments), VII Reserve Brigade and the 11th Infantry Division holding the area north of the Polotsk-Mołodeczno railway. The entire 17th Infantry Division was held in reserve. During the first day of the offensive the Russian forces south of the railway successfully pushed the Poles back approximately 8 kilometres (5.0 mi), behind the Mniuta River near the town of Plisa. However, the bulk of the 15th Army fighting north of the railway was less successful. The Polish 10th and 17th Divisions successfully counter-attacked and by the end of the day the Russians gained not more than 4 kilometres (2.5 mi) of land. This success came at a price: the brigade of the 5th Division and the VII Reserve Brigade suffered catastrophic losses and had to be withdrawn from the front. Furthermore, by that point the 1st Army had committed all of its assets and reserves to the fight except for the 8th Infantry Division in the far north.

=== July 5 ===
The following day the 4th Army resumed its march on the right flank of the Bolshevik forces, this time practically unopposed as the two battalions it had been facing the previous day withdrew westwards, away from the rest of the 8th Division. Only in the afternoon the remaining two battalions of the division were attacked by the front guard of the Russian force near the village of Pohost. In a series of skirmishes neither side gained an upper hand. However, because of those fights the 12th and 53rd Russian Rifle Divisions stopped their march westwards and faced south, giving the Polish units some badly needed time to regroup and evade encirclement. Gen. Lucjan Żeligowski withdrew his 10th Infantry Division behind Mniuta River to shorten the line, but the Russian force did not follow.

In the centre the Russian offensive slowed down to a crawl. Despite the weakness of the Polish lines, the southernmost Russian divisions (11th and 33rd) pushed only a couple of kilometres forward, while the northern group (16th and 54th Rifle Divisions) did not even reach the new Polish line along the Mniuta River. However, Polish forces were equally exhausted. Despite orders to counter-attack and regain the initiative, the Polish centre remained mostly inactive, with only the Polish 10th Division fighting heavily against the Russian 54th along the Mniuta River in the village of Łużki. The 3rd Army also slowed down and by noon did not enter into contact with the Polish forces, limiting the battle to sporadic artillery duels.

To regain the initiative, around noon the 1st Army ordered a tactical withdrawal to break off from the enemy and mount a renewed counter-offensive. However, not all Polish units received the order simultaneously while the northernmost group under Gen. Żeligowski did not receive it at all. Shortly before 14:00 Gen. Rządkowski's forces, including the 1st Lithuanian-Belarusian Division, started a forced march towards Mołodeczno. The central group under Gen. Jędrzejowski (including 17th Division and the VII Reserve Brigade) was already performing a withdrawal westwards, towards Duniłowicze, when the order reached his headquarters to change the direction and move south, to cover the flank of the Polish 4th Army. By that time Jędrzejowski had already dispatched his supply trains and services westwards. The battered units under Jędrzejowski's command thus started a march along the front of the entire Russian army, under constant artillery barrage, deprived of supplies and even field kitchens. The new orders also exposed the flank of Gen. Żeligowski's forces, still successfully fighting in the north. Despite this obvious mistake, the Russians did not take advantage of the situation and their 4th and 15th Armies remained mostly stationary for the remainder of the day in that sector, which allowed Jędrzejowski's force to reach the new line the next day. The Russian forces, still shaken from their previous defeats, often overestimated the Polish forces they were facing and followed orders reluctantly, which caused further disarray in their ranks.

By the end of the day Gen. Żeligowski's group became increasingly exposed to enemy action and enemy patrols started appearing behind his 10th Division, fighting in Łużki on the Mniuta River. Both his divisions (8th and 10th) were also pressed from the front by the remainder of the 4th Army. Unable to establish contact with his southern neighbours, in the evening Żeligowski also ordered a retreat towards Duniłowicze, where he expected to find the forces of Gen. Jędrzejowski.

=== July 6 ===
Overnight the 10th Division reached Mosarz, while the 8th reached Szarkowszczyzna. Unable to find friendly units there, he continued the withdrawal towards Duniłowicze, a town he occupied by the end of the day. With no sign of either friendly or enemy forces, and no pressure from the east, Żeligowski became convinced that his forces are already behind enemy lines and that the Russians are attacking towards south-west, in the direction of Mołodeczno. Although tempted to attack the centre of what he considered the rear of enemy front, the town of Głębokie which had been abandoned by Polish forces the previous day, eventually he ordered further withdrawal westwards. In reality, the town of Głębokie was free from enemy presence and no enemy units were following Gen. Jędrzejowski's force. Only in the evening was the town captured by a weak Kuban Brigade and front guard of the badly-beaten 54th Rifle Division. Simultaneously the entire Russian force was regrouping for a renewed offensive against what Mikhail Tukhachevsky perceived as the main group of Polish forces due south. By noon of July 7 Żeligowski reached the shores of Myadzel Lake. The pursuing forces, namely the 18th Rifle Division, did not reach that area until the evening of July 10.

== Outcome ==
While the battle for Głębokie proved a tactical victory for the Russian side, it was a strategic defeat. The town was taken, but the basic aims of the entire operation were not met. The Polish 1st Army successfully withdrew and evaded three enemy armies trying to encircle it. Only a small Corps-sized Operational Group of Gen. Lucjan Żeligowski (8th and 10th Infantry Divisions) did not receive the orders to withdraw and offered some resistance before finally breaking off and retreating westwards. The bulk of the 1st Army, namely the Operational Group of Gen. Władysław Jędrzejewski, reached Mołodeczno without further contact with the enemy. In his post-war memoirs E.N. Sergeyev, the commanding officer of the 4th Army, recalled that Tukhachevsky was unaware that his plan failed and after the battle ordered the Poles to be surrounded in the area of Osinogródek and Kuryłowicze, some 25 kilometres (16 mi) west of Głębokie, even though the 1st Army had already been withdrawn further west.

Despite retaining cohesion, the 1st Army suffered serious losses in manpower and, more importantly, morale. It tried to form a new front line at the line of 1916 German and Russian trenches of World War I, running in front of Wilno (modern Vilnius, Lithuania). However, Hayk Bzhishkyan's Cavalry Corps joined the fight against the battle-weary 1st Army and achieved what the forces of Tukhachevski couldn't. The trench line had to be abandoned, and the 1st Army withdrew further west, to the Grodno-Neman River-Shchara River-Ogiński Canal. The Cavalry Corps broke through that line as well in the aftermath of a three-day-long First Battle of Grodno of 20 July 1920. The 1st Army then set up a new defensive line along the Bug River, but its defence was equally unsuccessful. It was not until the victorious Battle of Warsaw of mid-August that the retreat stopped and the Polish forces regained initiative. By the end of October the Poles regained Głębokie and reached more or less the line they had lost in July.

== Notes ==
- Belarus is a multi-ethnic region with a complicated history. Because of that practically all toponyms have their equivalents in Belarusian (with at least two transliterations to Latin alphabet), Russian, Polish, Lithuanian, German and many other languages. For the sake of clarity this article uses Polish place names throughout.
- The division was originally called the Lithuanian-Belarusian Division (Polish: Dywizja Litewsko-Białoruska). In the early summer of 1920 it was renamed the 19th Infantry Division, in line with other Polish units of the time. Soon after the battle of Radzymin General Piłsudski reversed his decision and the division was renamed to its former name. Soon afterwards it was split into two divisions, the 1st and 2nd Lithuanian-Belarusian Divisions. Because of all those name changes, both contemporary and modern sources often use all variants of the name interchangeably.
