= Polish–Soviet War order of battle: Poland =

During the Polish–Soviet War fought from February 1919 to October 1920 (ended by armistice in March 1921) between Soviet Russia and the Second Polish Republic – in the aftermath of World War I in Europe – the Polish order of battle included broad disposition of personnel, strength, organization, and command structure.

In late 1920, the Polish Army had a total of 23 infantry divisions and nine cavalry brigades. Each infantry division had two brigades, each one having three regiments. Frequently, the infantry divisions were divided for specific tasks, with the resulting brigade-sized formations being called 'groups'. Larger ad hoc formations of more than a single division were called operational groups (Grupa operacyjna) rather than corps.

== List of divisions ==
The numbering of the large infantry units in August 1920 was then as follows: 1st-18th Infantry Divisions, 1st and 2nd Lithuanian–Belarusian Divisions, the (21st) Mountain Division, the (22nd) Volunteer Division.

=== Legions Infantry Divisions ===
Formation name	Date created	Date ceased to exist	Notable battle(s)	Polish name	Notes	Source(s)
1st Legions Infantry Division	21 February 1919	23 September 1939	Niemen River	1 Dywizja Piechoty Legionów	Formed from the 1st Brigade, Polish Legions.	
2nd Legions Infantry Division	21 February 1919	29 September 1939	Niemen River	2 Dywizja Piechoty Legionów		
3rd Legions Infantry Division	12 April 1919	8-9 September 1939	Brzostowica, Niemen River	3 Dywizja Piechoty Legionów		

=== Infantry Divisions ===
Formation name	Date created	Date ceased to exist	Notable battle(s)	Polish name	Notes	Source(s)
4th Infantry Division	16 April 1919	21 September 1939		4 Dywizja Piechoty	Later renamed 26th Infantry Division.	
5th Infantry Division	4 April 1919	September 1939		5 Dywizja Piechoty		
6th Infantry Division	9 May 1919	20 September 1939		6 Dywizja Piechoty		
7th Infantry Division	14 May 1919	September 1939		7 Dywizja Piechoty		
8th Infantry Division	9 May 1919	September 1939		8 Dywizja Piechoty		
9th Infantry Division	12 June 1919	September 1939		9 Dywizja Piechoty		
10th Infantry Division	2 June 1919	September 1939		10 Dywizja Piechoty	Formerly 4th Rifle Division (Poland) and the 2nd Brigade, Polish Legions.	
11th Infantry Division	16 September 1919	18 September 1939		11 Karpacka Dywizja Piechoty	Formed from the 2nd Rifle Division.	
12th Infantry Division	1 September 1919	September 1939		12 Dywizja Piechoty	Formed from the 6th Rifle Division.	
13th Infantry Division	9 September 1919	28 September 1939		13 Kresowa Dywizja Piechoty	Formed from the 1st Rifle Division.	
14th Infantry Division	10 December 1919	September 1939		14 Wielkopolska Dywizja Piechoty	Formed from the 1st Greater Poland Rifle Division, which was formed on 22 January 1919.	
15th Infantry Division	17 January 1920	September 1939		15 Wielkopolska Dywizja Piechoty	Formed from the 2nd Greater Poland Rifle Division, which was formed in March 1919.	
16th Infantry Division	5 March 1920	19 September 1939		16 Pomorska Dywizja Piechoty	Formed from the 4th Pomeranian Rifle Division, formed on 30 July 1919.	
17th Infantry Division	1 February 1920	September 1939		17 Wielkopolska Dywizja Piechoty	Formed from the 3rd Greater Poland Rifle Division, formed on 6 June 1919.	
18th Infantry Division	23 January 1920	13 September 1939		18 Dywizja Piechoty	Formed from Haller's Blue Army.	

=== Lithuanian–Belarusian, Mountain and Volunteer Divisions ===
Formation name	Date created	Date ceased to exist	Notable battle(s)	Polish name	Notes	Source(s)
(19th) 1st Lithuanian–Belarusian Division	26 November 1918	12 October 1921	Głębokie, Niemen River, Krwawy Bór	1 Dywizja Litewsko-Białoruska	The division was renamed the 19th Infantry Division on 12 October 1921.	
(20th) 2nd Lithuanian–Belarusian Division	21 October 1919	12 October 1921	Głębokie, Niemen River	2 Dywizja Litewsko-Białoruska	The division was created from elements of the 1st Lithuanian–Belarusian Division. On 12 October 1921, the division was renamed the 20th Infantry Division.	
(21st) Mountain Infantry Division	9 February 1920	16 September 1939		21 Dywizja Piechoty Górskiej		
(22nd) Volunteer Division	22 July 1920	November 1920		Dywizja Ochotnicza		

=== Mounted Division ===
Formation name	Date created	Date ceased to exist	Notable battle(s)	Polish name	Notes	Source(s)
1st Mounted Division	mid-July 1920	1924		1 Dywizja Jazdy	The division was renamed the 1st Cavalry Division in 1924.	

== Formations ==
The following units and named commanders fought in the Polish–Soviet War on the Polish side.

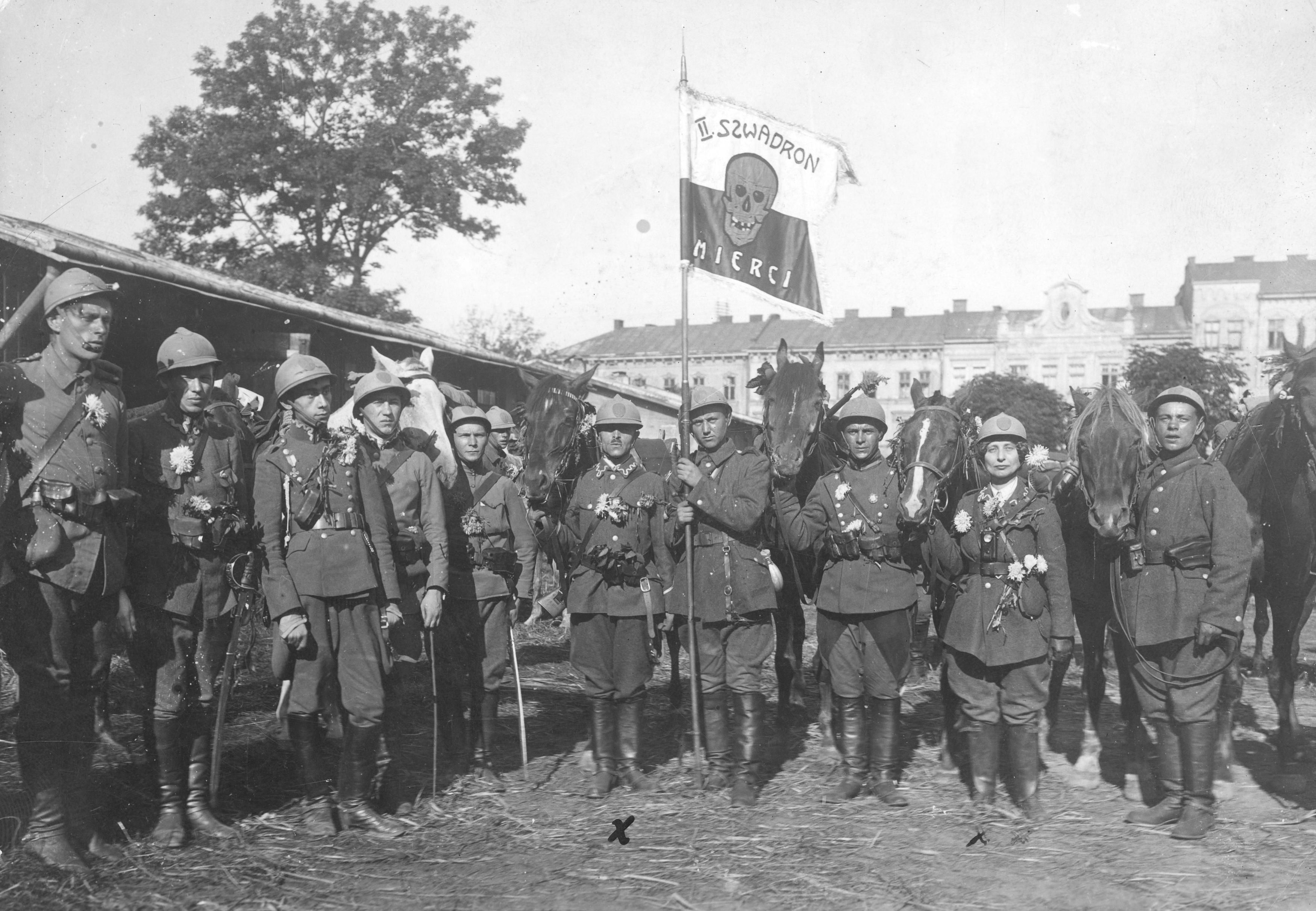
Polish volunteer so-called 'Death Squadron' (named unofficially) in Lviv, 1920.

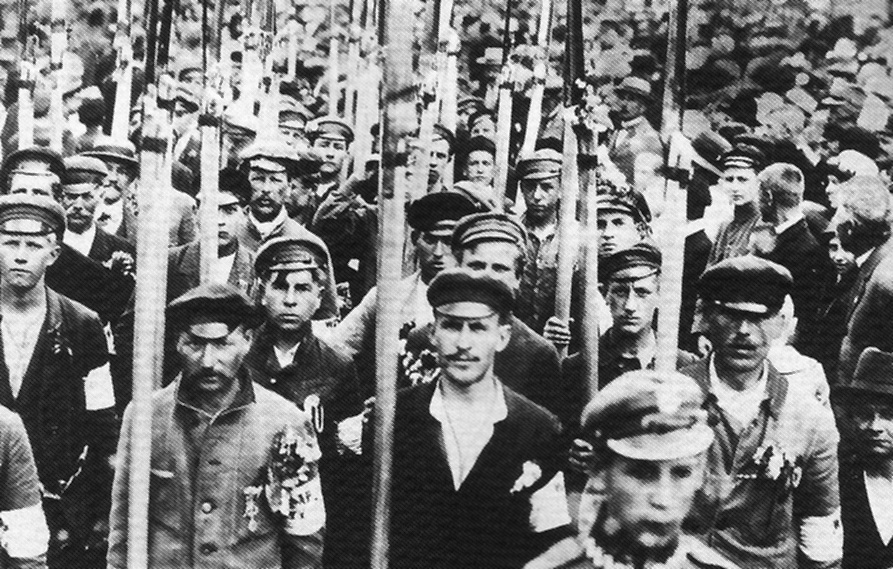
Scythemen (Kosynierzy), 1920

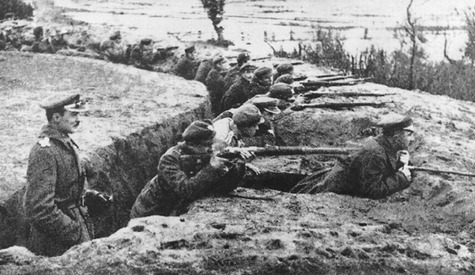
Battle of Niemen

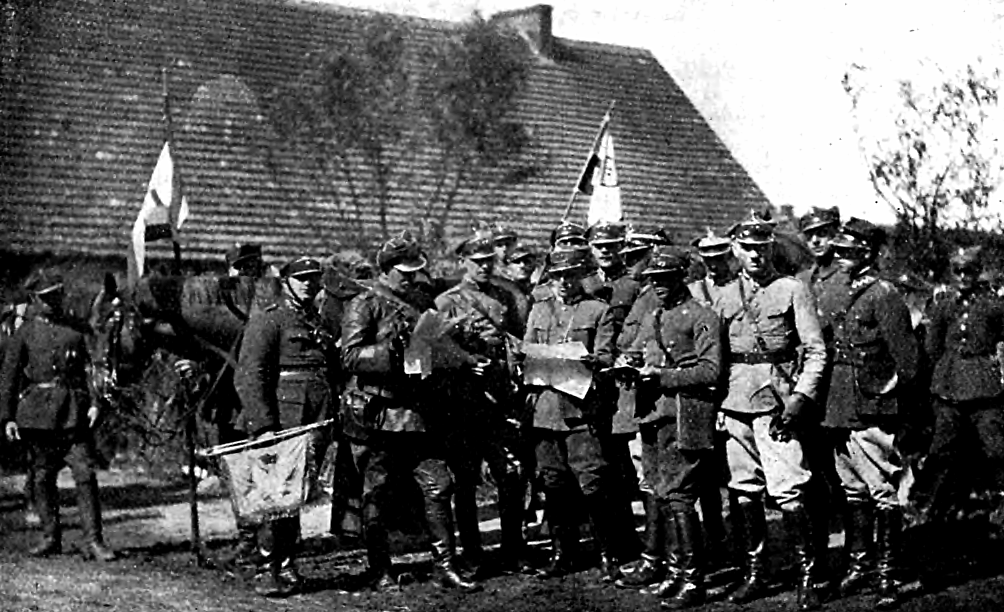
Command of Polish Regiment during Polish–Soviet war

- Polish Military Organisation
- Polish Armed Forces (1917–1918)
- Polish I Corps in Russia
- 5th Rifle Division (Poland) Polish 5th Siberian Rifle Division (Polish: 5. Dywizja Strzelców Polskich; also known as the Siberian Division or Siberian Brigade)
  - 1st Siberian Infantry Regiment under Franciszek Dindorf-Ankowicz; later renamed 82nd Siberian Infantry Regiment (Polish: 82. Syberyjski pułk piechoty).
  - 2nd Siberian Infantry Regiment under Józef Werobej.
- Individual Units/Regiments:
  - Polish Air Force
  - Polish Navy
  - Lwów Eaglets
  - Voluntary Legion of Women
  - 14th Infantry Regiment (Poland) (formed mostly of the former 90th Regiment of the Austro-Hungarian Army. 5th Company commanded by Antoni Chruściel)
  - 36th Infantry Regiment (Poland) aka Infantry Regiment of the Academic Legion
  - 49th Hutsul Rifle Regiment formerly 15th Infantry Rifle Regiment of General Haller's Blue Army. In September 1919 it was renamed to 40th Kresy Infantry Rifle Regiment and changed March 1920 to 49th Hutsul Rifle Regiment
  - Free Cossack Brigade formerly the Red Army 3rd Don Cossack Cavalry Brigade led by yesaul Vadim Yakovlev

== Order of battle in August 1920 ==
At the time of the Battle of Warsaw (1920), the Polish Army was organised in 3 Fronts and 7 Armies, in this manner:

- Northern Front (General Józef Haller):
  - 1st Army (Major general Franciszek Latinik)
    - 8th Infantry Division (Brigadier general Stanisław Burhardt-Bukacki)
    - 10th Infantry Division (Lieutenant general Lucjan Żeligowski)
    - 11th Infantry Division (Colonel Bolesław Jaźwiński)
    - 15th Infantry Division (Brigadier general Władysław Jung)
    - 1st Lithuanian–Belarusian Division (Lt. Gen. Władysław Bejnar)
  - 2nd Army (Maj. Gen. Bolesław Roja)
    - 2nd Legions Infantry Division (Colonel Michał Żymierski)
    - 4th Infantry Division (Colonel Stanisław Kaliszek)
  - 5th Army (Maj. Gen. Władysław Sikorski)
    - 9th Infantry Division (Colonel Aleksander Narbutt-Łuczyński)
    - 17th Infantry Division (Lt. Gen. Aleksander Osiński)
    - 18th Infantry Division (Lt. Gen. Franciszek Krajowski)
    - (22nd) Volunteer Division (Lieutenant colonel Adam Koc)
- Central Front (Marshal Józef Piłsudski):
  - Strike Group (Maj. Gen. Edward Rydz-Śmigły)
    - 1st Legions Infantry Division (Brigadier general Stefan Dąb-Biernacki)
    - 3rd Legions Infantry Division (Lt. Gen. Leon Berbecki)
    - 4th Cavalry Brigade (Colonel Gustaw Orlicz-Dreszer)
  - 3rd Army (Maj. Gen. Zygmunt Zieliński)
    - 6th Infantry Division (Lt. Gen. Mieczysław Linde)
    - 7th Infantry Division (Lt. Gen. Karol Schubert)
    - Don Cossack Brigade (Colonel Alexander Salnikov)
  - 4th Army (Maj. Gen. Leonard Skierski)
    - 14th Infantry Division (Lt. Gen. Daniel Konarzewski)
    - 16th Infantry Division (Maj. Gen. Kazimierz Ładoś)
    - (21st) Mountain Infantry Division (Colonel Andrzej Galica)
- Southern Front (Lt. Gen. Wacław Iwaszkiewicz):
  - 6th Army (Maj. Gen. Władysław Jędrzejewski)
    - 1st Mounted Division (Colonel Juliusz Rómmel)
    - 13th Infantry Division (Lt. Gen. Stanisław Haller)
  - Ukrainian People's Army (Symon Petliura, General Mykhailo Omelianovych-Pavlenko)
    - 1st Zaporozhian Infantry Division (Colonel Andrii Hulyi-Hulenko)
    - 2nd Volhynian Division (General Oleksandr Zahroskyi)
    - 3rd Iron Infantry Division (Colonel Oleksandr Udovychenko)
    - 4th Kyiv Infantry Division (General Yuriy Tyutyunnyk)
    - 5th Kherson Infantry Division (Colonel Andriy Dolud)
    - 6th Sich Rifle Infantry Division (Colonel Marko Bezruchko)
    - 1st Cavalry Division (General Ivan Omelianovych-Pavlenko)

== Bibliography ==
- Zaloga, Steven J. (2020). Cowper, Marcus (ed.). Warsaw 1920: The War for the Eastern Borderlands. Osprey Publishing. ISBN 9781472837295.
