= Volunteer Army (disambiguation) =

Volunteer Army may refer to:

- Volunteer military
- White movement, the anti-Bolshevik volunteer military during the Russian Civil War
- Volunteer Army, a counter-revolutionary military unit during the Russian Civil War
- Volunteer Force (Great Britain), the British volunteer military
- Volunteer Army (Poland), a volunteer outfit during the Polish-Soviet War
