= Battle of Przemyśl (1939) =

Invasion of Poland battle in WWII

- Part of Invasion of Poland
Date	11–14 September 1939
Location	Przemyśl, Lwów Voivodeship, Poland
Result	German victory

Belligerents
Germany	Poland

Commanders and leaders
(Nazi Germany) Unknown	(Second Polish Republic) Jan Chmurowicz

Strength
7th Infantry Division detachments from: 44th Infantry Division; 45th Infantry Division	7 infantry battalions 1 engineer company 6 heavy artillery platoons

Casualties and losses
Unknown	Unknown

The Battle of Przemyśl took place between 11 and 14 September 1939, during the German Invasion of Poland. The Polish Army garrison of the former Austrian fortress of Przemyśl (see Przemyśl Fortress) managed to halt the advance of the Wehrmacht for three days. The city surrendered on 14 September.

== Background ==
In the Second Polish Republic, Przemyśl was an important military garrison, with the headquarters of 9th Military District of the Polish Army stationed here (commandant: General Wacław Scaevola-Wieczorkiewicz). Furthermore, Przemyśl was home to the 38th Lwów Rifles Infantry Regiment, which was part of the 24th Infantry Division.

In the first days of the German Invasion of Poland, the 24th Infantry Division remained in reserve of Polish Commander-in-Chief. On 3 September it was attached to Operational Group Jasło, part of Karpaty Army. The division was loaded on trains, and transported to Tarnów and Dębica. In the second week of September 1939, the frontline approached the San river, which was defended by troops of General Scaevola-Wieczorkiewicz. His forces, however, were inadequate to defend an extended line, in addition the water level in the river was very low due to hot and dry summer of 1939, and the advancing Wehrmacht units were able to cross the San without difficulty. On 8 September General Kazimierz Fabrycy ordered preparation for the defence of Przemyśl. Polish forces in the city were commanded by General Jan Chmurowicz, his chief of staff was Major Michal Gulcz. Military commandant of Przemyśl was Colonel Mieczyslaw Sokol-Szahin.

On the night of 8–9 September, Polish soldiers manned two defensive lines. Two infantry battalions with 7 cannons defended the district of Zasanie, and their task was to keep their positions on nearby hills until forces of 11th Infantry Division, fighting the Wehrmacht near Dubiecko, reached the safety of the fortress. Second line of defence was temporarily manned by one infantry battalion. Road bridge over the San was ready to be blown up, while rail bridge was barricaded with freight cars and barbed wire.

Since the beginning of the campaign, Przemyśl was bombed by the Luftwaffe. On 7 and 8 September two raids brought widespread destruction and losses. On 8 September two platoons of anti-aircraft guns were brought to Przemyśl from Krosno and Sanok, but on 10 September both platoons were transported to Lwów.

== Battle ==
On 9 September, the evacuation of civil servants began. In the evening of that day, members of paramilitary organization Strzelec marched towards Lwów, and on 10 September the offices of 9th Military District were evacuated. Due to the chaotic situation in the city, the army was obliged to use military police to reintroduce order in Przemyśl. The situation was worsened by masses of refugees from western Poland and thousands of soldiers whose units had been wiped out by the Germans.

On the morning of 10 September, the German 4th Light Division reached the San near Radymno, and after a short skirmish with weak Polish forces, crossed the river. Next the Germans captured Jarosław, after a battle which lasted several hours. On 11 September, the German 2nd Panzer Division reached the area of Przemyśl, pursuing the Polish 10th Motorized Cavalry Brigade.

A motorized column of the 4th Light Division attacked Przemyśl, trying to capture the city by surprise. The attackers were repelled by Polish artillery, but the overall situation of Polish forces in the area of the city worsened, as in the south, motorized units of the 1st Mountain Division captured Dobromil, and its patrols approached Przemyśl on 11 September but failed to seize the city.

On the night of 11–12 September, General Jan Chmurowicz ordered an attack on German artillery batteries located in Kosienice. The raid was a failure, as the Polish soldiers, facing German machine guns, had to retreat. On 12 September near Bircza, the Polish 24th Infantry Division, commanded by Colonel Boleslaw Schwarzenberg-Czerny, engaged in heavy fighting with the 2nd Mountain Division. In the evening of that day, the Germans broke through Polish positions, forcing the 24th Infantry Division to retreat.

On 13 September, Polish heavy artillery was moved from Przemyśl to Mostyska, but along the way, it was bombed by the Luftwaffe. In the night, units of the Polish 11th Infantry Division managed to enter Przemyśl, after heavy fighting with the German 45th Infantry Division. The Polish soldiers rested in Przemyśl for a few hours, and in the morning of 14 September marched towards Lwów, leaving behind one infantry battalion with a battery of cannons.

On 14 September, the defenders of Przemyśl consisted of seven infantry battalions, a company of engineers, and six platoons of artillery. Altogether, these forces numbered several thousand soldiers. They came from different units, and in many cases did not even know what city they were defending. The German forces consisted of the 7th Infantry Division and elements of the 44th and 45th Infantry Divisions.

On 14 September in the morning, the Germans tried to capture the city in a frontal attack, but were halted by machine-gun and artillery fire. The main fighting took place in the south, where the Germans, after an artillery bombardment, crossed the San and attacked the village of Kruhel Maly, which now is a district of Przemyśl. After a Polish counterattack, in which bayonets were used, the situation there stabilized in the evening. In the north, German attacks also failed.

In the evening of 14 September, Colonel J. Matuszek, who commanded the defence of the city after General Jan Chmurowicz, was ordered by his superior, General Kazimierz Sosnkowski, to abandon Przemyśl and march eastward to Lwów. Polish units retreated towards Mosciska, blowing up bridges behind them. The next morning, the Germans entered Przemyśl.

== Przemyśl massacres ==
The four-day battle was followed by three days of massacres carried out by the German soldiers and police against Jews living in the city. In total over 500 Jews were murdered in and around the city, and the vast majority of the city's Jewish population was deported across the San River into the portion of Poland that was occupied by the Soviet Union.

== See also ==
- List of World War II military equipment of Poland
- List of German military equipment of World War II
