= Battle of Przemyśl =

Battle of Przemyśl may refer to:

- Battle of Przemyśl (1918), a struggle for the control over the city between the West Ukrainian People's Republic and the Second Polish Republic
- Battle of Przemyśl (1939), also known as the defence of Przemyśl, a battle in the Invasion of Poland

== See also ==
- Siege of Przemyśl, during World War I
