= First Polish Army (1920) =

1st Polish Army
- Active: March 7th, 1920 - September 1st, 1920
- Disbanded: September 1st, 1920
- Country: Poland
- Engagements: Polish–Soviet War: Warsaw; Niemen River

Commanders
- Notable commanders: Jan Romer; Franciszek Latinik

The First Army was a field army of the Polish Army that existed during the Polish–Soviet War.

In March 1920 the Headquarters of the Army decided to disband the Front HQs active until then and reform them into separate armies. The largest of Polish fronts, the so-called Lithuanian-Belarusian Front (otherwise known as the Northern Front) was split up onto three armies: the 1st, 4th and 7th. The new 1st Army was composed mostly of former Corps-sized operational groups of Generals Edward Rydz and Józef Lasocki. Initially the command of the new formation was given to Gen. Józef Haller de Hallenburg, but eventually he took command of a new Northern Front while the 1st Army was given to Gen. Stefan Majewski. Initially it faced the Red Army's 15th Red Banner Army under Avgust Kork.

The composition of the newly created army changed over time. At various times the units under Majewski's command included the 1st and 2nd Lithuanian–Belarusian Divisions, the 5th, 8th, 10th, 11th, 15th and 17th Infantry Divisions, as well as 1st and 4th Air Groups and two cavalry brigades (the 1st and 4th).

Also the post of commanding officer was occupied by a succession of generals. Majewski was succeeded by Gustaw Zygadłowicz (May - June 1920), then by Jan Romer (June 23–28, 1920), Mieczysław Kuliński (June 29–31, 1920), Władysław Jędrzejewski (until August 6), Franciszek Latinik (until August 22), Lucjan Żeligowski (did not assume command) and finally Gen. Aleksander Osiński (from August 23 until September 1, 1920). The chiefs of staff were Lt. Col. Adam Nałęcz Nieniewski (April and May 1920), Col. Jan Kubin (until June 1920) and Col. Franciszek Kleeberg.

Following the battle of Warsaw, the army took part in pursuit after the fleeing Russian forces and took part in the Battle of the Niemen River. However, its forces were gradually reassigned to smaller formations and by the end of August 1920 the only division under its command was the 8th Infantry. By August 20 the unit reached the Orzyc River near Krasnosielc and was disbanded, with the 8th Division withdrawn to Lesser Poland for regrouping.
