= 24th Infantry Division (Poland) =

Polish 24th Infantry Division (Polish: 24. Dywizja Piechoty) was a unit of the Polish Army in the interbellum period, which took part in the Polish September Campaign. The Division was created in 1921, and its first commandants were: General Jan Hempel (until 1926), General Wacław Scaevola-Wieczorkiewicz, Colonel Boleslaw Maria Krzyzanowski (until September 9, 1939), and Colonel Boleslaw Schwarzenberg-Czerny (in the final days of the September 1939 campaign). The 24th Division's headquarters were located in Jarosław, with some regiments stationed in nearby cities of Rzeszów and Przemyśl. It consisted of:

- 17th Infantry Regiment (Rzeszów),
- 38th Infantry Regiment of Lwów Rifles (Przemyśl),
- 39th Infantry Regiment of Lwów Rifles (Jarosław),
- 24th Light Artillery Regiment of King Jan III Sobieski (Jarosław).

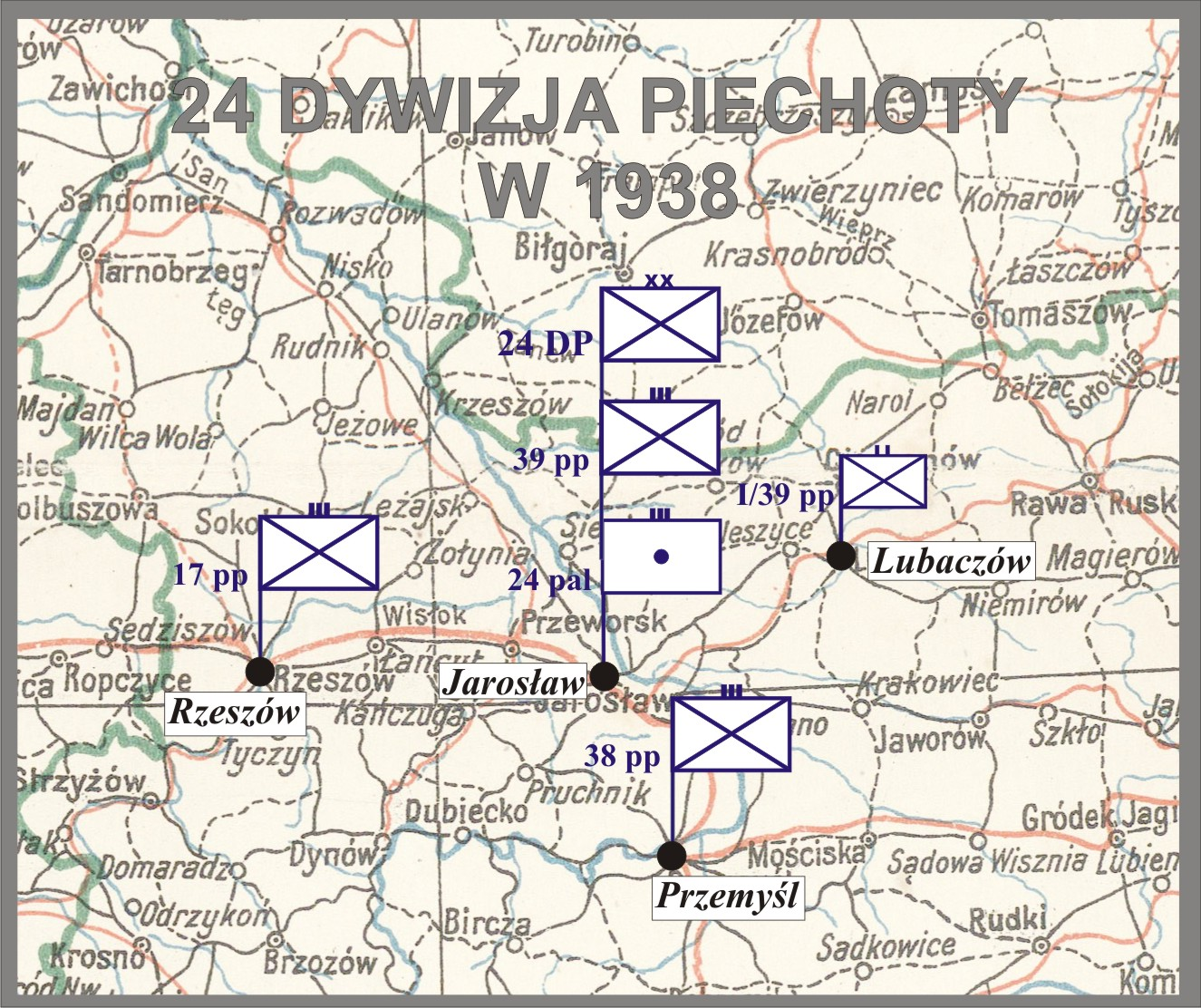
24 DP w 1938

== Polish September Campaign ==
The 24th Division, commanded by Colonel Boleslaw Maria Krzyzanowski, remained in the first days of the war in reserve. On September 3 transported to the area of Tarnów and Dębica, where it was supposed to man the line Pilzno - Szynwald - Tuchów. Attached to the Karpaty Army, on September 6 it was engaged in heavy fighting with advancing 4th Light Division of the Wehrmacht. In the evening of that day, General Kazimierz Fabrycy ordered the Division to withdraw towards the Wisłoka and defend the main west–east route from Kraków to Lwów.

On September 7, marching Polish units were ambushed by the Germans near Tuchów, who managed to destroy several battalions. After the attack, Colonel Boleslaw Maria Krzyzanowski lost his ability to command the Division and was replaced by Colonel Boleslaw Schwarzenberg-Czerny. Contrary to orders of General Fabrycy, the Division retreated further eastwards, towards the San.

Between September 11 and 12, 1939, the Poles were engaged in heavy fighting with German Second Mountain Division near Bircza. The Germans managed to break Polish positions in the evening of September 12, therefore southern wing of defence of Przemyśl was opened. Retreating towards Lwów, the 24th kept on repulsing German attacks, reaching Mosciska on September 15. Two days later, General Kazimierz Sosnkowski, who commanded Polish troops in the area, ordered all units to break to Lwów. First groups of Polish soldiers reached the besieged city on September 17 in the evening.

On September 18, when news of Soviet attack on eastern Poland reached General Sosnkowski, he decided to change plans. Instead of breaking to Lwów, Sosnkowski ordered the soldiers to form small groups and try to reach Hungary. Heavy equipment and vehicles were destroyed, and those soldiers who did not wish to fight any more, were let go. Meanwhile, units of the 24th were fighting 5th Panzer Division in the area of Rzesna Ruska. Soon afterwards, Soviet tanks appeared around Lwów, and General Sosnkowski decided to dismiss the Division, which ceased to exist.

== Operation Tempest ==
The 24th Infantry Division was recreated in the summer of 1944, during the Operation Tempest, as part of the Home Army.

== Sources ==
- Tadeusz Jurga: Wojsko Polskie : krótki informator historyczny o Wojsku Polskim w latach II wojny swiatowej. 7, Regularne jednostki Wojska Polskiego w 1939 : organizacja, dzialania bojowe, uzbrojenie, metryki zwia˛zków operacyjnych, dywizji i brygad. Warszawa : Wydawnictwo Ministerstwa Obrony Narodowej 1975.
- Czeslaw Grzelak i Henryk Stan´czyk: "Kampania Polska 1939"
- Janusz Piekalkiewicz: "Polen Feldzug. Hitler und Stalin zerschlagen die Polnische Republik"
- Ryszard Dalecki: "Armia KARPATY w wojnie obronnej 1939 r.", KAW Rzeszów 1989. ISBN 83-03-02830-8
- Stanley S.Seidner, Marshal Edward Śmigły-Rydz Rydz and the Defense of Poland, New York, 1978.
- Kazimierz Sosnkowski: "Cieniom Wrzesnia", MON Warszawa 1988, ISBN 83-11-07627-8.

== See also ==
- Polish army order of battle in 1939
- Polish contribution to World War II
- List of Polish divisions in World War II
