= Wacław Scaevola-Wieczorkiewicz =

Wacław Scaevola-Wieczorkiewicz (June 25, 1890 in the village of Polanowka near Lublin – December 7, 1969 in Geneva) was a General brygady of the Polish Army in the Second Polish Republic. He fought in World War I, the Polish–Soviet War and World War II.

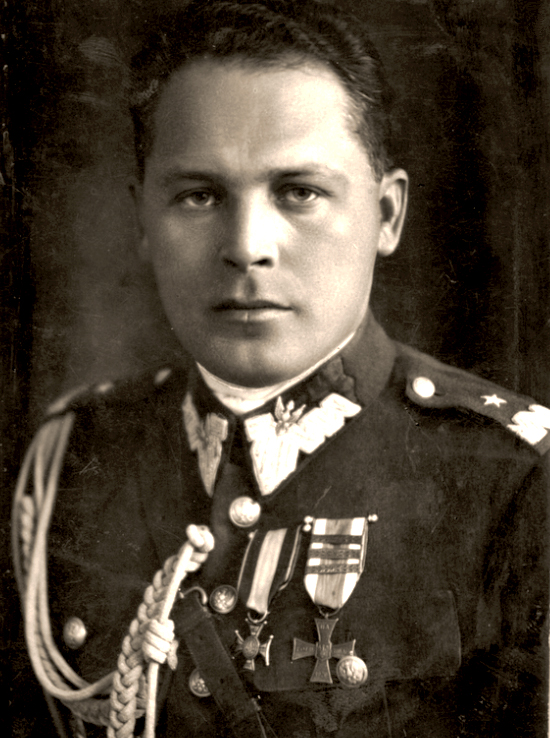
Wacław Scaevola-Wieczorkiewicz

Waclaw Wieczorkiewicz was born into a noble family of landowners. He graduated from Stanislaw Staszic High School in Lublin, and continued his education at University of Natural Resources and Life Sciences, Vienna. In 1911, he joined the Riflemen's Association, under nom de guerre Rene Scewola (later he changed his last name into Scaevola-Wieczorkiewicz, it was officially confirmed by the Voivode of Lwow, on November 7, 1931). In 1912, after completion of officer training, he was promoted to the rank of subcolonel (podporucznik).

From August 1914 until July 1917, Wieczorkiewicz fought in Polish Legions in World War I. Wounded after the battle of Marcinkowice near Nowy Sacz (December 5–6, 1914), he recuperated in a military hospital, and in 1915 was promoted to captain of infantry. After the Oath crisis, Wieczorkiewicz was imprisoned by the Germans at Fort Beniaminow. There, he organized a rebellion, and as a punishment, Scaevola was transferred to Werl Fortress.

In late 1918, Wieczorkiewicz joined the Polish Army, and was immediately promoted to Major. In November 1918, he created a unit of volunteers, which fought in the Battle of Lwow. From August 15, 1919, he commanded 9th Legions Infantry Regiment, with which he fought in initial stages of the Polish–Soviet War. By the end of this conflict, Wieczorkiewicz commanded 3rd Legions Infantry Division.

In 1921, Wieczorkiewicz was named commandant of Center of Army Training in Rembertow. In 1923, he was transferred to the 31st Kaniow Rifles Infantry Regiment, and during the years 1923 - 1925, he studied at a Military Academy in Paris. In June 1926, Wieczorkiewicz came to Jaroslaw, where he was named commandant of both 24th Infantry Division, and the Polish Army garrison of Jaroslaw. In 1927, he was promoted to General brygady.

Wieczorkiewicz actively supported various community organizations and development of culture at Jaroslaw. He was the local leader of the Maritime and Colonial League, honorary chairman of sports club Ognisko Jaroslaw, and an active supporter of the Riflemen's Association. Furthermore, he was chairman of Society of the Friends of Jaroslaw, and sponsored the renovation of its Benedictine Abbey. On June 23, 1937, City Council named him honorary citizen of Jaroslaw.

During the 1939 Invasion of Poland, Wieczorkiewicz commanded reserve units of Krakow Army and Karpaty Army. In 1940 he left the General Government, and reached France, via Hungary. After the Battle of France, he remained in occupied country, and was active member of the French Resistance. In 1943, he moved to Switzerland, and found a job at an insurance company. He died in Geneva on December 7, 1969, and was buried at the local Saint-Georges Cemetery.

In 1992, a street in Jaroslaw was named after him, and in 2010, 14th Artillery Regiment, stationed in Jaroslaw.

== Promotions ==
- Porucznik – 1914,
- Captain of Infantry – 1915,
- Major – 1918,
- Podpolkovnik – 1920,
- Polkovnik – 1920,
- General brygady – 1927.

== Honors and awards ==
- Virtuti Militari 5th Class,
- Commander's Cross of the Order of Polonia Restituta,
- Cross of Independence,
- Cross of Valour, four times,
- Gold Cross of Merit,
- Commemorative Medal for the 1918 - 1921 War “Poland to her Defender”,
- Medal of 10 Years of Independence,

== Family ==
On April 6, 1929 in Warsaw, Wieczorkiewicz married Janina née Awernatus. They had two children: sons Tomasz (born 1930) and Wojciech (born 1932).

== Sources ==
- Piotr Stawecki, Słownik biograficzny generałów Wojska Polskiego 1918–1939, Warszawa 1994, ISBN 83-11-08262-6.
- Henryk P. Kosk, Generalicja polska t. II M-Ż, Pruszków 2001, ISBN 83-87103-81-0.
- Z. Mierzwiński, Generałowie II Rzeczypospolitej, Warszawa 1995
- Zofia Kostka-Bieńkowska, Honorowi obywatele Jarosławia 1857-2003, Jarosław 2009

== See also ==
- List of Polish generals
