= Kruhel Wielki =

- Village
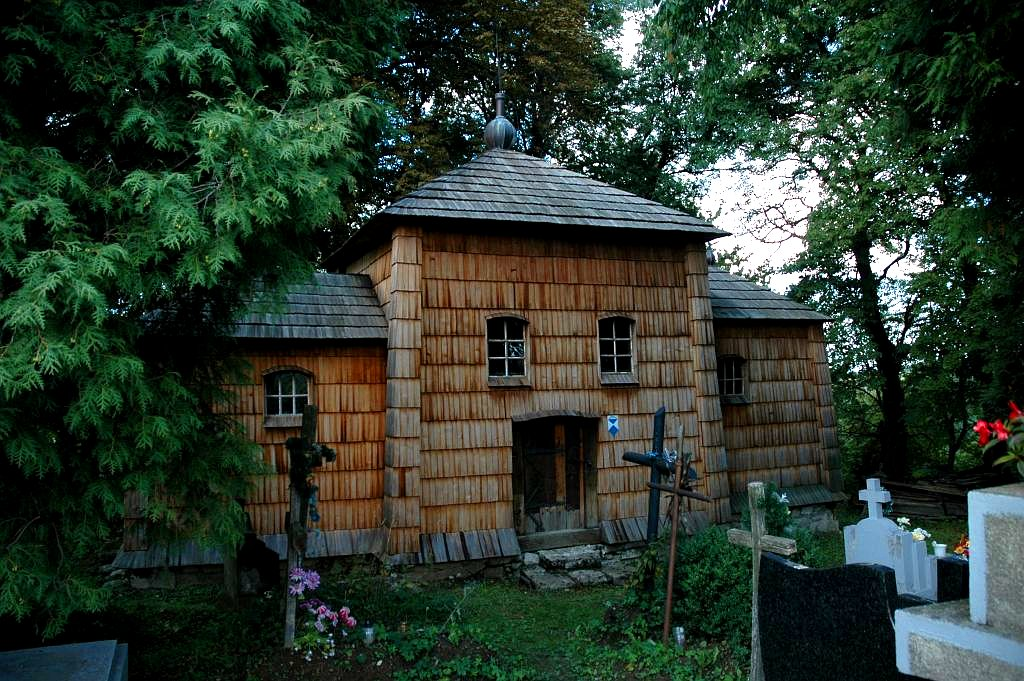
- Greek Catholic church

- Location within Poland
- Coordinates: 49°46′N 22°44′E
- Country: Poland
- Voivodeship: Subcarpathian
- County: Przemyśl County
- City: Przemyśl

Kruhel Wielki (Polish pronunciation: [ˈkruxɛl ˈvjɛlkʲi]; Ukrainian: Кругель Великий) is a part of the city Przemyśl, formerly it was a village in the administrative district of Gmina Krasiczyn, within Przemyśl County, Subcarpathian Voivodeship, in south-eastern Poland. The village was incorporated to Przemyśl on 1 January 2010. It lies approximately 5 kilometres (3 mi) east of Krasiczyn, and 61 km (38 mi) south-east of the regional capital Rzeszów.
