= 17th Infantry Regiment (Poland) =

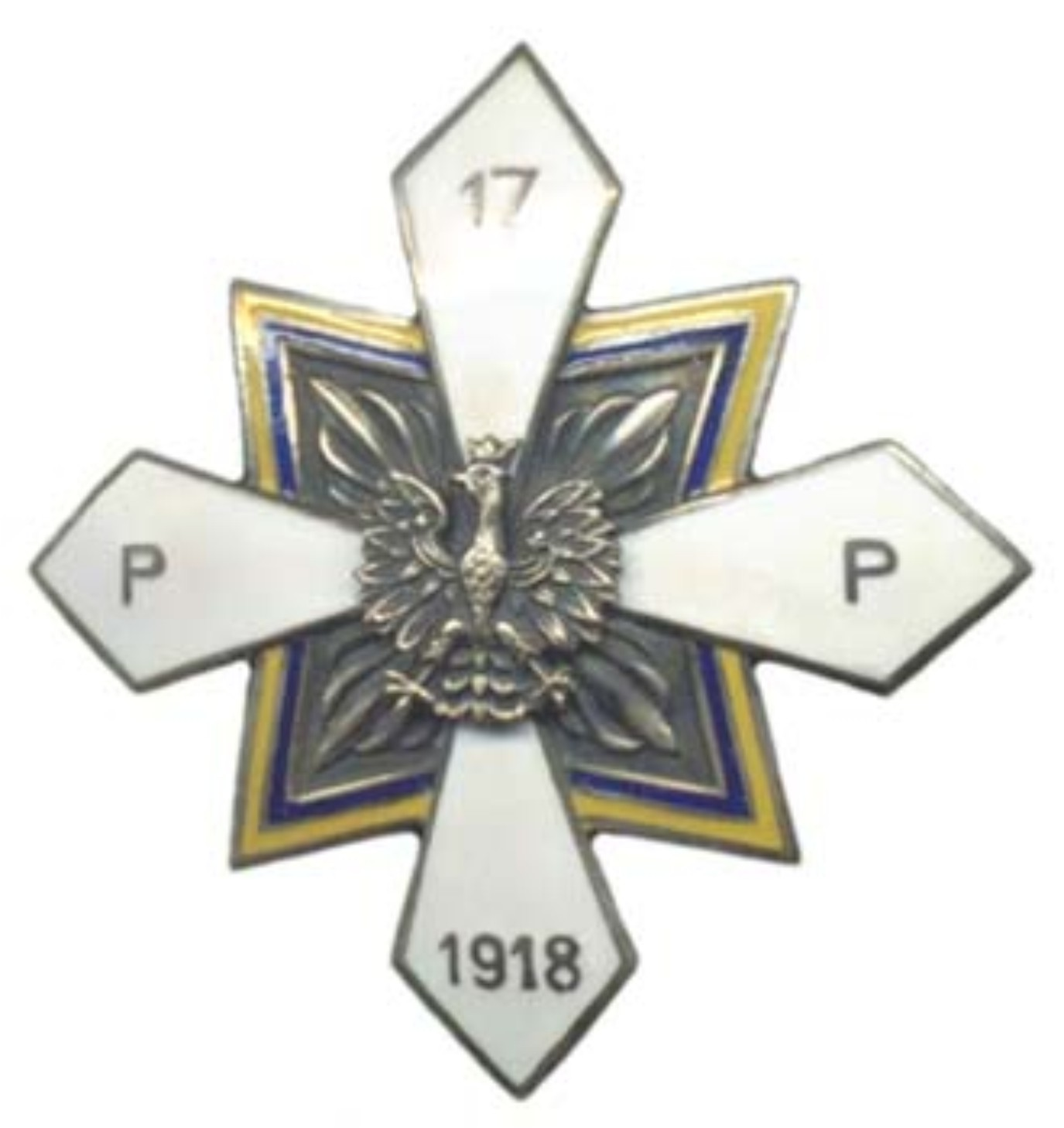

17th Infantry Regiment (Polish: 17 Pulk Piechoty, 17 pp) was an infantry regiment of the Polish Army. It existed from late 1918 until September 1939. Garrisoned in Rzeszów, the unit belonged to the 24th Infantry Division from Jarosław.

== Early history ==
On November 1, 1918, ethnic Polish soldiers, serving in Austro-Hungarian Army garrison at Rzeszów, decided to form their own unit. Reinforced with soldiers of the former Austrian 40th Infantry Regiment, and with volunteers from local population, the first battalion of the regiment was sent on November 17 to Lwów (see Battle of Lemberg (1918)). The second battalion, formed in late November, was sent in December 1918 to Przemyśl, (see Battle of Przemyśl (1918)).

In late December 1918, the regiment was reorganized. Two new units were formed out of it: they were named the 17th and the 18th Infantry Regiments.

In early 1919, the first battalion was sent to Volhynia, where in the night of January 22/23, it attacked Ukrainian positions in Włodzimierz Wołyński. In May 1919, the Ukrainians began a large offensive. After heavy fighting, the Poles counterattacked, managing to push the enemy back. Due to heavy losses, the battalion was in August 1919 transferred to the former Duchy of Cieszyn, where it guarded Polish-Czechoslovak demarcation line (see Polish-Czechoslovak War). In the autumn 1919, the regiment was sent to Wilno, and in early 1920, it joined the 6th Infantry Division near Minsk.

== Second Polish Republic ==
Following the Polish-Soviet War, the regiment returned to Rzeszów (December 26, 1920). It took former Austrian barracks of King Jan III Sobieski, and was included into the 24th Infantry Division. Most of its officers had previously served either in Austrian or Russian Army. The regiment celebrated its holiday on June 4, the anniversary of the 1920 battle of the Berezina river.

== 1939 Invasion of Poland ==
The regiment began its mobilization on August 30, 1939, and on September 3, it was transported to Gromnik, tasked with preparing defensive positions. On September 6 in the evening, the regiment for the first time clashed with the advancing Wehrmacht (4th Light Division), near Wroblowice. By midnight of that day, it was ordered to retreat towards Tuchów, and then behind the Wisłoka.

By the evening of September 9, the regiment reached Żyznów, and on the next day in the morning, it crossed the San river. It was then ordered to provide rear guard for the units of the 24th Infantry Division, marching towards Bircza. On September 12, the regiment reached the village of Borownica. Since it had already been captured by the enemy, Colonel Beniamin Kotarba decided to assault the Germans. After a bloody clash during which the Poles were unable to push back the enemy, the regiment was dispersed and its soldiers were ordered to try to reach Polish positions near Lwów. Colonel Kotarba himself was killed in action.

== Commandants ==
- Colonel Bronislaw Wilusz (1918),
- Colonel Maciej Puchalak (30 XII 1918 - VII 1920),
- Colonel Ignacy Oziewicz (1921–1925),
- Colonel Emanuel Jakubiczka (1925–1927),
- Colonel Wojciech Piasecki (1927–1929),
- Colonel Rudolf Kalenski (1929–1933),
- Colonel Stanislaw Siuda (1933–1939),
- Colonel Beniamin Kotarba (10 III – 12 IX 1939).

== Symbols ==
The flag of the regiment, which featured a Silver Eagle and the Black Madonna of Czestochowa, was handed to its soldiers on October 19, 1924, by General Stanislaw Haller. It was funded by the residents of the counties of Rzeszow, Mielec, Pilzno and Ropczyce.

The flag was buried in September 1939 by the soldiers of the regiment. In the summer 1944, it was found and handed over to the 17th I.R. of the Polish People's Army.

== Sources ==
- Kazimierz Satora: Opowieści wrześniowych sztandarów. Warszawa: Instytut Wydawniczy Pax, 1990
- Zdzisław Jagiełło: Piechota Wojska Polskiego 1918-1939. Warszawa: Bellona, 2007

== See also ==
- 1939 Infantry Regiment (Poland)
