= 10th Infantry Division (Poland) =

10th Division
- Active: 1919–1939
- Country: Poland
- Branch: Polish Army
- Type: Division
- Size: 3 regiments
- Garrison/HQ: Łódź, Poland
- Engagements: Polish–Soviet War; World War II

10th Infantry Division (10. Dywizja Piechoty) was a unit of the Polish Army during the interbellum period, which took part in the 1939 German Invasion of Poland. It was created in 1919 from the former Polish 4th Rifle Division. Stationed in Łódź and commanded in 1939 by General Franciszek Dindorf-Ankowicz, it was part of Łódź Army. Its task was to defend the fortified area along the upper Warta river, near the interwar border of Poland and Germany.

Since early morning of 1 September 1939, the Division was mercilessly attacked by the German Eighth Army, supported by aircraft and artillery. The Poles managed to keep their positions until 3 September, when they were ordered to withdraw towards Sieradz, and defend the river crossings. However, in the organizational and communicational chaos, the unit arrived at the destination several hours too late, after the Germans of the 17th Infantry Division had already crossed the Warta in some spots.

Soon afterwards, the 10th Infantry Division was attacked by the German 10th and 24th infantry divisions and after a bloody battle, it was defeated. Remains were gathered and ordered to withdraw towards Głowno and Zgierz. On 8 September, after several German attacks, the Division was scattered, a group of soldiers crossed the Vistula near Otwock.

== Order of Battle (1939) ==
- Division Headquarters – based in Łódź
- 28th Infantry Regiment Kaniów Riflemen (28 Pułk Strzelców Kaniowskich) – based in Łódź
- 30th Infantry Regiment Kaniów Riflemen (30 Pułk Strzelców Kaniowskich) – based in Warsaw
- 31st Infantry Regiment Kaniów Riflemen (31 Pułk Strzelców Kaniowskich) – based in Łódź and Sieradz
- 10th Light Artillery Regiment Kaniów (10 Kaniowski Pułk Artylerii Lekkiej) – based in Łódź
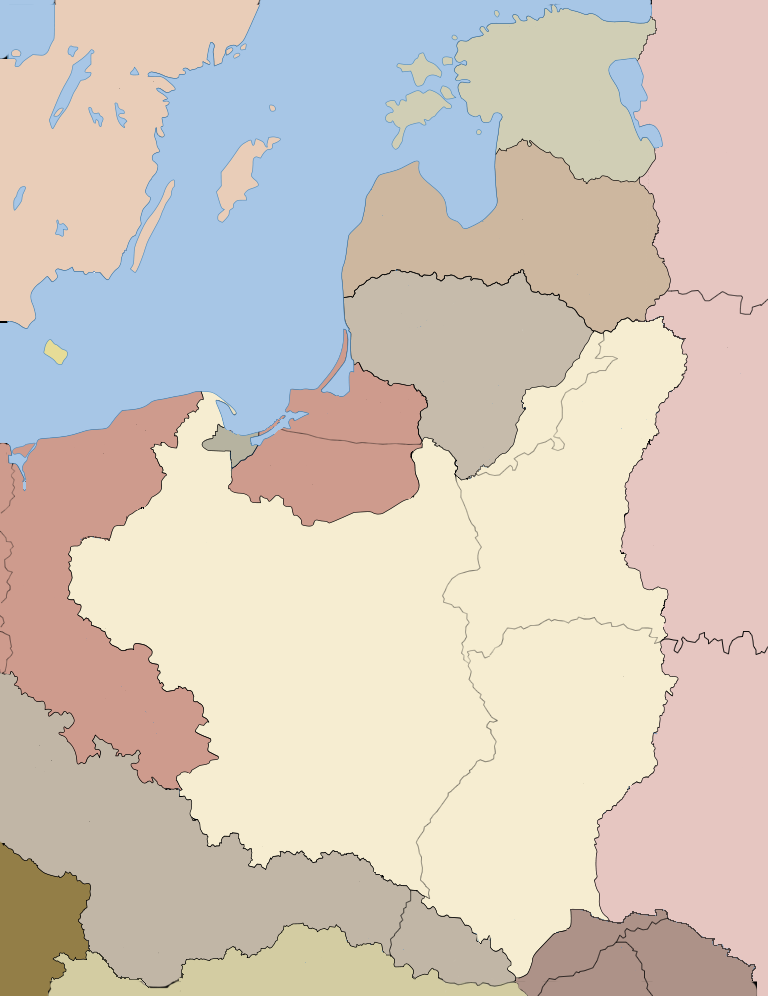
Peacetime locations of the 10th Infantry Division and its units in 1939.

== Later formations ==
There were at least three other Polish 10th Infantry Divisions formed during World War II and shortly afterwards. The first was a briefly-formed formation which was part of the Anders Army in the Soviet Union, but was disbanded before the Anders Army was evacuated through Iran to the West. The second was a Home Army formation. The third was another element of the Polish Armed Forces in the East, which formed part of the Second Army in 1944–1945. After the war it eventually became the 10th Armoured Division of the Polish People's Army in 1949–1950.

== See also ==
- Polish army order of battle in 1939
- Polish contribution to World War II
- List of Polish divisions in World War II
