= Władysław Jędrzejewski =

General of the Polish Army

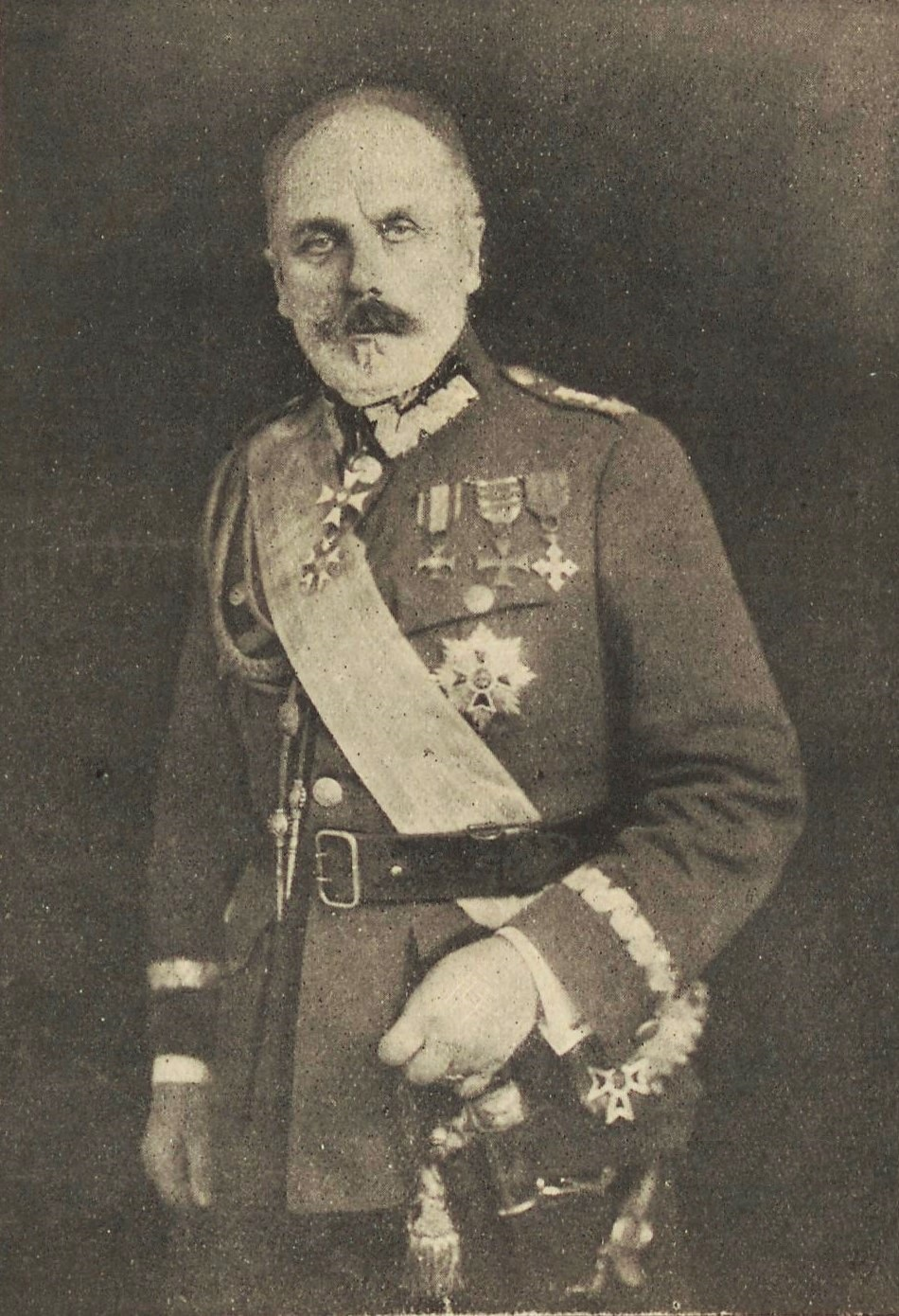
Władysław Jędrzejewski

Władysław Jędrzejewski (11 February 1863–1940) was a General of the Polish Army, who was probably murdered by the NKVD in Lwów, in March 1940. He fought in several conflicts, including World War I and the Invasion of Poland.

== Biography ==
Jędrzejewski was born on 11 February 1863 in his family’s real estate in Nowiny, located near Lepiel, Russian Empire (current Belarus). In 1884, after graduation from a Cadet School in Polotsk, he joined the 93rd Irkutsk Infantry Regiment of the Imperial Russian Army. As a professional Russian soldier, he fought in the Russo-Japanese War and World War I. In 1916, Jędrzejewski was promoted to major general.

In December 1918 in Warsaw, he joined the newly created Polish Army. In March 1919, Jędrzejewski was transferred to Lwów, where he commanded the defence of the city in the Polish-Ukrainian War. In August 1919, he became commander of the 5th Lwow Infantry Division, and on 21 April 1920 was promoted to colonel general. In May–August 1920, during the Polish–Soviet War, Jędrzejewski commanded the Polish First Army. In August–September 1920, he commanded the Polish Sixth Army, and then the Sixth Army Operational Group.

In September 1921, Jędrzejewski was transferred back to Lwów, becoming commandant of the Sixth Military District. On 3 March 1922 he was promoted to generał dywizji, and on 30 June 1924 was retired. Jędrzejewski settled in Lwów, and was named manager of the Association of Care of Heroes' Graves.

During the 1939 Invasion of Poland, Jędrzejewski, at age 76, volunteered for the army, and formed the Citizens Guard in Lwów. On 4 October 1939 he was arrested by the NKVD, and was shot either in late 1939 or in March 1940 (at the latter date he was aged 77). In 2012, he was reburied at the Polish Military Cemetery in Kyiv. His son, Captain Tadeusz Jędrzejewski, was killed in action during the Siege of Warsaw (1939).

== Awards ==
- Silver Cross of the Virtuti Militari (1921),
- Commander Cross of the Polonia Restituta (2 May 1923)
- Cross of Valour (Poland) (four times),
- Grand Cross of the Order of the Crown (Romania),
- Commander of the Legion of Honour.

== Sources ==
- Piotr Stawecki, Słownik biograficzny generałów Wojska Polskiego 1918-1939, Warszawa 1994
- Henryk P. Kosk, Generalicja polska, t. 1 (A-Ł), Pruszków 1998
