= 11th Infantry Division (Poland) =

The 11th Carpathian Infantry Division (Polish 11 Karpacka Dywizja Piechoty), was a tactical unit of the Polish Army in the interbellum period, which fought in the Invasion of Poland in 1939. Elements of the unit would go on to serve in the Polish Armed Forces in the East.

== Composition ==
Its headquarters were located in Stanisławów, with some regiments stationed in nearby locations, such as Stryj and Kolomyja. It consisted of these regiments:

- 48th Kresy Rifle Regiment, stationed in Stanisławów, commanded by Colonel Walenty Nowak,
- 49th Hutsul Rifle Regiment, stationed in Kolomyja,
- 53rd Kresy Rifle Regiment, stationed in Stryj,
- 11th Carpathian Light Artillery Regiment, stationed in Stanisławów,
- 11th Heavy Artillery Regiment,
- 11th Sapper Battalion,
- 11th Motor Battery of Antiaircraft Artillery,
- squadron of cavalry, made up of soldiers of Border Defence Corps from Zaleszczyki.

== Polish September Campaign ==
The division, under Colonel Bronisław Prugar-Ketling, was part of the Kraków Army as a rear unit. It was supposed to concentrate in the area of Zawiercie, to cover activities of the neighboring units - Polish 7th Infantry Division and the Slask Operational Group. However, original plans had been changed, because of the Luftwaffe bombing of Polish rail connections.

On September 3 and 4, parts of the division left train near Bochnia and was ordered to protect the line of the Dunajec river. Lacking artillery, antiaircraft and field hospital (which had been stuck in Rzeszów), the unit entered the battle immediately, but German pressure was too hard. On September 7, the division began retreat towards the Wisłoka and from there - eastwards, towards Przemyśl. There, on September 11 and 12, it was engaged in bloody fighting with the Germans. On September 17, the division fought in the Janów Forest, halting advance of German 7th I.D. and 57 I.D. Remnants of the unit, numbered at no more than 1000 men, managed to break into besieged Lwów, where it capitulated.

== Polish Armed Forces in the East ==
An 11th Infantry Division (see pl:11 Dywizja Piechoty (LWP)) was reformed became part of the Polish Armed Forces in the East. A 1944 formation of the division was originally intended to become part of the Third Army, which was never fully formed. After 1945 it became successively the 11th Motorised Division (1949), the 11th Mechanised Division (1950), the 11th Armoured Division (1963), and finally the 11th Armoured Cavalry Division in 1992, which still serves the Polish Army today. The 11th Armoured Cavalry Division is part of the 2nd Mechanised Corps.

== Bibliography ==
- Tadeusz Jurga, Wojsko Polskie. Krótki informator historyczny o Wojsku Polskim w latach II wojny światowej. 7, Regularne jednostki Wojska Polskiego w 1939. Organizacja, działania bojowe, uzbrojenie, metryki związków operacyjnych, dywizji i brygad. Warszawa, Wydawnictwo Ministerstwa Obrony Narodowej 1975.
- Piotr Zarzycki, Plan mobilizacyjny „W”. Wykaz oddziałów mobilizowanych na wypadek wojny, Pruszków 1995, ISBN 83-85621-87-3.
- Ryszard Dalecki: Armia „Karpaty” w wojnie obronnej 1939 r., Rzeszów 1989, wyd. II, ISBN 83-03-02830-8.
- Bronisław Prugar-Ketling, Aby dochować wierności. Wspomnienia z działań 11 Karpackiej Dywizji Piechoty. Wrzesień 1939, Wydawnictwo "Odpowiedzialność i Czyn", Warszawa 1990.
- Czesław Grzelak i Henryk Stańczyk, Kampania Polska 1939
- Janusz Piekałkiewicz, Polen Feldzug. Hitler und Stalin zerschlagen die Polnische Republik.
- Zarys dziejów wojskowości polskiej w latach 1864-1939, Wyd. WIH, Warszawa 1990.

== See also ==
- Polish army order of battle in 1939
- Polish contribution to World War II
- List of Polish divisions in World War II
