= 2nd Grochow Uhlan Regiment =

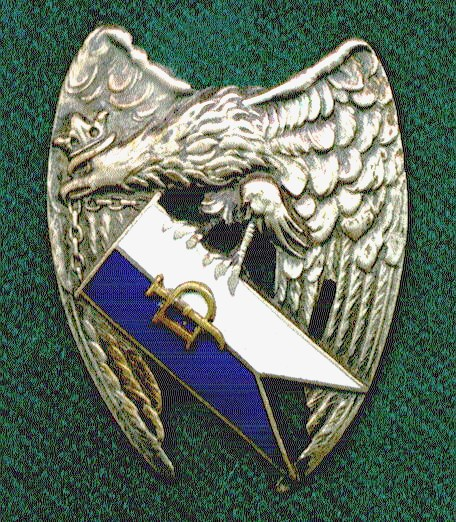
- Regimental badge
- Active: November 1917 – 6 October 1939; 1944 – 1945
- Country: Poland (1917-1939); Home Army (1944-1945)
- Role: Cavalry
- Engagements: Polish-Ukrainian War; Polish-Soviet War; World War II: Invasion of Poland; Battle of Grodno; Battle of Kock; Operation Tempest

The 2nd Grochów Uhlan Regiment of General Jozef Dwernicki (Polish: 2 Pułk Ułanów Grochowskich im. Generała Józefa Dwernickiego, 2 puł) was a cavalry regiment of Polish I Corps in Russia, Polish Army in the Second Polish Republic, and the Home Army during Operation Tempest (1944). The regiment was formed in November 1917 in Volhynia, and in 1921–1939, it was garrisoned in Suwałki, in the barracks of former Imperial Russian Army's 2nd Pskov Dragoons Regiment. In the 1939 Invasion of Poland it was part of Suwalska Cavalry Brigade.

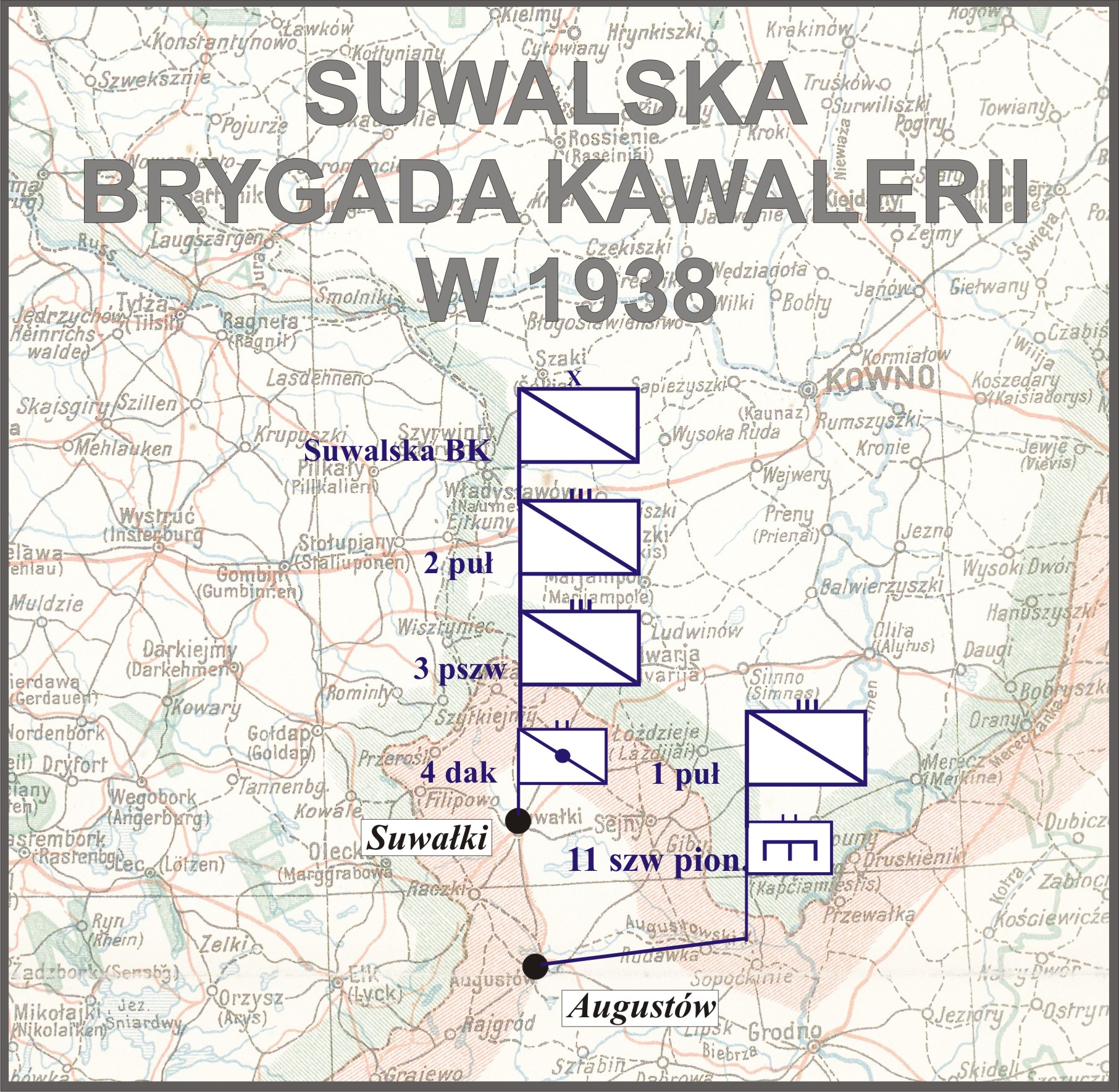
Suwalska BK w 1938

== World War I ==
Second Uhlan Regiment was formed in November 1917 in Antoniny, Volhynia, a village which at that time belonged to the House of Potocki. Soon afterwards the regiment joined Polish I Corps in Russia, and its two squadrons were made of ethnic Poles, who had served in Russian 2nd Guards Cavalry Division. First regimental order was issued on December 14, 1917, and in January–February 1918, the unit was strengthened by mounted artillery and third cavalry squadron. Since the number of soldiers increased, fourth squadron was formed in March 1918. By March 20, the regiment had almost 900 soldiers and officers. In early spring 1918, fourth and fifth squadrons were formed in Belarus. On May 30, 1918, the regiment had 47 officers, 4 clerks and 1091 soldiers.

In the first half of 1918, the regiment fought against bands of armed peasantry and Bolshevik groups. On February 23, it captured Starokostiantyniv, together with large stocks of food, weapons and ammunition. On March 23, the regiment began its march to Babruysk, to join main forces of Polish I Corps. Along the way from Volhynia through Polesie to Belarus, it fought both Bolshevik and German forces of the Ober Ost. The regiment was disarmed by Germans in May 1918, together with whole Polish Corps. Most of its officers and soldiers decided to march to Congress Poland.

== Second Polish Republic ==
Second Uhlan Regiment was recreated by Polish military authorities in November 1918. Its squadrons were located in Łódź, Łowicz and Siedlce, while the headquarters, commanded by Colonel Mieczyslaw Kudelski, were placed in Warsaw. In late 1918, the headquarters were moved to Kalisz, while its squadrons were stationed in Konin, Kutno and Włocławek. In 1919, the squadrons of the regiment were sent to different conflicts: 1st Squadron fought the Ukrainians and the Soviets in Volhynia and Polesie, 2nd and 3rd Squadrons fought in Polish–Ukrainian War in eastern Galicia, 4th Squadron was transferred to Podlasie, 5th Squadron at first fought the Czechoslovaks in Cieszyn Silesia, to be transferred to Galicia.

First to enter the battle was 4th Squadron, commanded by Rittmeister Kazimierz Zelislawski. In December 1918 it took part in clashes with retreating Germans in southern Podlasie. On February 6, 1919, together with other units it captured Brest Fortress, and then rail junction at nearby Zhabinka. The uhlans then marched eastwards, to Pinsk and Łuniniec. Meanwhile, 5th Squadron clashed with the Czechoslovaks at Lipowiec, Ustroń (January 30, 1919), and on February 27 entered Cieszyn. In March 1919 the squadron was transferred to Kalisz, and shortly afterwards, it fought the Ukrainians near Belz. 1st Squadron fought along rail line from Chełm to Kowel, as part of Operational Group of Edward Rydz-Śmigły. In June 1919 it joined the second regiment near Zamość.

In April 1919, 2nd, 3rd and 5th squadrons concentrated in northern Galicia, and clashed with the Ukrainians near Rawa Ruska. Next they moved to Polesie, and fought near Sarny. In late July 1919, three squadrons concentrated near Zbaraz, and spent the winter of 1919/1920 patrolling the border along the Sluch river.

In April 1920, the regiment, which was part of Third Cavalry Brigade, crossed the Sluch and engaged with the cavalry of Semyon Budyonny. In the summer it was moved northwards, and fought Soviet cavalry near Ostrołęka. On August 15, 1920, the regiment captured Ciechanów, and then chased after the retreating forces of Hayk Bzhishkyan. On September 1, 1920, the regiment was transferred by train from the area of Mława to Chełm, and joined Second Cavalry Division. In mid-September it captured Równe, and moved towards the Sluch river, behind the retreating Red Army.

In December 1920 Second Uhlan Regiment left border area and garrisoned at Włodzimierz Wołyński. In March 1921 it was moved to Włodawa, and in May of the same year the regiment was welcomed at Suwałki, where it remained until 1939.

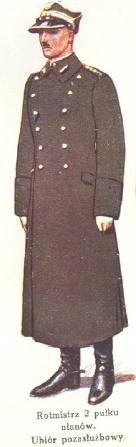
Rittmeister of the Second Regiment

== 1939 Invasion of Poland ==
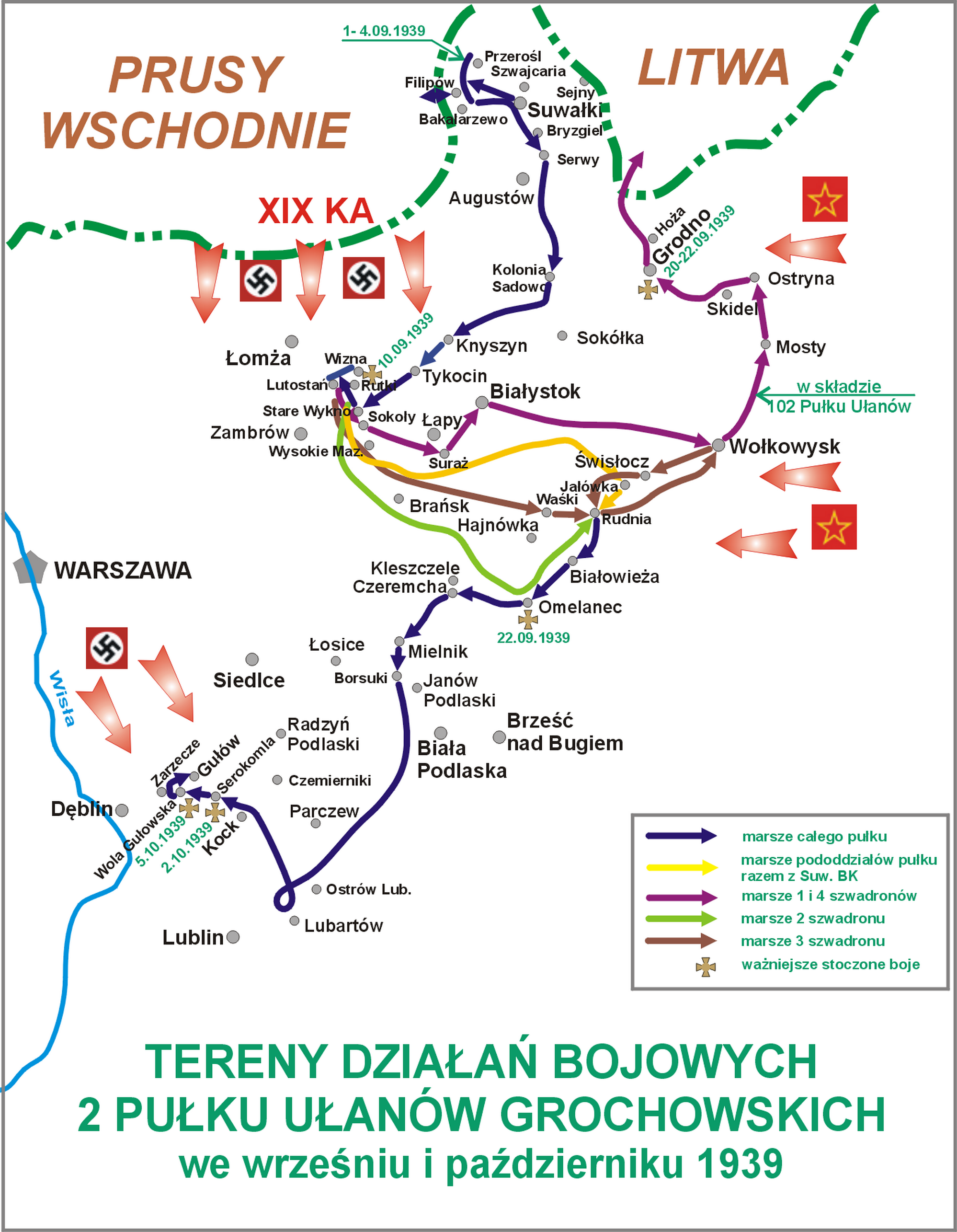
Second Uhlan Regiment in September 1939

The regiment, which was part of Suwalska Cavalry Brigade, belonged to Independent Operational Group Narew. Since September 1, 1939, it covered the area northwest of Suwałki. On September 2 the Germans seized Bakałarzewo, but Polish uhlans recaptured the town after a few hours. On September 3, the Wehrmacht attacked near Filipow, but was repelled. Second Regiment decided then to cross the border and enter East Prussia, reaching the village of Mierunksen (Mieruniszki).

On September 4, the regiment was ordered to move southwards. After two days, it reached Knyszyn. In the evening of September 7, General Zygmunt Podhorski ordered the unit to move to the forests east of Zambrów, and prepare defensive positions analog the Narew river.

On September 10, Colonel Karol Anders, who had replaced Colonel Kazimierz Plisowski, decided to advance to Rutki, where the uhlans clashed with the enemy. Since 18th Infantry Division was unable to keep its positions fighting against General Heinz Guderian's XIX Panzer Corps, Colonel Anders divided the regiment into two columns and retreat to Wolkowysk. After several clashes with the Germans, only 1st and 4th Squadrons managed to get to Wolkowysk, where they joined 102nd Uhlan Regiment. On September 20–22 they fought in the Battle of Grodno, after which 102nd regiment crossed the Lithuanian border on September 23.

Meanwhile, other elements of the Second Regiment, concentrated near Białowieża, joined the improvised Cavalry Division Zaza, which consisted of Cavalry Brigade Plis and Cavalry Brigade Edward. On September 21, the division moved southwards. Three days later, after capturing Mielnik, it crossed the Bug river. On September 29, Cavalry Division Zaza merged with Independent Operational Group Polesie, and the united force fought in the Battle of Kock. Last elements of the Second Regiment capitulated on October 6, 1939, and its soldiers were imprisoned at the Fortress of Dęblin.

== Operation Tempest (1944) ==
In the summer of 1944, the Second Uhlan Regiment was recreated by the Home Army Inspectorate of Bielsk Podlaski. The unit fought in the Operation Tempest in the area of Bielsk, Brańsk, Nurzec and Hajnówka. It consisted of some 600 soldiers, who protected local population and attacked German outposts.

== Commandants of the Regiment ==
- Colonel Wladyslaw Mosiewicz (1917)
- Colonel Stefan Suszynski (1917–1918)
- Colonel Adolf Mikolaj Waraksiewicz (1918 – 5 VI 1920)
- Colonel Wincenty Jasiewicz (5 VI 1920 – III 1930)
- Colonel Józef Smoleński (III 1930–1935)
- Colonel Jozef Koczwara (4 VII 1935–1936)
- Colonel Witold Cieslinski (1936–1937)
- Colonel Kazimierz Plisowski (1937 – 9 IX 1939)
- Colonel Karol Anders (9 – 12 IX 1939)
- Major Antoni Platonoff (12 IX – 6 X 1939)
- Major Mieczyslaw Walecki (1944)

== Symbols and Traditions ==
The flag of the regiment was funded in 1918 by the residents of Shepetivka. It remained in the regiment until the Invasion of Poland. On September 12, 1939, the flag was taken to Wolkowysk, to be later transported to Lithuania. Polish Attaché at Kaunas sent the flag in a diplomatic package to France, and finally it ended up in Great Britain.

Since 1927, all officers of the regiment had the right to wear a badge of Estonian First Hussar Regiment, due to a mutual alliance of both units.

The regiment had its own żurawiejka: "Uhlan Regiment of Grochów tends to its problems with a shot-glass. Lampas made of trousers, coat made of rags, this is the 2nd Uhlan Regiment. The sotnias of Budyonny will remember the Regiment of Dwernicki Uhlans".

In the interbellum period, the regiment sent its newly promoted officers to the tomb of its patron, General Józef Dwernicki, located in Lopatyn near Brody (current Ukraine).

In 1995–2000, the traditions of Second Uhlan Regiment were continued by 2nd Tank Battalion of 4th Suwałki Armored Cavalry Brigade from Orzysz. In 2003, Association of Grochów Uhlans of General Dwernicki was founded in Podkowa Leśna.

== Sources ==
- Adam Dobroński: 2 Pułk Ułanów Grochowskich im. gen. Józefa Dwernickiego. Pruszków: Ajaks, 1993
- Henryk Smaczny Księga Kawalerii Polskiej 1914–1947 Rodowody – Barwa – Broń wyd. TESCO Warszawa 1989
- Cezary Leżański Zostały tylko ślady podków... wyd. Książka i Wiedza Warszawa 1984 ISBN

== See also ==
- 1st Krechowce Uhlan Regiment
- 9th Regiment of Lesser Poland Uhlans
