= Stefan Kossecki =

Polish officer (1889–1940)

Stefan Kossecki (November 27, 1889 – 1940) was a soldier of the Imperial Russian Army, and Colonel of Infantry of the Polish Army in the Second Polish Republic. Captured by the Soviets in 1939, he was killed by the NKVD in 1940. In 1964, Kossecki was posthumously promoted to Generał brygady.

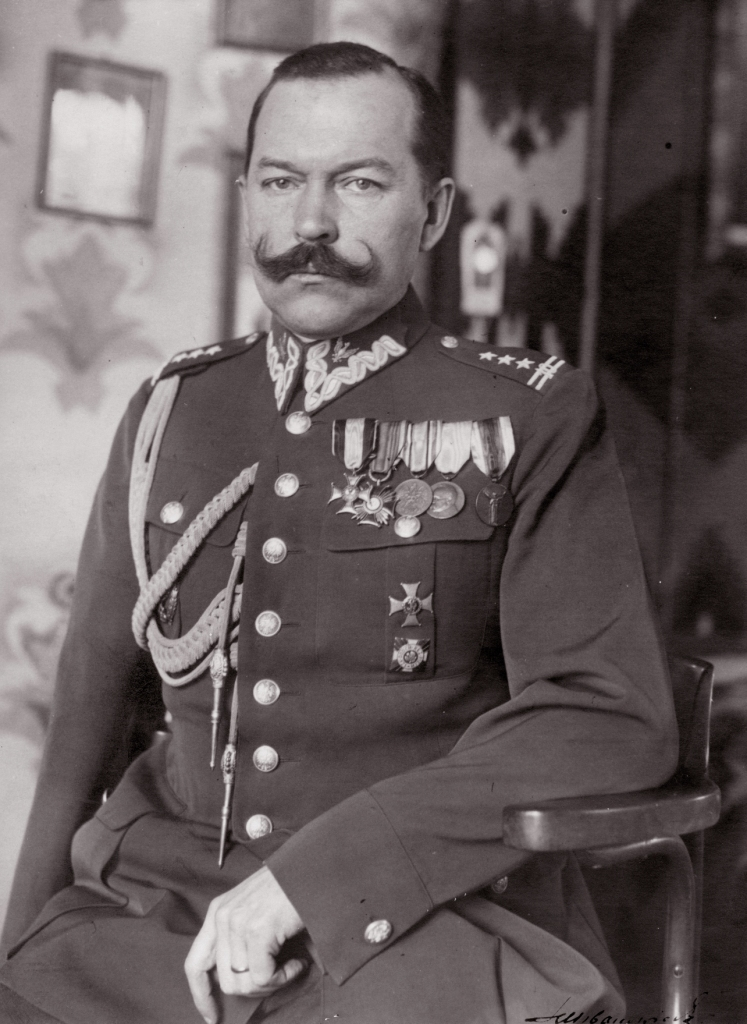
Stefan Kossecki 1931

== Early years ==
Kossecki was born on November 27, 1889, in a Polish noble family (Rawa coat of arms), in the village of Sawince near Kamieniec Podolski, Russian Empire. He was baptised as a Roman Catholic on January 12, 1890. While attending high school in Kamieniec, Kossecki was a member of the secret Polish patriotic organization "Association of Polish Youth", later joining the Union of Active Struggle, which was active in nearby Austrian Galicia.

After graduation in 1911, he joined the Imperial Russian Army's 13th Foot Rifles Regiment, which was subordinate to Grand Duke Nicholas Nikolaevich. In 1912, Kossecki was promoted to Chorąży.

== World War I ==
After the outbreak of World War I, he fought in the 284th Infantry Regiment. On January 8, 1915, Kossecki was severely wounded during the campaign in Bukovina. He lost his right hand and was sent to hospital. After one year, Kossecki returned to service at his own request. Promoted to Stabskapitan, he was awarded the Golden Sword of the Order of St. George.

In late 1917, while in Odessa, Kossecki joined the 7th Regiment of Polish Rifles. He was responsible for eliminating pro-Bolshevik elements among the unit's volunteers. He later joined the Polish I Corps in Russia, commanded by General Józef Dowbor-Muśnicki, and fought the Red Army in Belarus. For his actions in the Battle of Rahachow (February 1918), in which his company repelled a Bolshevik regiment of Latvians, he was awarded the Silver Cross of the Virtuti Militari in 1922. After the Polish I Corps in Russia was disarmed by the Germans, Kossecki went to the former Congress Poland.

== Second Polish Republic ==
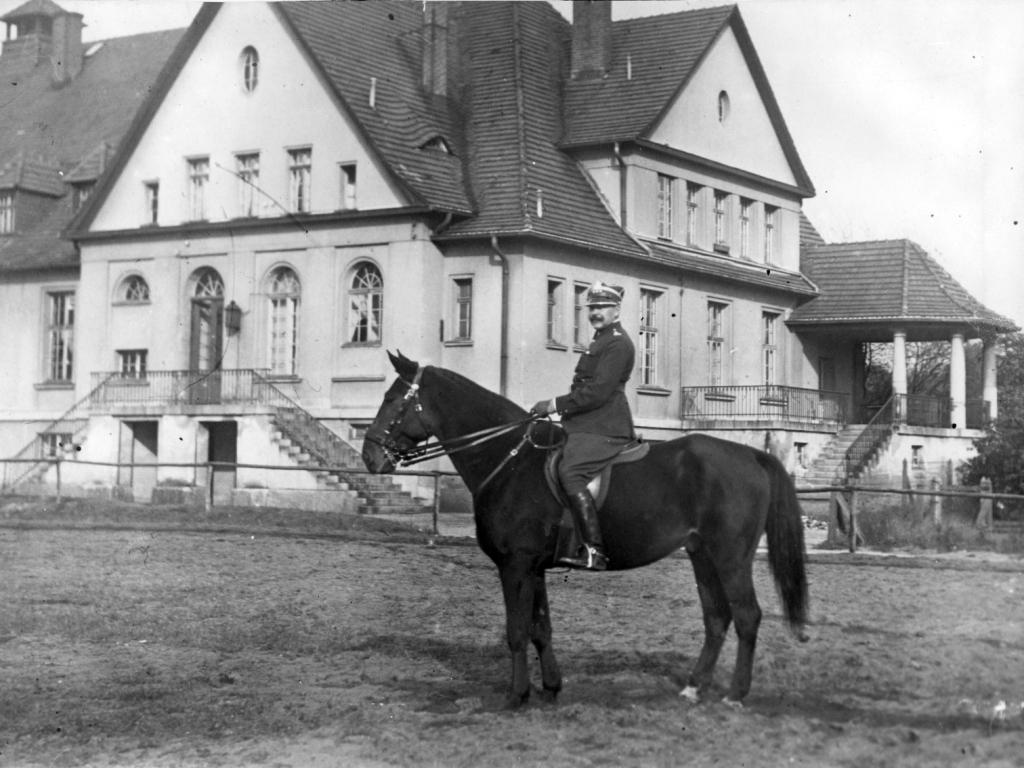
Col. Stefan Kossecki on horseback; Bydgoszcz 1934

On November 1, 1918, in Warsaw, Kossecki joined the newly established Polish Army and helped to open the Ministry of Military Affairs. In 1919, he was sent to the Officer School in Poznań, where he lectured. In August 1920, during the Polish–Soviet War, Kossecki fought the Soviets in the area of Toruń.

In 1923–24, he lectured at an NCO school in Bydgoszcz, and on November 3, 1924, Kossecki began studies at the Wyższa Szkoła Wojenna in Warsaw. After graduating in 1926, he was promoted to the rank of Officer of the Polish General Staff, and Marshal Józef Piłsudski sent him to the Army Inspectorate in Toruń. In 1928, Kossecki was named commandant of the 10th Infantry Regiment from Łowicz, where he remained until 1930. In 1930–1934, he lectured at military schools in Zambrów and Bydgoszcz. In 1931, he married Jadwiga née Zaremba, and in 1936 their son Jozef was born.

In 1934, Stefan Kossecki participated in the last military exercise commanded by Józef Piłsudski, and was honored by the Marshal, together with Colonel Stanisław Maczek. On January 25, 1935, he was promoted to commandant of infantry of the 25th Infantry Division (Kalisz), where he remained until July 1939. On August 20, 1939, Kossecki was named commandant of the 18th Infantry Division (Łomża), which in September 1939 belonged to Independent Operational Group Narew.

== 1939 Invasion of Poland ==
During the September 1939 Campaign, Kossecki fought in the area of Zambrów against the Panzer Corps of General Heinz Guderian. On September 12, near Andrzejewo, he was seriously wounded when five German bullets hit him during a charge that he personally led. Kossecki was taken to the hospital at Zambrów, and then to Białystok, a city that was occupied by the Red Army in late September. After leaving hospital in November 1939, he attempted to cross the newly established Soviet–German demarcation line, but was captured by the NKVD near Brześć nad Bugiem.

== Death ==
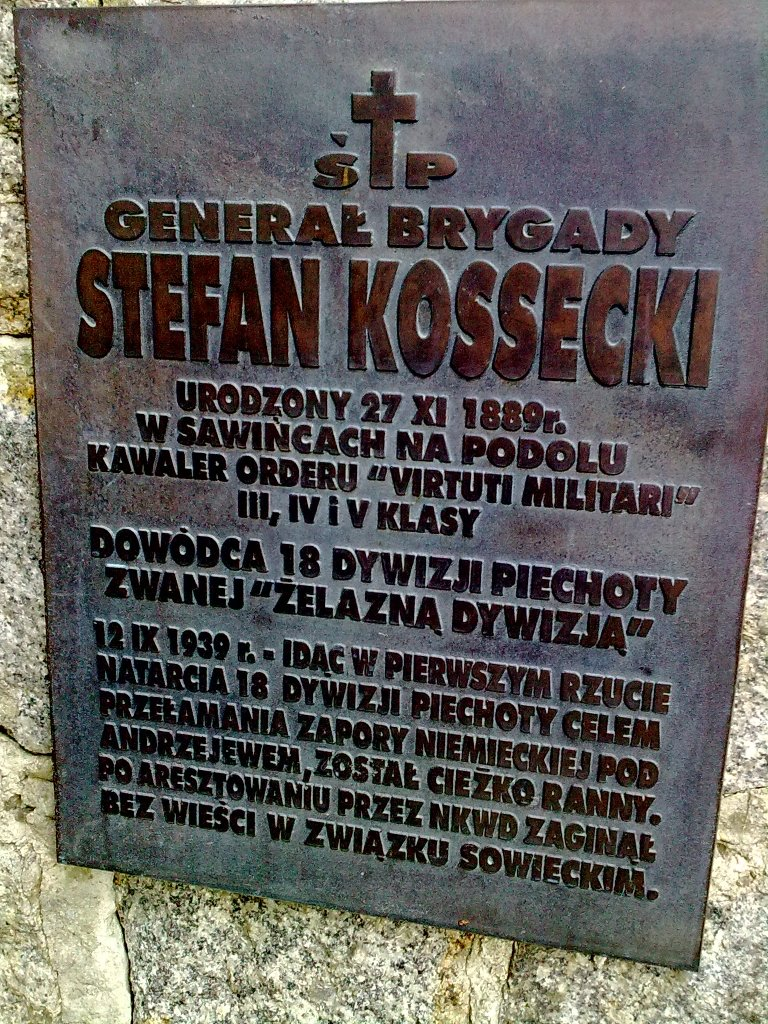
Epitaph of Stefan Kossecki in the Mausoleum of the 18th Infantry Division in Andrzejewo

Until March 28, 1940, Kossecki was held in a Soviet prison at Brześć. His subsequent fate is unknown; according to one witness, the Soviets drowned him in the White Sea together with other Polish prisoners of war. His symbolic tomb is located in the mausoleum of the 18th Infantry Division in Andrzejewo.

In 1964 in London, General Władysław Anders posthumously promoted Stefan Kossecki to Generał brygady. This decision was confirmed on November 9, 2004, by President Aleksander Kwaśniewski. On April 5, 1997, the 2nd Regiment of the Vistula Army Unit from Czerwony Bór was named after General Kossecki. On January 25, 2008, a street in Zambrów was named after him.

== Awards ==
- Gold Cross of the Virtuti Militari,
- Silver Cross of the Virtuti Militari,
- Officer Cross of the Polonia Restituta,
- Cross of Independence,
- Gold Cross of Merit (Poland),
- Golden Sword of the Order of St. George

== Sources ==
- H. P. Kosk, Generalicja Polska, Popularny słownik biograficzny. t. I. A-Ł, Oficyna Wydawnicza AJAKS, Pruszków 1998, s. 248.
- T. Kryska-Karski, S. Żurakowski, Generałowie Polski niepodległej, Wyd. II uzupełnione i poprawione, Editions Spotkania, Warszawa 1991.
- J. Leskiewiczowa (red.) Ziemianie polscy XX wieku. Słownik biograficzny. Część 7, Wyd. DiG, Warszawa 2004.
