= Cavalry Division Zaza =

Cavalry unit of the Polish Army

The Cavalry Division Zaza was a cavalry unit of the Polish Army, which was formed on September 18, 1939, during the Invasion of Poland. The division, commanded by General Zygmunt Podhorski (nom de guerre “Zaza”), was formed in Bialowieza Forest out of units of Podlaska Cavalry Brigade and Suwalska Cavalry Brigade, which had escaped German encirclement near Zambrow and Ostrow Mazowiecka.

Following the order of General Podhorski, the division headed southwards, to join other Polish forces fighting around Lublin. After a few days, it reached forests along the Nurzec. On September 24, 1939, the division began crossing the Bug river. It achieved this in the night of September 24/25, after heavy fighting with the Wehrmacht. On September 25 in the afternoon, Podhorski's forces bypassed Biala Podlaska, and three days later it was ordered to join Independent Operational Group Polesie under General Franciszek Kleeberg. As part of the Polesie Group, Cavalry Division “Zaza” took part in final battle of the campaign, the Battle of Kock (1939). It capitulated on October 5 near Wola Gulowska.

== Sources ==
- Ludwik Głowacki, Działania wojenne na Lubelszczyźnie w roku 1939, Wydawnictwo Lubelskie, wyd. II, Warszawa 1986, ISBN 83-222-0377-2

== See also ==
- Polish army order of battle in 1939
- Polish contribution to WWII
