= Krynki =

- Town
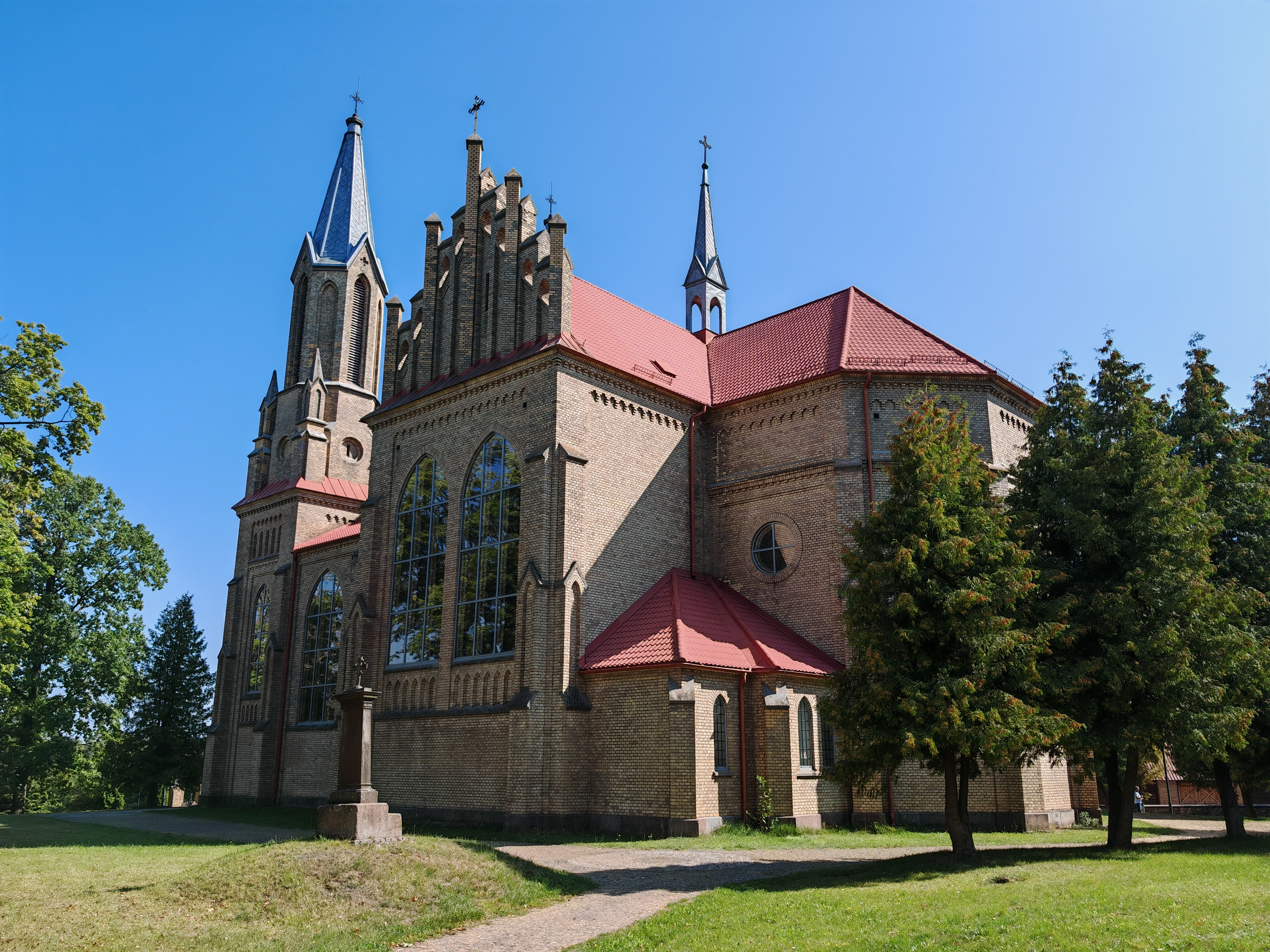
- Saint Anne church in Krynki

- Flag Coat of arms
- Interactive map of Krynki
- Location within Poland
- Coordinates: 53°15′56″N 23°46′20″E
- Country: Poland
- Voivodeship: Podlaskie
- County: Sokółka
- Gmina: Krynki

Population (2016)
  - Total: 2,470
- Time zone: UTC+1 (CET)
  - Summer (DST): UTC+2 (CEST)
- Vehicle registration: BSK
- Website: krynki.pl

Krynki pronounced [ˈkrɨŋkʲi] (Note: Belarusian: Крынкі, romanized: Krynki) is a town in northeastern Poland, located in Sokółka County in Podlaskie Voivodeship near the border with Belarus.

== History ==
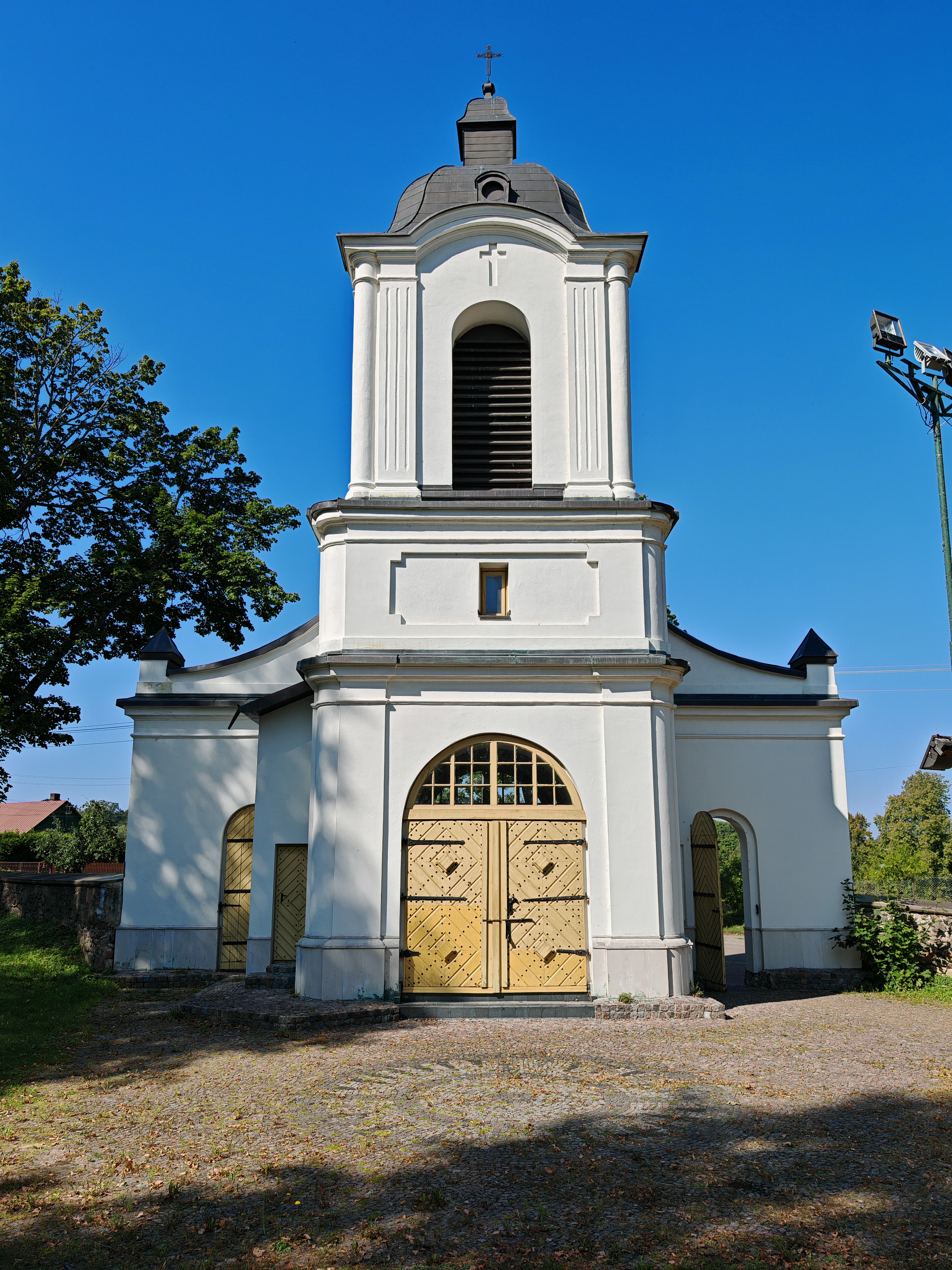
18th-century bell tower

Krynki was located on an important route connecting Kraków with Grodno, and a royal residence was built there before 1429. In 1434, Polish King Władysław II Jagiełło and Lithuanian Duke Sigismund Kęstutaitis met in Krynki, and renewed and strengthened the Polish–Lithuanian union. Krynki received town privileges before 1518. In 1522, King Sigismund I the Old founded the parish church of Saint Anne. Throughout history, Krynki was an important textile, leather and pottery center. King Charles XII of Sweden stopped in Krynki in 1706 during the Swedish invasion of Poland.

Following the Partitions of Poland, Krynki was annexed by Russia. Following World War I, Poland regained independence and control of the town. According to the 1921 census, the town had a population of 5,206, 65.3% Jewish, 20.8% Polish and 13.5% Belarusian.

During the joint German-Soviet invasion of Poland, which started World War II in September 1939, the Polish 13th Observation Escadrille operated from Krynki. Afterwards, Krynki was occupied by the Soviet Union until 1941 and by Germany after Operation Barbarossa. The local Jewish population was persecuted by the Germans during the Holocaust (for more information see The Holocaust below). In 1944, the German occupation ended and the town was restored to Poland, although with a Soviet-installed communist regime, which stayed in power until the Fall of Communism in the 1980s. The Polish anti-communist resistance was active in Krynki, and in 1945–1947, it carried out two raids on the local communist police station.

Krynki lost city rights in 1950 in communist Poland due to significant loss of population, but regained them in 2009. Today, the majority of Krynki's citizens are Catholic, specifically Polish, but there is also a significant Belarusian minority, who are Orthodox.

== Jewish heritage ==
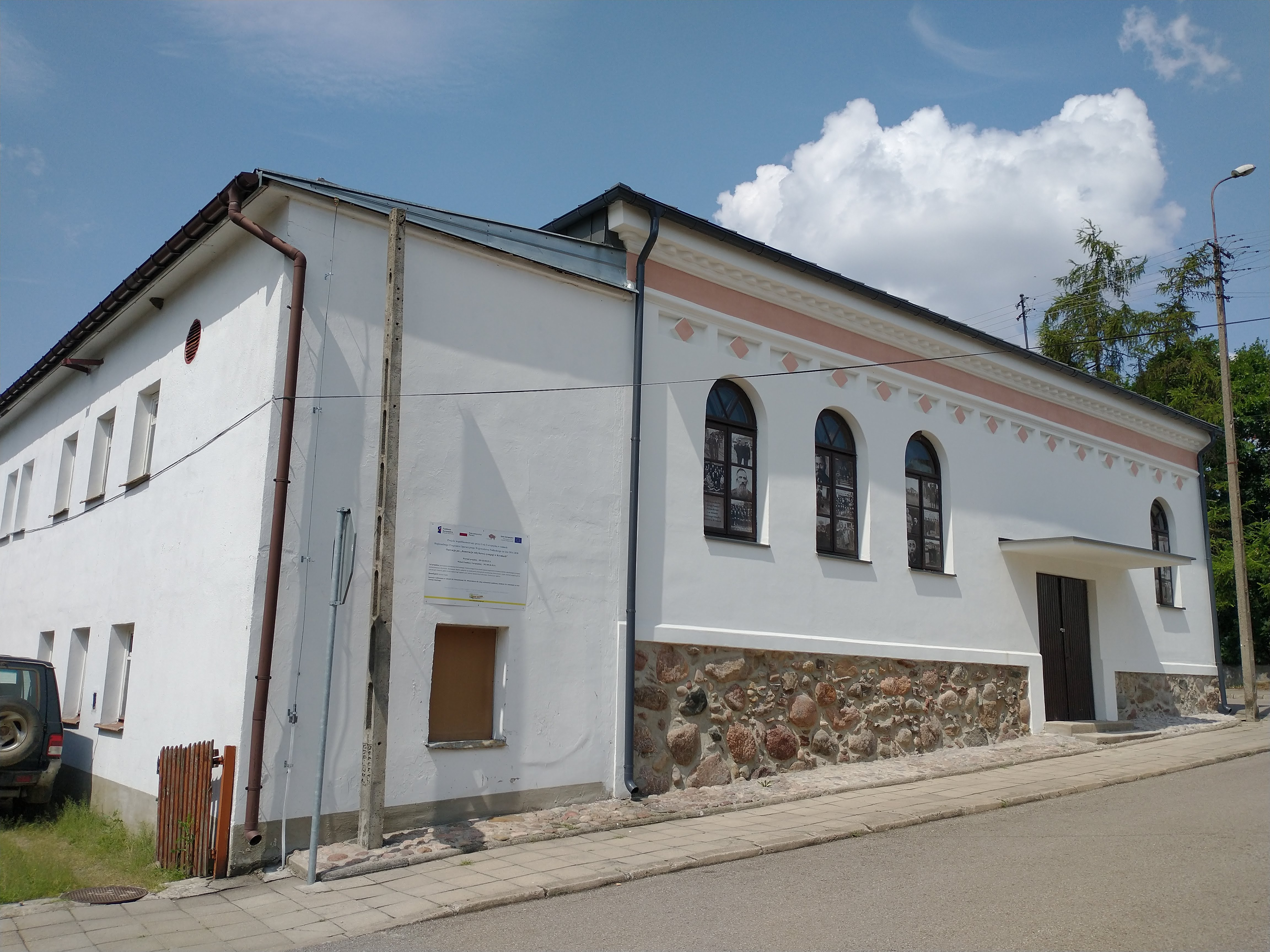
Former Caucasus Synagogue

Jews began living in Krynki in the 17th century when the Polish king Władysław IV Vasa invited them to town to boost trade and manufacturing. From that moment, the Jewish population continued to grow and their culture flourished.

A notable part of Krynki's history was the Jewish labour movement of 1905. In that year, Jakow Pat led Jewish workers and created the independent Republic of Krynki in defiance of the Russian imperial rule. After World War I Poland returned to independence and democracy. The Jews began emigrating to Palestine and the United States for greater economic benefit.

=== The Holocaust ===
Under German occupation during World War II, the German authorities began the reign of terror by executing 30 prominent Jews, and in December 1941 created a Jewish ghetto in Krynki. The Jews from neighbouring settlements were deported to Krynki including 1,200 inhabitants of Brzostowica Wielka. Around 6,000 people were imprisoned there with insufficient food and severe overcrowding. The liquidation of the ghetto began in November 1942. The ghetto inmates, men, women and children, were deported to the Nazi transit camp in Kiełbasin and sent off aboard Holocaust trains to the Treblinka extermination camp.

The Jewish population, however, did not remain passive. During the ghetto liquidation action, a number of Jewish insurgents responded by shooting at the Nazi police including their gun-wielding Belarusian auxiliaries, and many escaped into the forest. Today, no Jews live in Krynki, but the memory of them still lives on. Many of the former residents memoires were published in Tel Aviv, Israel in 1970.

== Points of interest ==
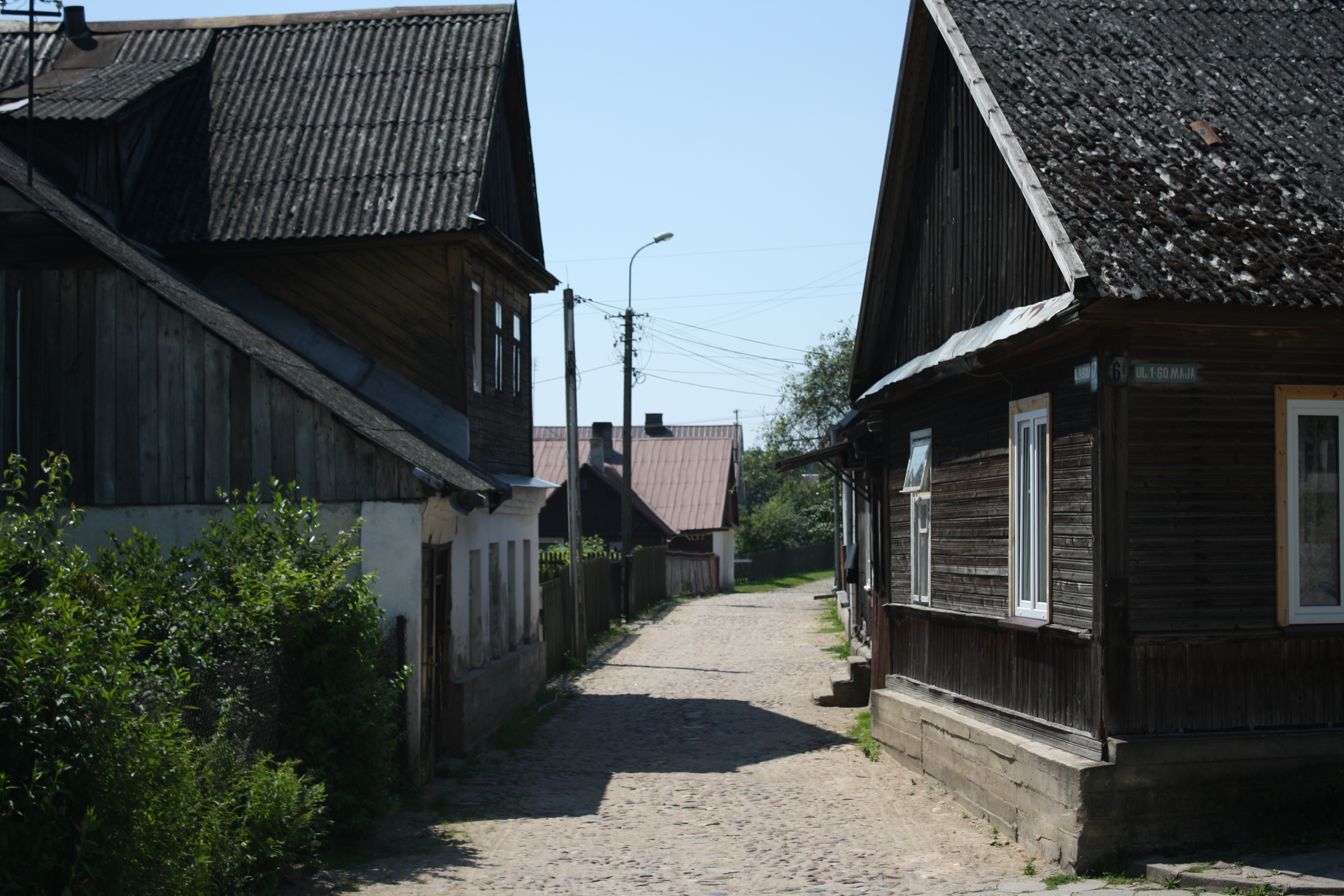
Traditional wooden buildings in Krynki

- Jewish cemetery; one of the largest, oldest Jewish cemeteries in eastern Poland.
- Two Orthodox churches and cemeteries.
- St. Anne's Catholic church, designed by Stefan Szyller who is famous for designing the Poniatowski Bridge in Warsaw.
- Krynki originally was home to three synagogues. Two are still standing, however they are not active. The crumbling ruins of the third and the largest Beth Ha Kneseth Synagogue destroyed by the Nazis were imploded in 1971 by the communist authorities for safety reasons.

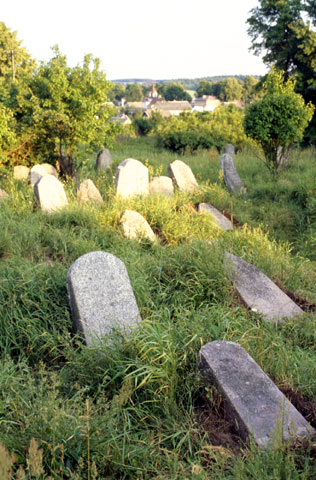
Gravestones at Jewish cemetery

=== Jewish Cemetery ===
The Jewish cemetery in Krynki was first established in 1662 and later expanded. It may be the largest shtetl Jewish cemetery in Poland. It was partially destroyed during WWII. More than 3000 gravestones remain, many of which are damaged. Based on the size and number of gravestones, it may be the largest shtetl cemetery in Poland. Some of the original rock wall remains. There is an ongoing restoration project lead by local residents and a descendant based in the U.S.
