= Polish cavalry brigade order of battle in 1939 =

The following is a standard order of battle of the Polish cavalry brigade in 1939.

== Chain of command ==
Polish Cavalry Brigade - chain of command
| | Sub-unit | C/O | squadron-sized | platoon-sized | smaller units |
|---|---|---|---|---|---|
| commanding officer | Staff and headquarters | deputy commanding officer chief military judge chaplain | | | |
| commanding officer | Staff and headquarters | chief of staff | operational officer intelligence officer | military police platoon | |
| commanding officer | Staff and headquarters | chief communications officer | communication squadron | | |
| commanding officer | Staff and headquarters | chief commander of the tabors | tabor's workshop 2 commands of march columns | 3 columns each | |
| commanding officer | Staff and headquarters | quartermaster | transport officer armament officer chief steward officer chief doctor chief veterinarian | artillery park unit steward park unit medical platoon veterinary platoon | |
| commanding officer | Headquarters commander | | staff squadron | | |
| commanding officer | Commander's units | | bicycle squadron (recce/liaison) engineering squadron | HMG platoon | |
| commanding officer | cavalry regiment 3 or 4 in each brigade | regiment commander | line squadrons - 4 in each regiment | cavalry platoon - 3 in each squadron | 3 sections (6 soldiers each); LMG section (5 soldiers) squadron commanders troop |
| commanding officer | cavalry regiment 3 or 4 in each brigade | regiment commander | line squadrons - 4 in each regiment | | LMG section administration unit |
| commanding officer | cavalry regiment 3 or 4 in each brigade | regiment commander | HMG squadron maintenance squadron | 3 HMG platoons | 4 HMG each |
| commanding officer | cavalry regiment 3 or 4 in each brigade | regiment commander | | AT platoon bicycle platoon communications platoon | engineering squad |
| commanding officer | Mounted Artillery Unit (DAK) | DAK commander | | munitions supply column | 75 mm artillery battery 3 or 4 guns each |
| commanding officer | Mounted Artillery Unit (DAK) | DAK commander | | communications platoon | |
| commanding officer | Organic Armoured Unit | commander | | tankette squadron armoured car squadron | |
| commanding officer | Organic Rifle Battalion | | Rifles battalion | | |

== Composition and armament ==
The following is a list of all equipment, armament, men and means of transport in use by a cavalry regiment and a cavalry brigade of the Polish Army, as of 1939. The figures for brigades are based on official Polish Army instructions prepared in late 1930s. The numbers in brackets give the figures for a four-regiment brigade, as opposed to the standard three-regiment one. The figures for the regiments are given after the actual mobilisation report of September 1, 1939, of the 25th Greater Polish Uhlans Regiment. Note that the numbers for other units may vary, mostly due to different mobilisation schedules and other problems.

sPolish Cavalry Brigade and Regiment - equipment
| | Regiment | Brigade |
General
| officers | 36 | 232 (373) |
| privates and NCOs | 838 | 5 911 (6 911) |
| horses Cavalry horses Pack horses Cart-horses; Total | 616; 43; 221; 920 | 5 194 (6 291) |
Vehicles
| cars | 1 | 65 (66) |
| motorcycles | 1 | |
| field kitchens | 6 | |
| tabor carts | 86 | |
| chaplains cart | 1 | 4 |
| taczanka wz.28 or wz.36 | 13 | |
| bicycles | 36 | |
Armament
| Vis pistols | 133 | |
| wz. 34 sabres | 616 | |
| lances | 108 | |
| rifles Mannlicher 1888, Kbk wz. 1929, Kb wz. 98a, Mosin wz. 91/98/25, Kbk wz. 91/98/23 or Steyr-Mannlicher M1895 | 740 | 5000 |
| 7,92 mm karabin ppanc. wz 35 AT rifle | 12 | 51 (64) |
| rkm Browning wz. 28 LMG | 18 | 89 (107) |
| Maxim 08/15 and lkm wz. 08/18 MGs | | 10 (12) |
| Ckm wz.30 HMG | 12 | 52 (64) |
Organic artillery
| grenade launchers wz. 1930 and wz. 1936 | | 9 (9) |
| 81mm mortar wz. 31 | | 2 |
| 75 mm Armata 75 mm wz.02/26 field gun | | 12 (16) |
| 40 mm armata plot. wz. 36 AA gun | | 2 (2) |
| 37 mm Armata ppanc. wz. 36 AT gun | 4 | 14 (18) |
Organic armoured unit
| wz. 34 or wz.29 armoured car | | 8 |
| reconnaissance tankette TKS or TK-3 | | 13 |

== Polish cavalry brigades in 1939 ==
=== Cavalry ===
- Kraków Cavalry Brigade (Kraków) - under Brigadier General Zygmunt Piasecki
- Kresowa Cavalry Brigade (Brody) - under Colonel Stefan Hanka-Kulesza
- Mazowiecka Cavalry Brigade (Warsaw) under Colonel Jan Karcz
- Nowogródzka Cavalry Brigade (Baranowicze) under Brigadier General Władysław Anders
- Podlaska Cavalry Brigade (Białystok) under Brigadier General Ludwik Kmicic-Skrzyński
- Podolska Cavalry Brigade (Stanisławów) under Colonel Leon Strzelecki
- Pomeranian Cavalry Brigade (Bydgoszcz) under Colonel Adam Zakrzewski
- Suwalska Cavalry Brigade (Suwałki) under Brigadier General Zygmunt Podhorski
- Wielkopolska Cavalry Brigade (Poznań) under Brigadier General Roman Abraham
- Wileńska Cavalry Brigade (Wilno) under Colonel Konstanty Drucki-Lubecki
- Wołyńska Cavalry Brigade (Równe) under Colonel Julian Filipowicz

=== Armoured-Motorised Brigades ===
Different armament and structure

- 10th Motorized Cavalry Brigade (Poland) (Rzeszów) - dowódca: płk dypl. Stanisław Maczek
- Warszawska Brygada Pancerno-Motorowa (Warsaw) - dowódca: płk dypl. Stefan Rowecki

== See also ==
- Polish cavalry
- Polish Armed Forces
- Polish Defensive War of 1939
