= Lech Kołakowski =

Polish politician (born 1963)

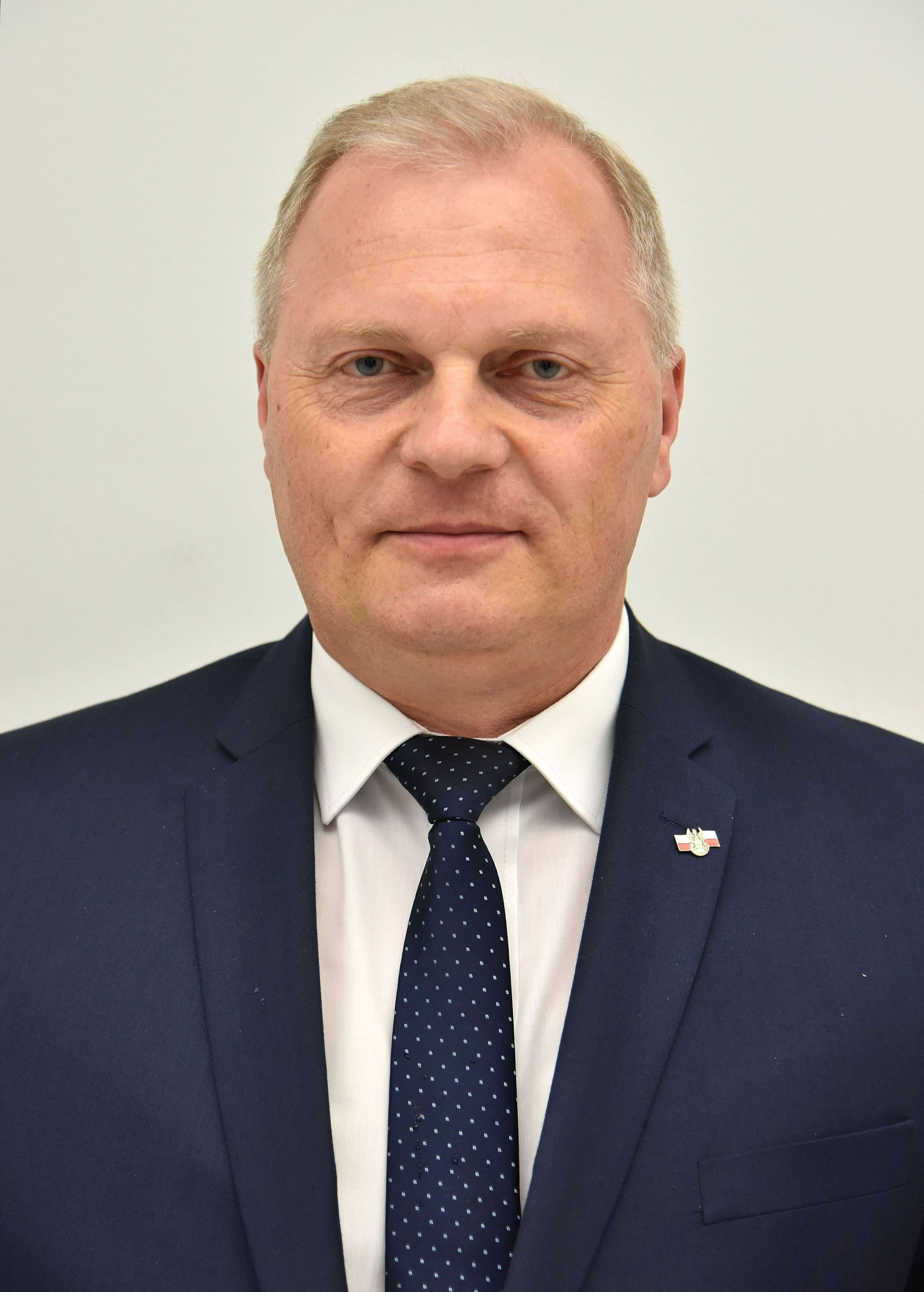

Member of the Sejm
- In office 25 September 2005 – 12 November 2023
- Constituency: 24 – Białystok

Personal details
- Born: 1963 (age 62–63)
- Party: Independent (from 2020); Law and Justice (until 2020)

Lech Antoni Kołakowski (born 13 June 1963 in Zambrów) is a Polish politician. He was elected to the Sejm on 25 September 2005, getting 6,373 votes in 24 Białystok district as a candidate from the Law and Justice list. He left the party in November 2020.

== See also ==
- Members of Polish Sejm 2005–2007
