= Zygmunt Podhorski =

Polish Army Brigadier General

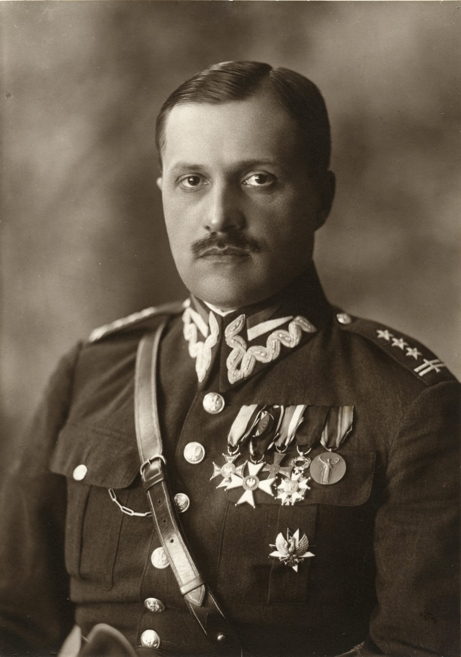
- Born: 25 May 1891; Popudnia, Lipovets uezd, Kiev Governorate, Russian Empire
- Died: 12 September 1960 (aged 69); London, United Kingdom
- Military career
- Allegiance: Russian Empire; Second Polish Republic
- Branch: Imperial Russian Army; Polish Armed Forces; Polish Armed Forces in the West
- Service years: 1914-1946
- Units: 1st Krechowce Uhlan Regiment, Suwałki Cavalry Brigade, Cavalry Division Zaza
- Awards: Virtuti Militari, Cross of Independence, Order of Polonia Restituta, Cross of Valour, Cross of Merit with Swords, Cross of Merit

Zygmunt Podhorski (nom de guerre Zaza; May 25, 1891 – September 12, 1960) was Brigadier General of the Polish Army. Born May 25, 1891, Podhorski fought in World War I (in the Russian Imperial Army), Polish–Soviet War and the Invasion of Poland. Altogether, he served in the military from 1914 until 1946. He died in 1960 in London.

== Biography ==
Podhorski was born in 1891 in the real estate of Popudnia, located in Kiev Governorate, Russian Empire (now: Ukraine), in a family of Polonized Russian knyazs, which had settled in Polish Kresy in the 16th century. In 1909, he graduated from a high school in Warsaw, and then spent his compulsory military service at 9th Uhlan Regiment at Bila Tserkva, where in 1911 he was promoted to the rank of chorazy. In 1911–1914 Podhorski studied at Agricultural Department of the Jagiellonian University. Since he was a junior officer of the Russian Army, Podhorski left Kraków to avoid arrest in August 1914, shortly before the outbreak of the war.

During World War I, Podhorski fought in Russian cavalry. In March 1915 he was promoted to podporucznik, and in October of that year was wounded during a skirmish with Austrian troops. He returned to active service in May 1916, and in February 1917 was transferred to 1st Uhlan Regiment, which consisted mostly of ethnic Poles. Podhorski distinguished himself in the Battle of Krechowce (July 24, 1917), for which he was awarded the Order of St. George, and promoted to poruchik (August 1917).

In September 1917, 1st Uhlan Regiment was merged into Polish I Corps in Russia under General Józef Dowbór-Muśnicki. In May 1918, after Polish Corps had been disarmed by German Ober Ost in Babruysk, Podhorski was transferred to Polish forces in Kuban, and later served as military attaché of Polish envoy in Kiev. On November 3, 1918, he returned to Poland, and became involved in creation of Polish cavalry forces. On November 11, 1918, ahead of a mounted squadron, he seized military barracks located on Koszykowa Street in Warsaw, disarming German soldiers stationed there. On December 6 he was promoted to rittmeister, and soon afterwards sent to southeastern Poland, to fight in the Polish-Ukrainian War.

In February 1920, Podhorski was commanded reserve squadron of 1st Uhlan Regiment stationed in Tarnów. In July he was promoted to major, and as commandant of 203rd Volunteer Uhlan Regiment, he fought against the invading Red Army near Ciechanów. On September 9, 1920, Podhorski was named commandant of 1st Krechowce Uhlan Regiment, stationed in Augustów, remaining in this post until July 29, 1927. In the 1920s, he supported Polish Army veterans settlements in Kresy (see osadnik). In 1927, Podhorski was sent to a military officers school in France: upon his return, he was named commandant of Cavalry Training Center in Grudziądz (1928–1935). In July 1935 he was transferred to 13th Cavalry Brigade in Płock, and in 1937 he was named commandant of Suwalska Cavalry Brigade. On March 19, 1938, Zygmunt Podhorski was promoted to General brygady.

During the 1939 Invasion of Poland, Podhorski commanded Suwalska Cavalry Brigade, which was part of Independent Operational Group Narew (on September 9 – 10, when his brigade was engaged in heavy fighting near Zambrów, Podhorski temporarily commanded the Narew Group).

On September 11, Podhorski created the so-called Operational Cavalry Group, which consisted of remnants of Suwalska Cavalry Brigade and Podlaska Cavalry Brigade. With his forces, he broke through German encirclement into the Białowieża Forest, where on September 20, Operational Cavalry Group was renamed into Zaza Cavalry Division, named so after Podhorski's nom de guerre. The division marched southwards, to join Independent Operational Group Polesie in final days of September 1939. Podhorski fought in the Battle of Kock (1939), after which he was captured by the Wehrmacht.

General Zygmunt Podhorski was kept at Oflag IV-B Koenigstein, Oflag IV-A Hohnstein and Oflag VIII-E Johannisbrunn. In April 1942, he was transferred to Oflag VII-A Murnau, where he was kept until its liberation on April 5, 1945. A few weeks later, on June 19, he joined the Polish Armed Forces in the West. After demobilization, Podhorski settled with his family in London. He was an active member of Polish community there, supporting General Władysław Anders. He died September 12, 1960, in London, and was buried at Brompton Cemetery.

== Awards ==
- Gold Cross of the Virtuti Militari,
- Silver Cross of the Virtuti Militari,
- Officers Cross of the Order of Polonia Restituta,
- Cross of Independence,
- Cross of Valour (Poland) (twice),
- 1914–1918 Inter-Allied Victory medal (France),
- Legion of Honour,
- Order of the White Eagle (Serbia),
- Order of St. George.

== Sources ==
- Polski Słownik Biograficzny, T.XXVII/I, Zeszyt 112, Ossolineum 1982
- Cezary Leżeński / Lesław Kukawski: O kawalerii polskiej XX wieku. Wrocław: Zakład Narodowy im. Ossolińskich, 1991. ISBN 83-04-03364-X.
- Zbigniew Mierzwiński: Generałowie II Rzeczypospolitej. Warszawa 1990: Wydawnictwo Polonia. ISBN 83-7021-096-1.

Tadeusz Jurga: Obrona Polski 1939. Warszawa: Instytut Wydawniczy PAX, 1990. ISBN 83-211-1096-7.

== See also ==
- Media related to Zygmunt Podhorski at Wikimedia Commons
- List of Polish generals
