= Polish 151st Fighter Escadrille =

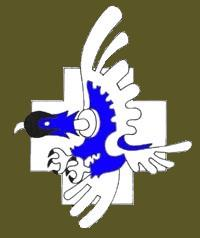
Emblem of the 151st Fighter Escadrille

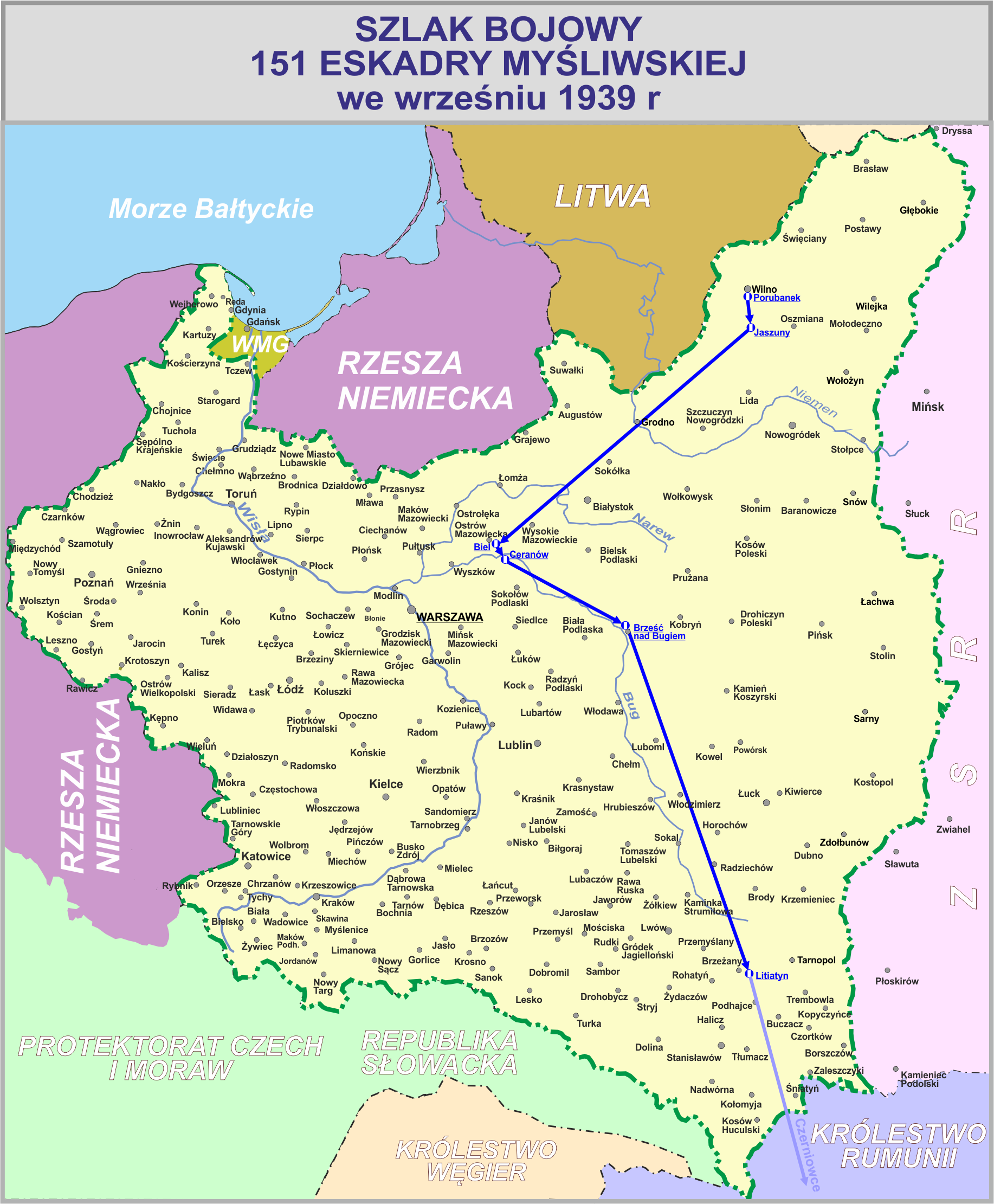

The 151st Fighter Escadrille of the Polish Air Force (Polish: 151. Eskadra Myśliwska) was one of the fighter units of the Polish Army in 1939.

== History ==
In September 1939 the 121st Fighter Escadrille was attached to the Operational Group Narew.

== Crew and equipment ==
On 1 September 1939 the escadrille had 10 PZL P.7a airplanes.

The air crew consisted of: commanding officer por. pil. Józef Brzeziński his deputy por. pil. Marian Wesołowski and 16 other pilots:

- ppor. pil. Jan Grzech
- ppor. pil. Wiktor Szulc
- pchor. pil. Michał Andruszko
- pchor. pil. Stanisław Andrzejewski
- pchor. pil. Józef Bodnar
- pchor. pil. Marian Łukaszewicz
- pchor. pil. Zygmunt Słomski
- pchor. rez. pil. Jerzy Pawlak
- pchor. rez. pil. Stefan Sawicki
- kpr. pil. Czesław Cichoń
- kpr. pil. Eugeniusz Hofman
- kpr. pil. Tadeusz Kawałkowski
- st. szer. pil. Michał Brzezowski
- st. szer. pil. Bronisław Kościk
- st. szer. pil. Ryszard Lewczyński
- st. szer. pil. Włodzimierz Marchewicz

== See also ==
- Polish Air Force order of battle in 1939
