= Polish 13th Observation Escadrille =

WWII air force unit

The 13th Observation Escadrille was a unit of the Polish Air Force at the beginning of the Second World War. The unit was attached to the SGO Narew.

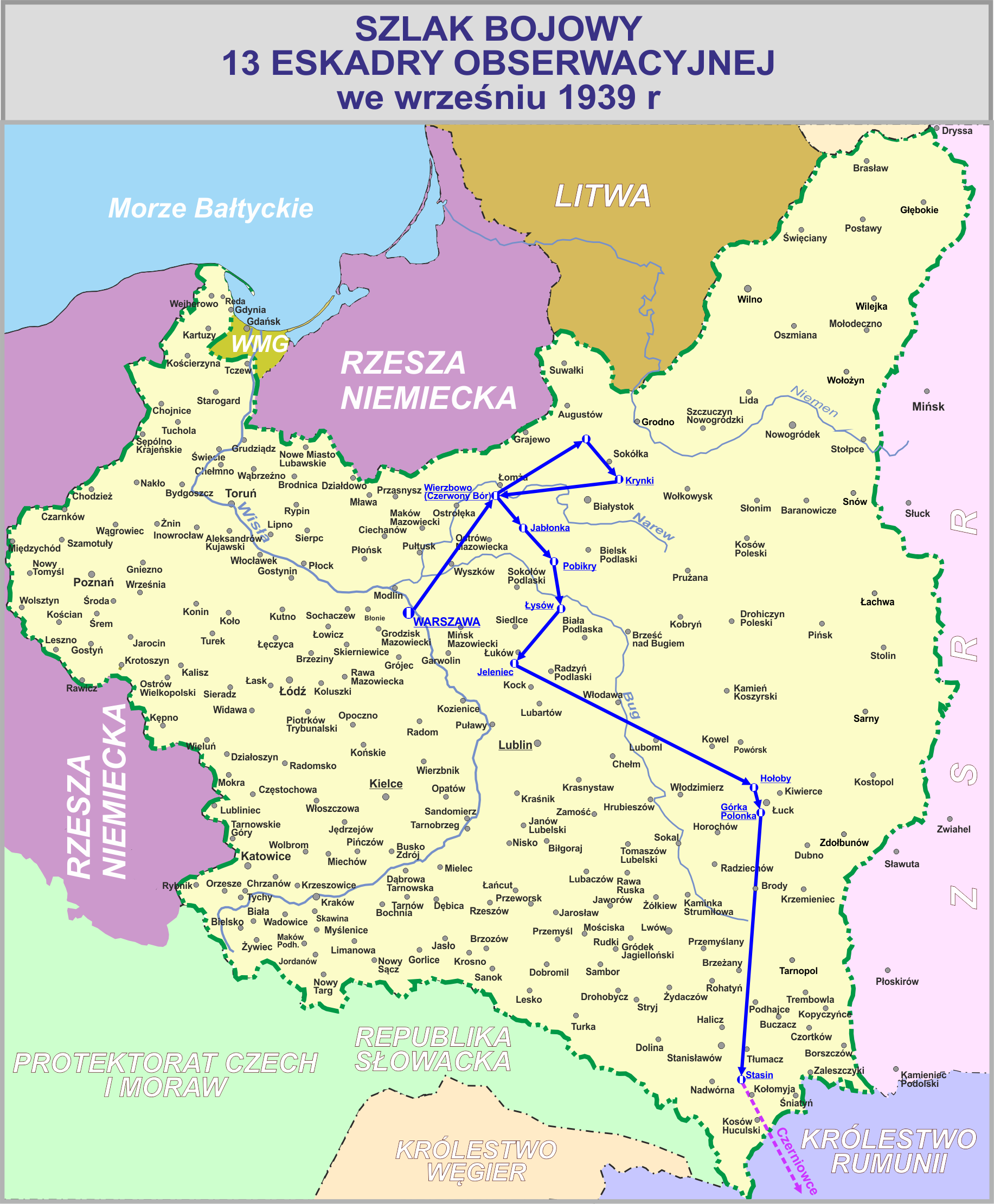

== Air crew ==
Commanding officer: kpt. obs. Lucjan Fijuth

== Equipment ==
7 RWD-14b Czapla and 2 RWD-8 airplanes.

== See also ==
- Polish Air Force order of battle in 1939
