= Czerwony Bór, Podlaskie Voivodeship =

Czerwony Bór
- Village
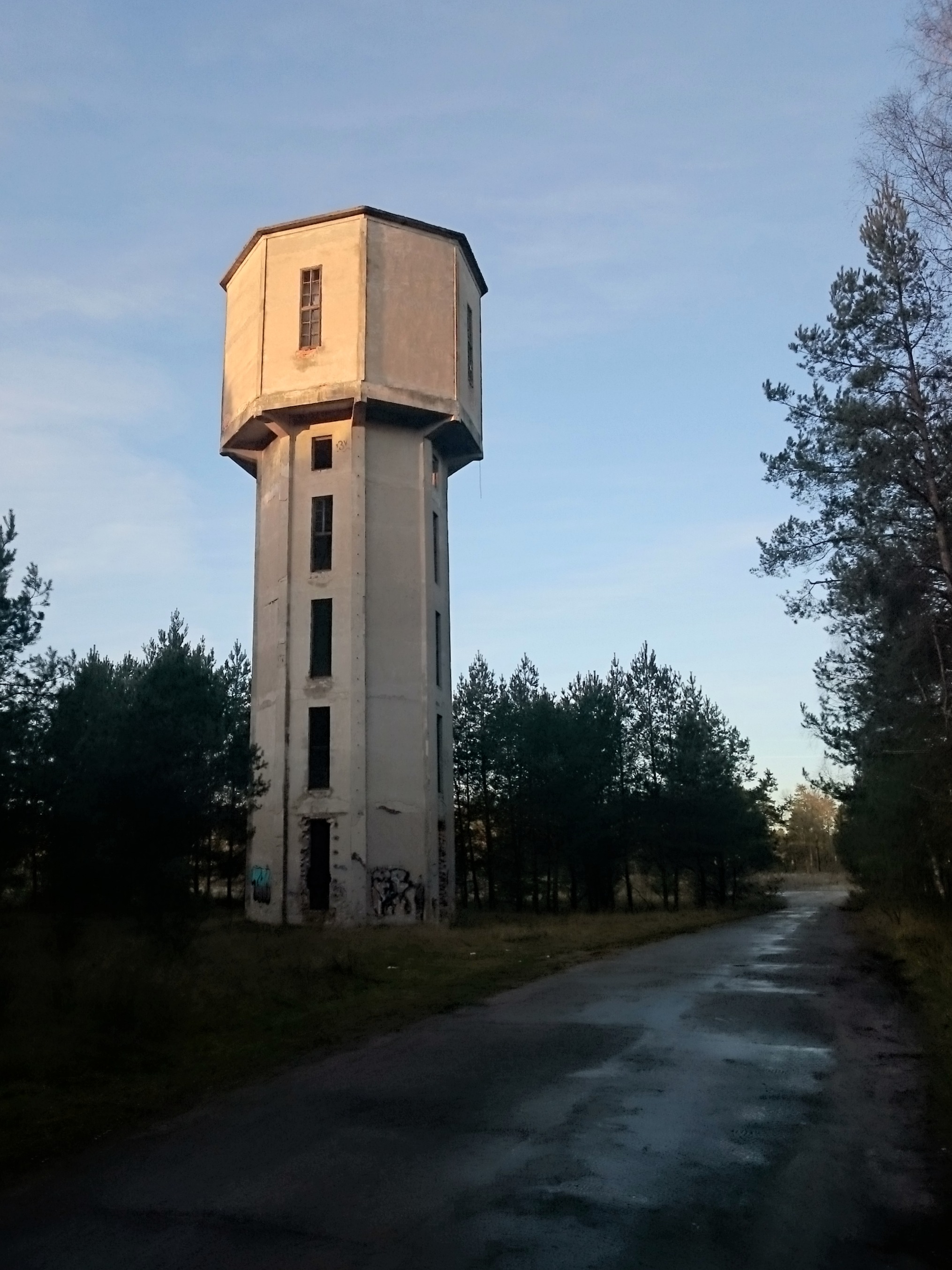
- Water tower

- Location within Poland
- Coordinates: 53°03′32″N 22°08′42″E
- Country: Poland
- Voivodeship: Podlaskie
- County: Zambrów
- Gmina: Zambrów
- Time zone: UTC+1 (CET)
  - Summer (DST): UTC+2 (CEST)
- Postal code: 18-400
- Vehicle registration: BZA

Czerwony Bór (Polish pronunciation: [t͡ʂɛrˈvɔnɨ ˈbur]) is a village in the administrative district of Gmina Zambrów, within Zambrów County, Podlaskie Voivodeship, in north-eastern Poland. It is approximately 13 km (8 mi) north of Zambrów and 62 km (39 mi) west of the regional capital Białystok.

Following the German-Soviet invasion of Poland, which started World War II in September 1939, the village was occupied by the Soviet Union until 1941, and then by Germany until 1944. Under German occupation, Italian POWs worked as forced labourers on the construction of a railway between Czerwony Bór and Zambrów.
