= 18th Infantry Division (Poland) =

- 18 Dywizja Piechoty
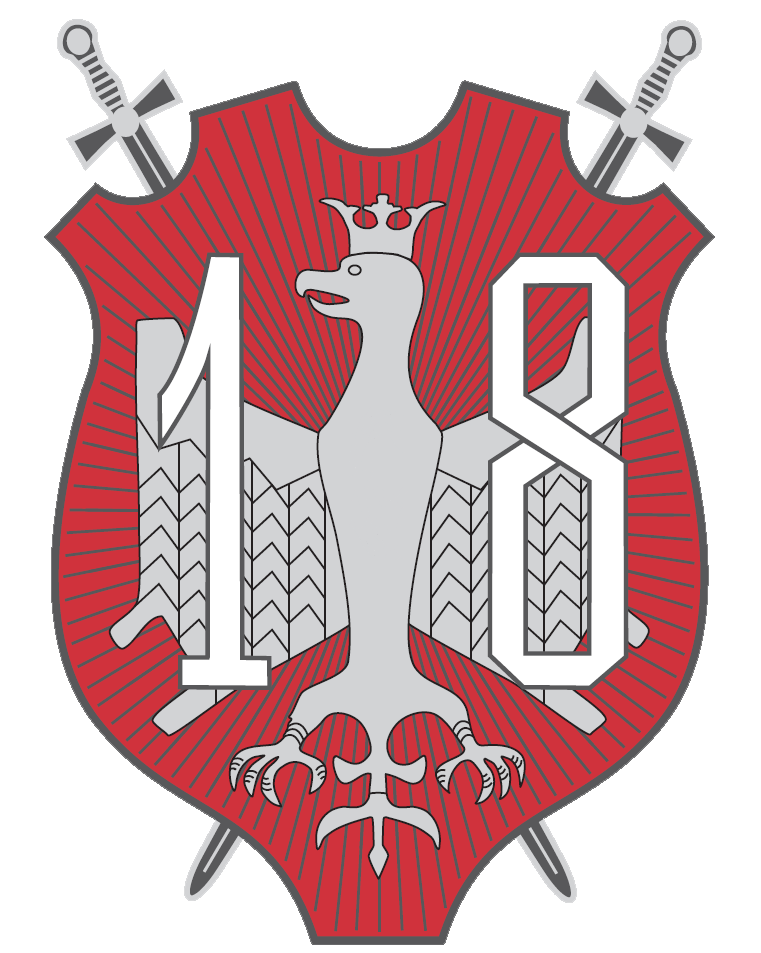
- 18th Mechanized Division Command official unit insignia
- Active: 1920-1939; 2018-Present
- Country: Poland
- Branch: Polish Land Forces
- Type: Infantry
- Size: Division
- Part of: Armed Forces General Command
- Engagements: World War II

Insignia
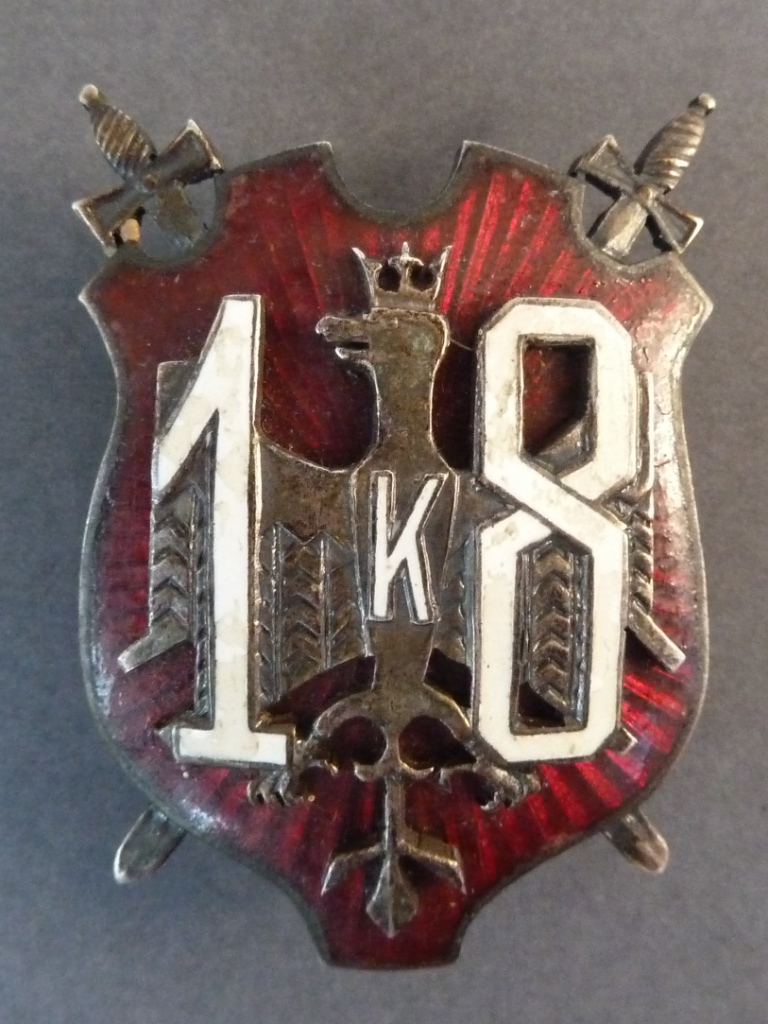
- Historical 18th Infantry Division official unit badge (1920-1939)

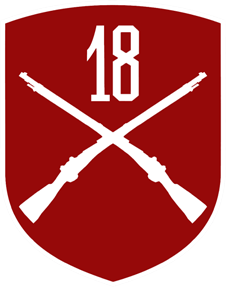
- Current 18th Mechanized Div. shoulder sleeve insignia (everyday uniform)

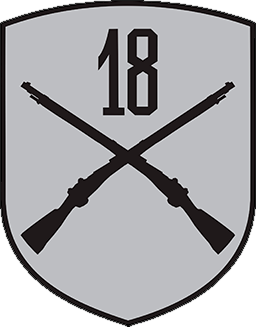
- Current 18th Mechanized Div. shoulder sleeve insignia (field uniform)

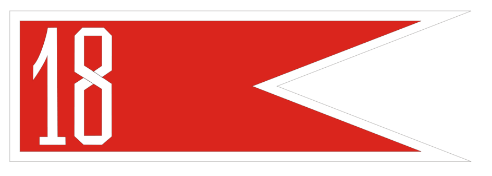
- Current 18th Mechanized Div. beret flash

The 18th Infantry Division (Polish: 18. Dywizja Piechoty) is a division of the Polish Armed Forces. The division was originally part of Polish Army during the interbellum period, which took part in the Polish September Campaign. Stationed in Łomża and commanded in 1939 by Colonel Stefan Kossecki, it was part of the Narew Independent Operational Group.

The division was re-established in its modern form in September 2018 and renamed to the 18th Mechanized Division (18. Dywizja Zmechanizowana) as part of an expansion of the Polish Army, partially as a result of heightened security threats to Poland. The division will have achieved initial operating capacity by the end of 2019, with further strengthening of the formation to be completed by the mid-2020s.

== History ==
It was formed in 1919 from the units of the Blue Army.

=== Interwar ===
Between 1919 and 1939, Łomża and neighboring towns were located very close to the border of Poland and German province of East Prussia. Defense of this area was regarded as crucial in any future conflict, so 18th Division was regarded as an elite unit. More than 50% of its soldiers were local conscripts from northern Mazovia and Podlasie, whose patriotism was highly appreciated.

=== Invasion of Poland ===
The Division assembled on August 30, 1939, and the next day it occupied defense positions along the Narew river. Until September 3, it had a limited contact with the Wehrmacht. It was then ordered to take positions previously held by the Polish 41st Infantry Division. On September 7, it left Ostrołęka and was ordered to halt the advance of German 21st Infantry Division near Nowogrod. The efforts of Polish soldiers were mixed, but on the night of Sept 9-10, it attacked a German armored column, destroying several vehicles and tanks.

During the next days the Division was engaged in heavy fights with units of General Heinz Guderian's XIX Army Corps. After several bloody skirmishes, the Germans severely wounded Colonel Kossecki. Twenty volunteers, who wanted to take his body from the battleground, were killed by a German machine gun. Kossecki himself survived, but was captured by the Soviets and probably killed by them in the Katyn massacre. The division effectively ceased to exist.

In the night of September 13–14 the Germans massacred 200 Polish POWs, gathered in the courtyard in the barracks in Zambrów (the Zambrów massacre).

== 21st century ==
The reactivation of the Division was announced by the Polish Ministry of Defence in September 2018 as part of the effort to expand and modernize the Polish Army amidst heightened tension with Russia.

=== Organization 2024 ===
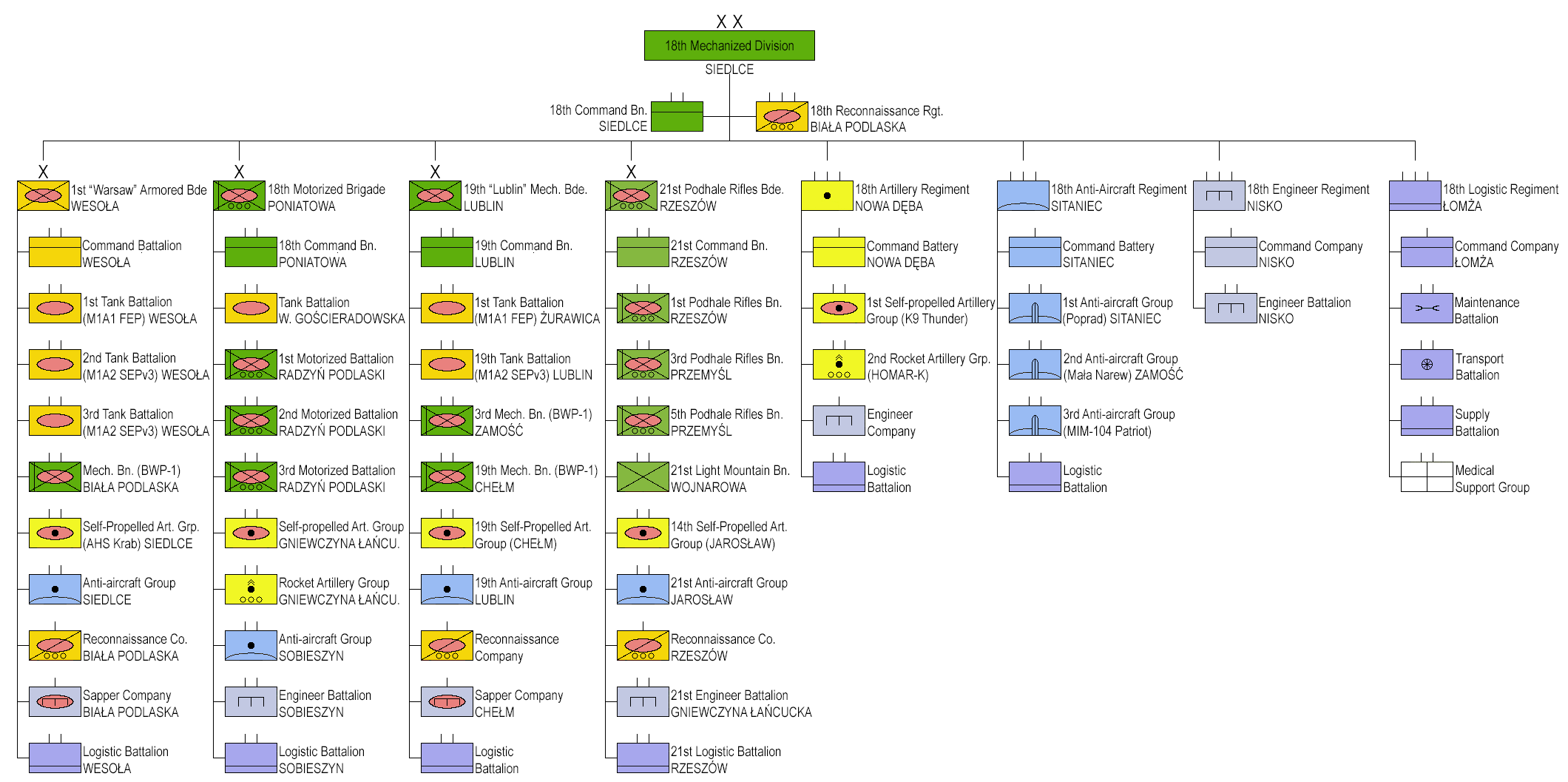
18th Mechanized Division organisation 2023 (click image to enlarge)

18th Mechanized Division units 2020

The 18th Mechanized Division (nicknamed The Iron Division) is headquartered in Siedlce and is organised as follows:

- 18th Mechanized Division, in Siedlce
  - 18th Command Battalion, in Siedlce
  - 1st "Warsaw" Armored Brigade "Tadeusz Kościuszko", in Wesoła
  - 18th Motorized Brigade, in Poniatowa (activated on 3 October 2023)
  - 19th "Lublin" Mechanized Brigade "Franciszek Kleeberg", in Lublin
  - 21st "Podhale Rifles" Brigade "Brig. Gen. Mieczysław Boruta-Spiechowicz", in Rzeszów
  - 18th Artillery Brigade "Col. Witold Sztark" in Nowa Dęba (being formed)
  - 18th Anti-Aircraft Regiment, in Sitaniec
  - 18th Sapper Regiment, in Nisko (former 16th Sapper Battalion, reorganization underway)
  - 18th Logistic Regiment, in Łomża

== See also ==
- Polish army order of battle in 1939
- Polish contribution to World War II
- List of Polish divisions in World War II
