= Independent Operational Group Narew =

Polish Army formation in 1939

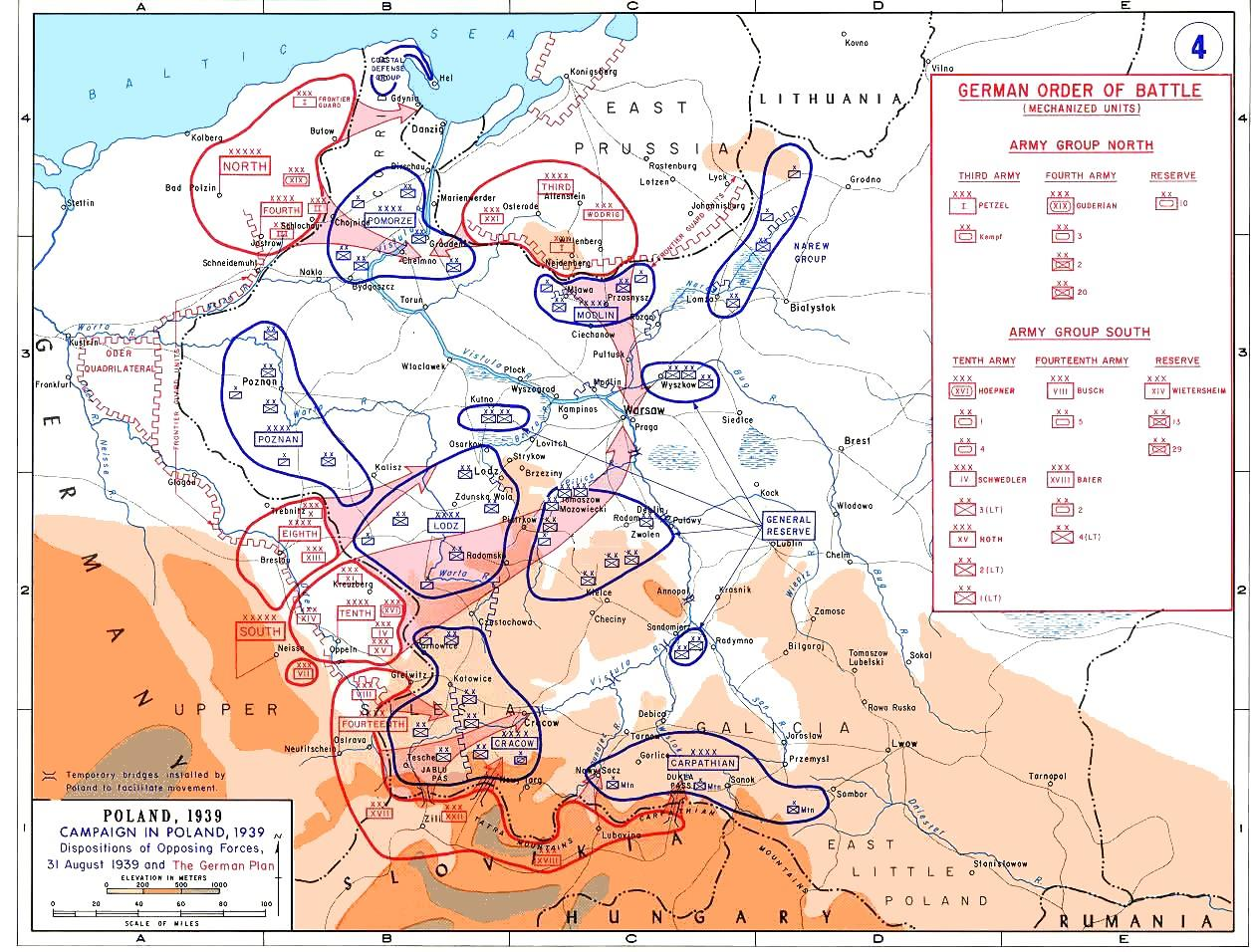
Forces as of 31 August and German plan of attack.

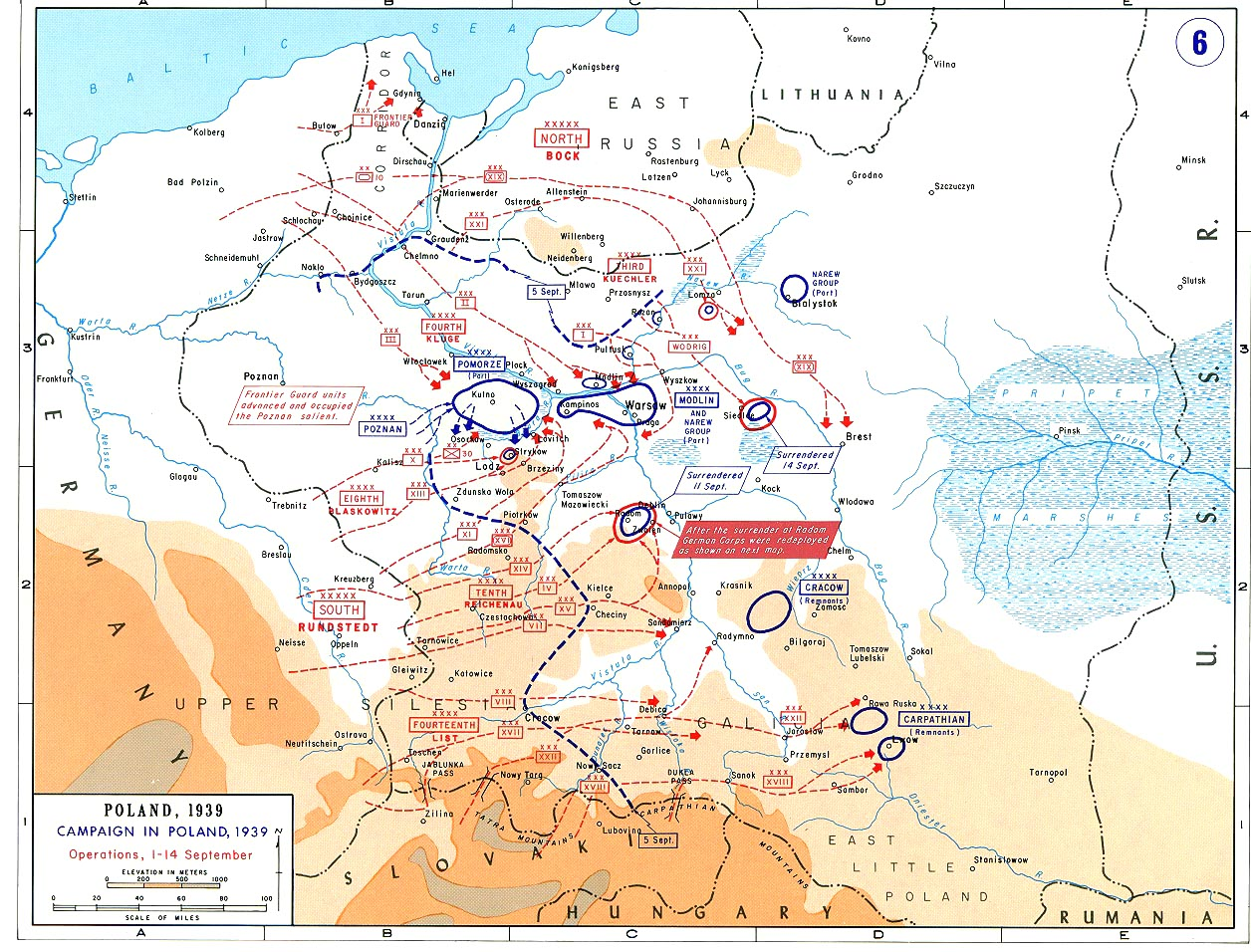
Forces as of 14 September with troop movements up to this date.

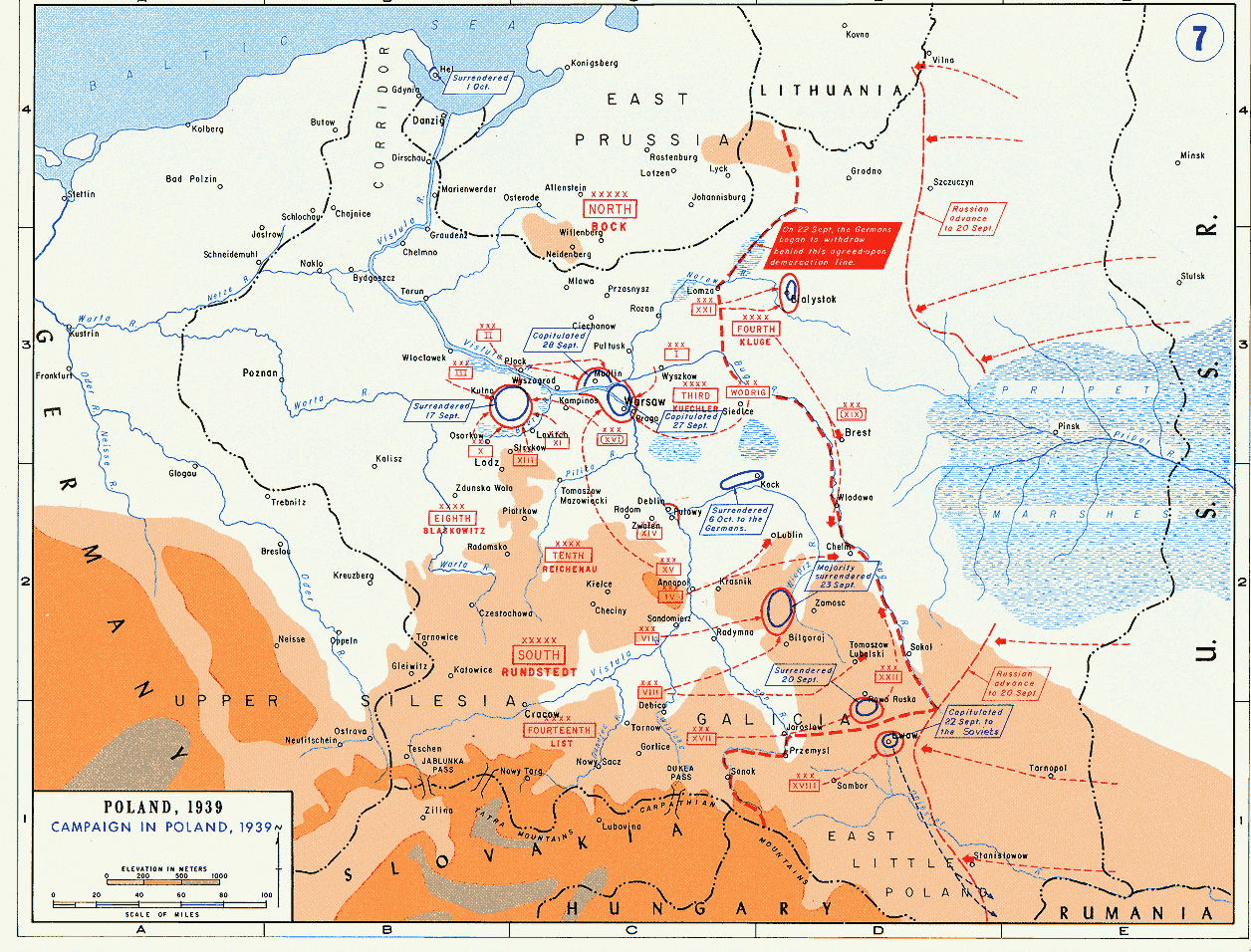
Forces after 14 September with troop movements after this date

Independent Operational Group Narew (Samodzielna Grupa Operacyjna Narew, SGO Narew) was one of the Polish Army Corps (Operational Groups) that defended Poland during the Invasion of Poland in 1939. It was created on 23 March 1939 and was commanded by general Czesław Młot-Fijałkowski.

== Tasks ==
SGO Narew was to defend the north-eastern frontline near the Lithuanian border, and prevent the German forces from crossing Narew and Biebrza rivers. It was to secure the left flank of Modlin Army.

== Operational history ==
The SGO Narew was defeated in the battle of Zambrów on 6 September, with the 18th Infantry Division being mostly destroyed. The remaining units retreated to Puszcza Białowieska large forest complex, and were later incorporated into Independent Operational Group Polesie.

== Organization ==
The commander of the unit was general Czesław Młot-Fijałkowski. His chief of staff was colonel Stanisław Podkowiński.

It consisted of 2 infantry divisions and 2 cavalry brigades:

- 18th Infantry Division (Polish: 18 Dywizja Piechoty).
- 33rd Infantry Division (Polish: 33 Dywizja Piechoty - reserve.).
- Podlaska Cavalry Brigade (Polish: Podlaska Brygada Kawalerii).
- Suwalska Cavalry Brigade (Polish: Suwalska Brygada Kawalerii).

Air Units attached to SGO Narew:

- Polish 151st Fighter Escadrille (Polish: 151 Eskadra Myśliwska)
- Reconnaissance Squadron 51 (Polish: 51 Eskadra Rozpoznawcza)
- Polish 13th Observation Escadrille (Polish: 13 Eskadra Obserwacyjna)
- Liaison Platoon No. 9 (Polish: Pluton łącznikowy nr 9)
