= Zambrów =

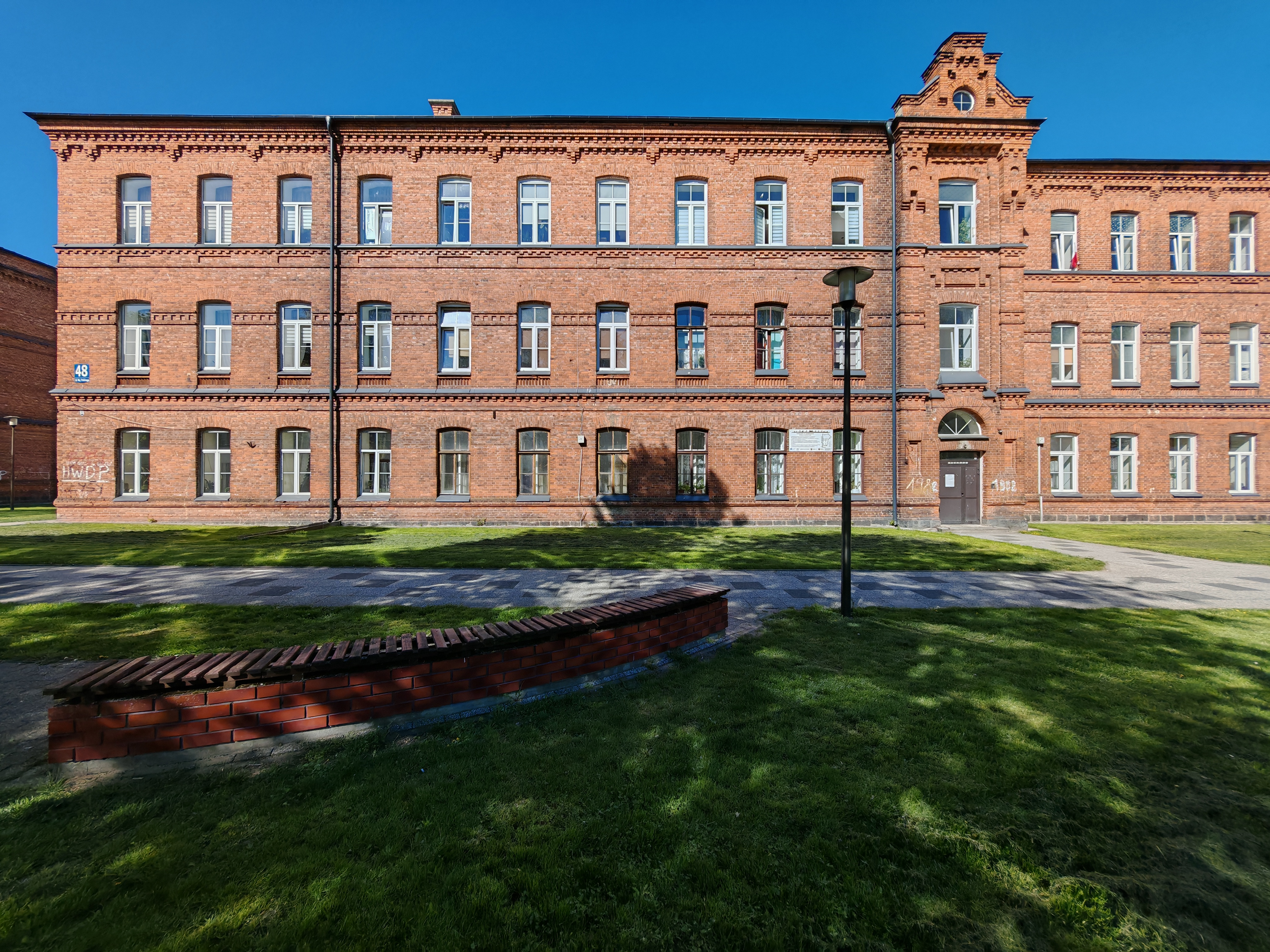

- Flag Coat of arms

- Location within Poland
- Coordinates: 52°59′N 22°15′E
- Country: Poland
- Voivodeship: Podlaskie
- County: Zambrów
- Gmina: Zambrów (urban gmina)
- First mentioned: 1283
- Town rights: 1430

Government
  - Mayor: Kazimierz Jan Dąbrowski

Area
  - Total: 19.02 km^{2} (7.34 sq mi)
- Highest elevation: 133 m (436 ft)
- Lowest elevation: 115 m (377 ft)

Population (2013)
  - Total: 21,166
  - Density: 1,113/km^{2} (2,882/sq mi)
- Time zone: UTC+1 (CET)
  - Summer (DST): UTC+2 (CEST)
- Postal code: 18-300 to 18-301
- Area code: +48 086
- Car plates: BZA
- Website: http://www.zambrow.pl

Zambrów [ˈzambruf] is a town in northeastern Poland with 21,166 inhabitants (2020). It is the capital of Zambrów County in the Podlaskie Voivodeship. It is situated on the Jabłonka River.

Founded in the Middle Ages, Zambrów is a former royal town of Poland, which prospered as a center of trade and brewing. Before World War II, it was the location of a Polish military school, and until the mid-20th century, it was a garrison town of the Polish Army. It was a place of Nazi German-perpetrated atrocities against prisoners-of-war and civilians during the German occupation of Poland in World War II with over 1,500 victims. It is located on the Route of the Heroes of the Battle of Warsaw 1920, the main highway connecting Białystok with Warsaw, Łódź and Wrocław.

== History ==
The name of the town comes from the term ząbr, which means a place where żubry (European bison) gather. The first mention of the town comes from 1283, during which the town was the property of the Masovian Dukes of the Piast dynasty within fragmented Poland, and it got its town rights (Chełmno law) in 1430. In 1479, Duke Janusz II of Płock established two annual fairs. Three additional fairs were established in 1523. Zambrów thrived thanks to fairs and also became a centre for brewing. The greatest development of the town came during the 15th and 16th centuries. It was a county seat and royal town, administratively located in the Masovian Voivodeship in the Greater Poland Province of the Kingdom of Poland. The mid-17th-century Swedish Deluge brought an end to the prosperity of the town as much of it was destroyed.

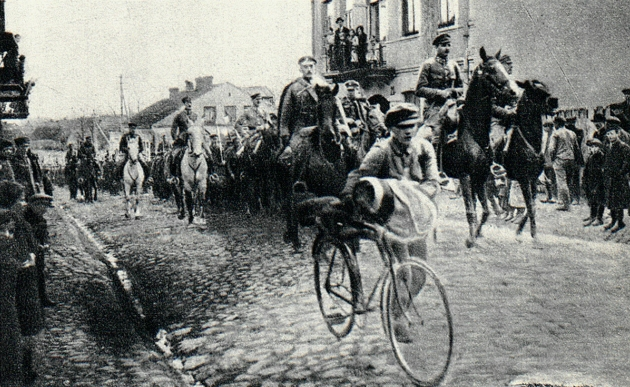
Polish 1st Legions Infantry Regiment entering Zambrów in 1916

It was annexed by Prussia in the Third Partition of Poland in 1795. In 1807 it was regained by Poles and included within the short-lived Duchy of Warsaw, and after its dissolution in 1815, it fell to the Russian Partition of Poland. During both the January and November Uprising against Russia, the area was witness to battles against Russian forces. Zambrów was also the site of Polish demonstrations and clashes with Russian soldiers after the massacres of Polish protesters committed by the Russians in Warsaw in 1861. As a result of persecutions by the Tsarist regime, the town was deprived of its town rights in 1870, and two Russian regiments of infantry were stationed in the town. Throughout World War I the area again faced much destruction. The Polish 1st Legion's Infantry Regiment under the command of Edward Rydz-Śmigły was stationed in the town during 1917. After Poland regained its independence, town rights were restored in 1919. During the inter-war years the town was linked to the military: the 71st Infantry Regiment was stationed there and the town was home to a military school.

=== World War II ===
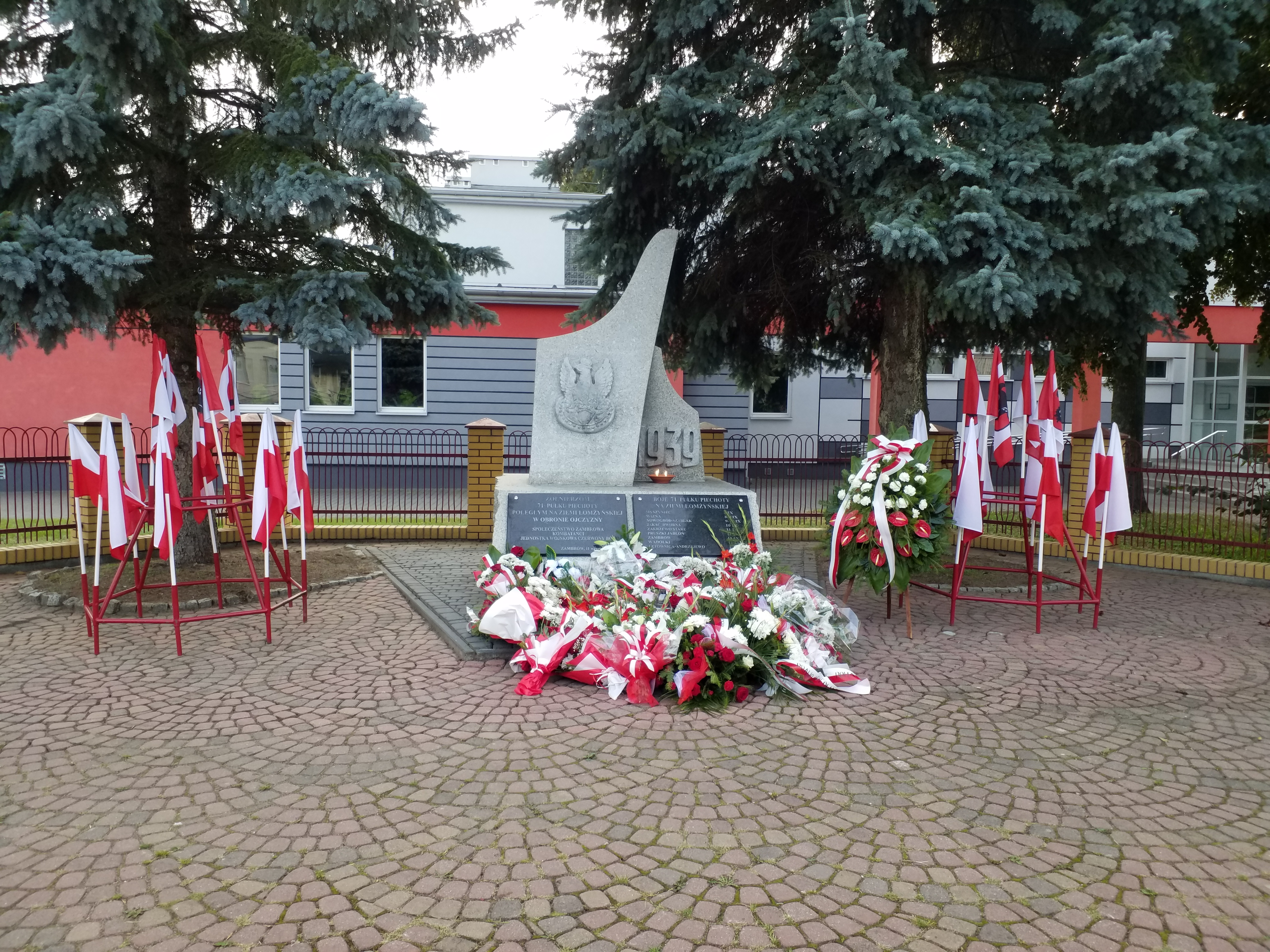
Monument to Polish soldiers killed in the 1939 defensive war

In 1939 the population of the town was over 7,000 people, over half of them Jews - many of whom had populated the town in the late 19th century from neighboring Jewish communities in the Łomża gubernya, such as Jablonka Koscielna. Between the 10 and 13 September the area was the fighting ground of the Polish 18th Infantry Division commanded by Colonel Stefan Kossecki and German XIX Panzer Corps under the command of General Guderian.

Polish soldiers from the 33rd, 71st, and 42nd Infantry regiments were taken prisoner. They were then taken from the square to the town barracks which were used for exercises. On September 13, 1939 the number of Polish PoWs was about 4,000. In the corners of the square machine guns were put on cars, and behind them horses were kept that belonged to the Polish unit. During the night, light reflectors were beamed upon the square. On the nights of the 13th and 14 September when Polish prisoners started to lie down to sleep, the German captors informed them that anybody that on that night who tried to rise or move from his place would be shot on the spot. After that information horses stormed the square, trampling the sleeping soldiers on the ground. In panic many Poles tried to escape, but the Germans immediately opened fire with machine guns into the crowd: this lasted over 10 minutes and ended only when some German soldiers were wounded by mistake. When the shooting stopped, the Germans again informed the Polish POWs that no movement was allowed. Throughout the night, the wounded and dying were crying for help, but no medical assistance was given. In the morning there were 200 dead and 100 wounded. This event came to be known as the Zambrów massacre. According to the witness reports the horses were either driven by the Germans or blinded by the reflector lights.

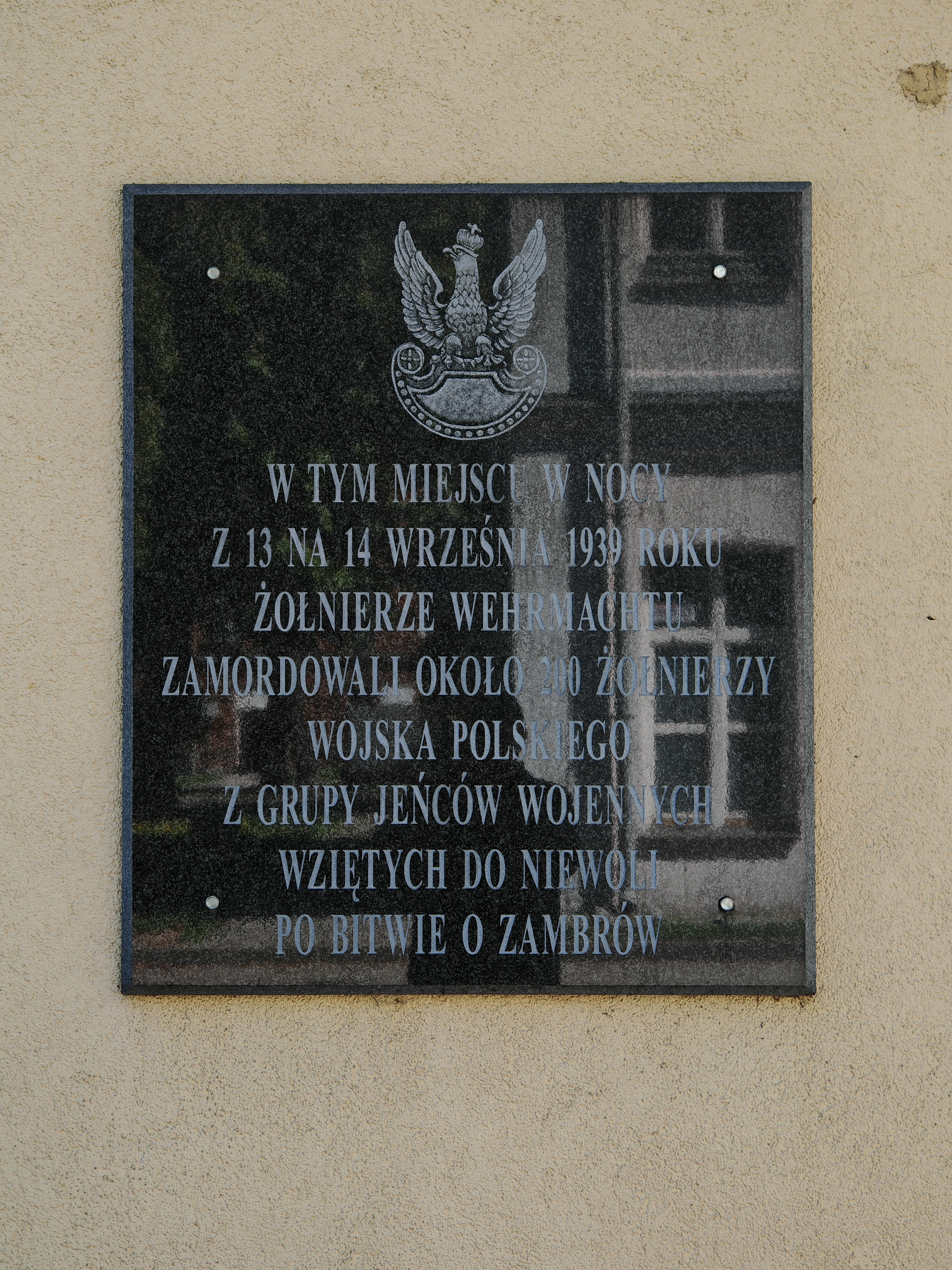
Memorial plaque at the place of the Zambrów massacre

Afterwards, the town was handed over by Germany to the Soviet Union in accordance with the Molotov–Ribbentrop Pact. It was under Soviet occupation until 1941. The commander, deputy commander, nine instructors and six other staff members of the Mazovian Reserve Artillery Officer Cadet School in Zambrów were murdered by the Russians in the Katyn massacre in 1940. The Soviets destroyed a pre-war monument to the fallen Polish insurgents of the January Uprising.

The town passed under German occupation following the Operation Barbarossa. During the occupation a ghetto was established for the Zambrów Jews by German authorities. At that time the Germans killed 2,000 Jews in the town, including community dignitaries, at the Glmbokih forest nearby. Jews were transferred to the town's ghetto from Moisokh Mazowiecki. At the beginning of September 1941 hundreds of Jews found "unfit for work", including the elderly and pregnant women, were killed at the nearby Rothke-Koski woods. In the second half of 1942 the town's ghetto accepted Jews from Czyżew, and they were employed as forced labour. In early November 1942 all the residents of the ghetto were transferred to an abandoned military camp, where some 14,000 to 17,000 Jews from the environment were concentrated in very harsh living conditions. In the winter of 1942/43 the remaining Jews were sent to Treblinka and Auschwitz to be murdered.

In 1941, the Germans also established a forced labour camp for local Poles in Zambrów. The camp housed around 60 people at a time, and a total of around 2,000 people passed through it, before it was dissolved in August 1944. The Germans also operated the Stalag 310 POW camp for Italian POWs and a subcamp of the Stalag 316 POW camp for Soviet POWs in Zambrów. The Italians worked as forced labourers on the construction of a railway between Zambrów and Czerwony Bór.

When the war ended the population of the town was 4,130 out of 7,620. According to rough estimates, war destruction reached 43%. In 1944, the town was restored to Poland, although with a Soviet-installed communist regime, which stayed in power until the Fall of Communism in the 1980s. In 1993, the pre-war monument to the fallen Polish insurgents of the January Uprising of 1863–1864 was rebuilt.

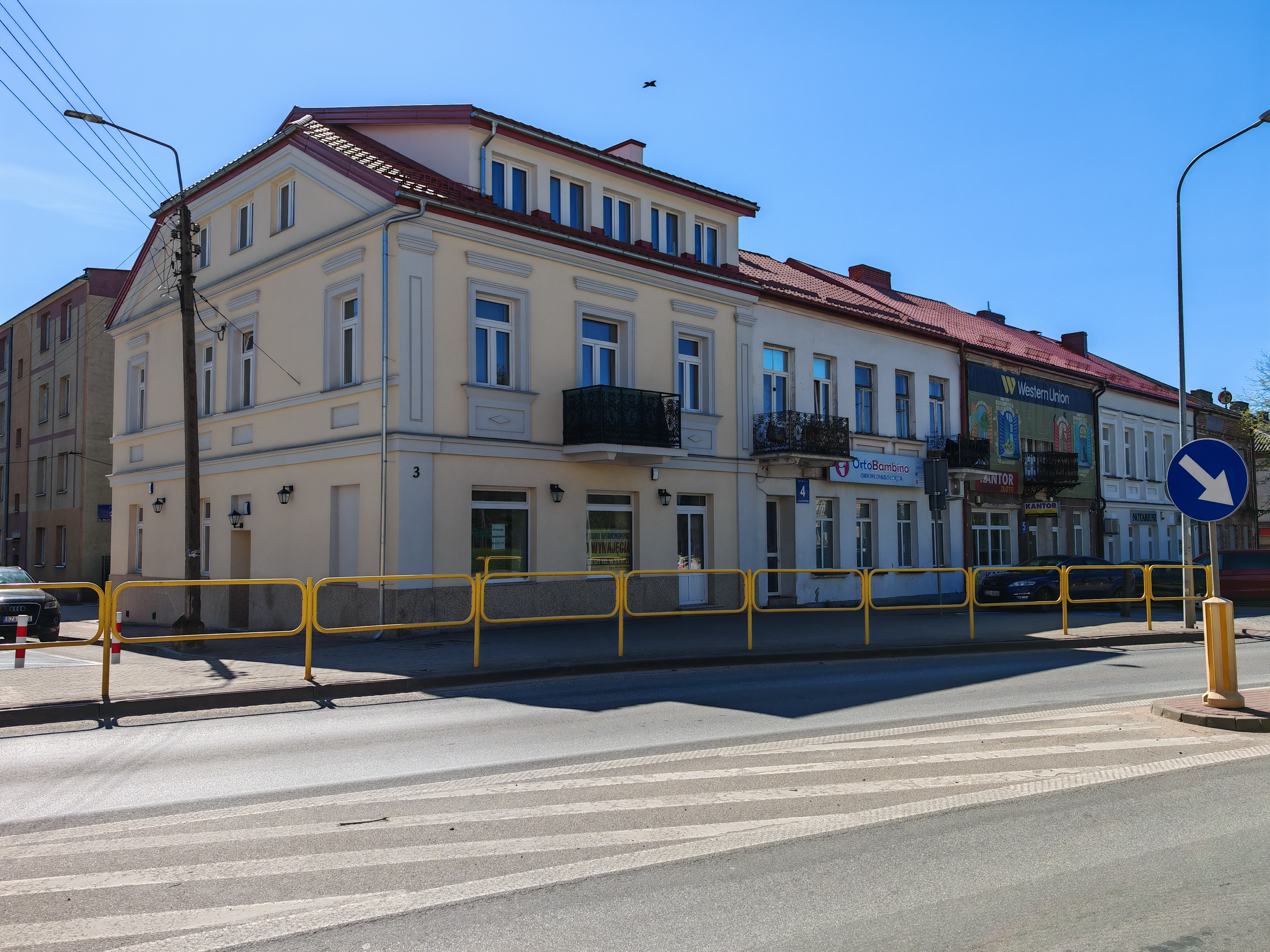
Old townhouses at Sikorski Square

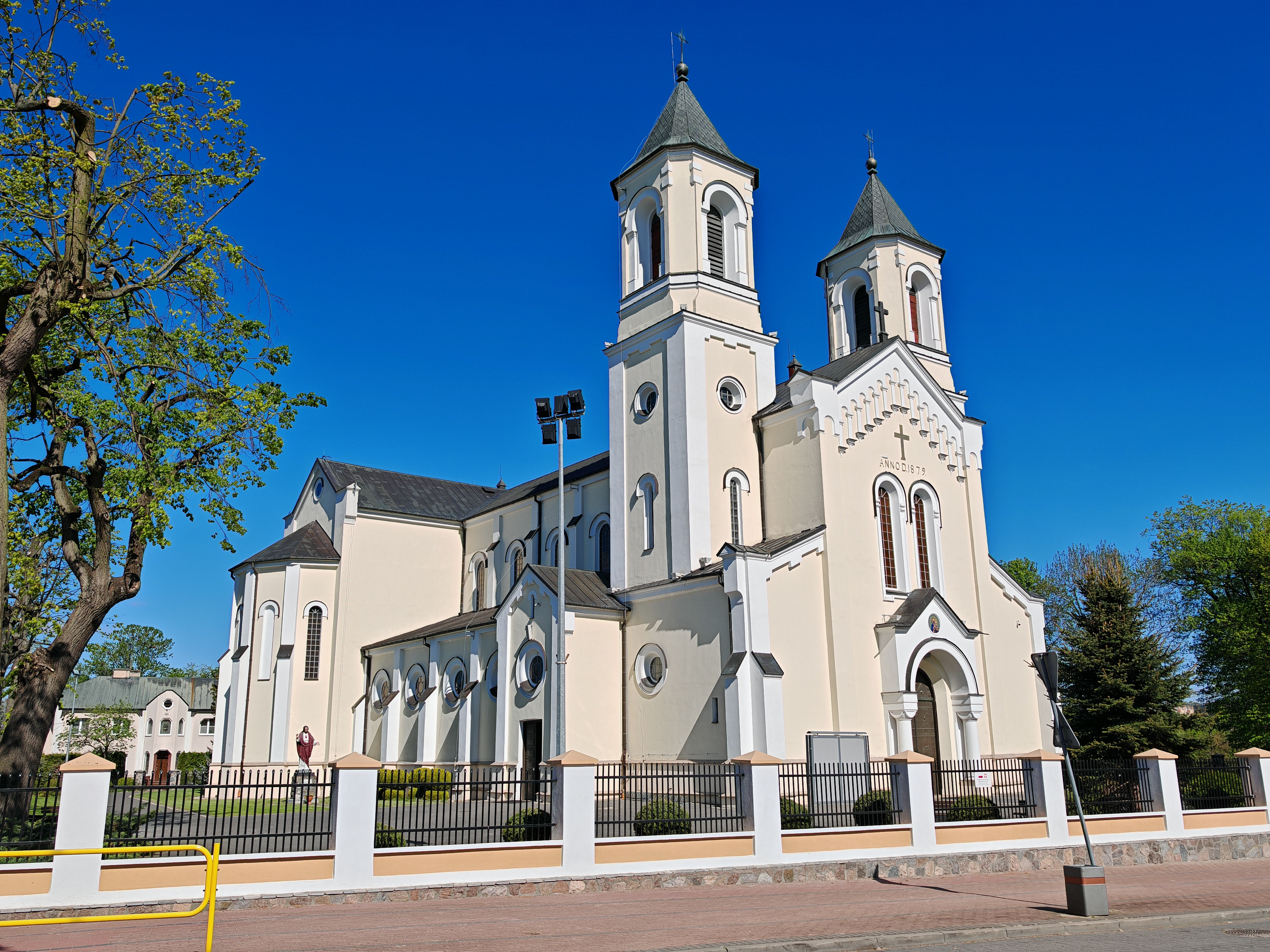
Holy Trinity church

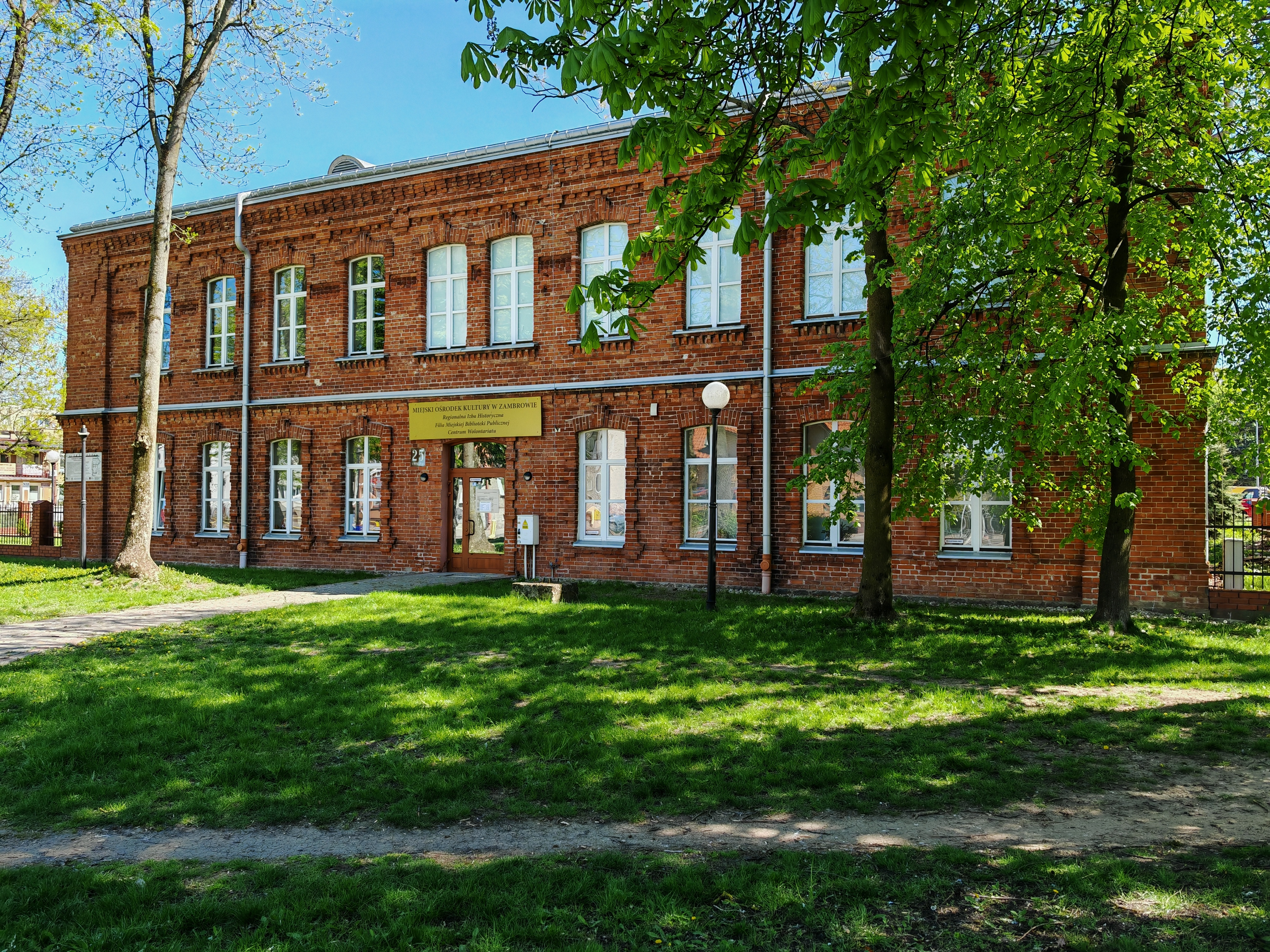
Regional Historical Chamber

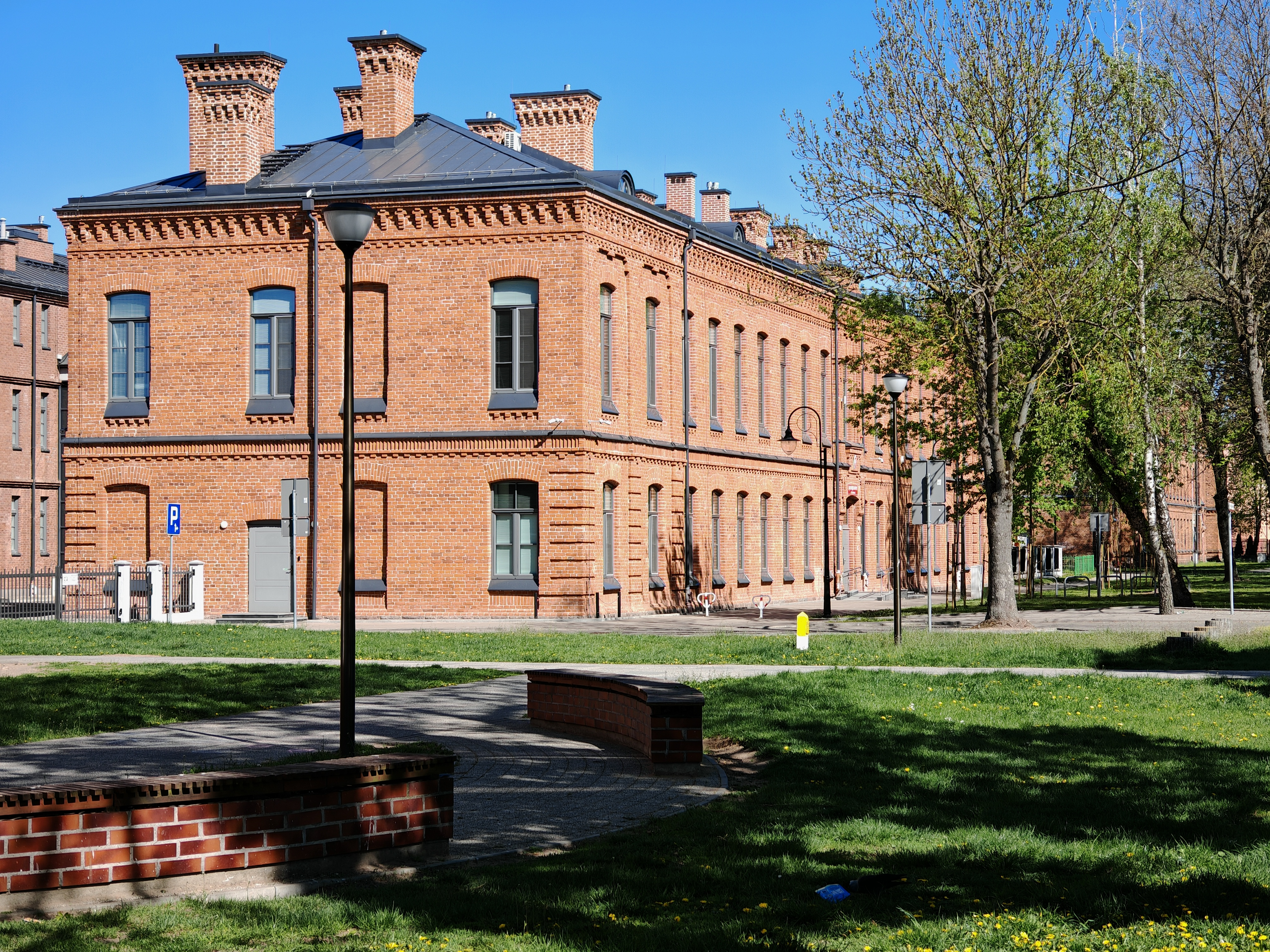
District Court

== Transport ==
The S8 expressway bypasses Zambrów to the west. Exits Zambrów Wschód / Zachód allow for fast access to Białystok and Warsaw.

National road 66 links Zambrów to Bielsk Podlaski to the south-east.

National road 63 links Zambrów to Siedlce to the south and to Łomża to the north-west.

The nearest railway station to Zambrów is in the town of Czyżew.

Flixbus operate coaches to Białystok and Warsaw.

== Sports ==
The local football club is Olimpia Zambrów. It competes in the lower leagues.

== Notable people ==
- Marta Bartel (born 1988), chess player, Woman Grandmaster
- Shlomo Goren (1917–94), Chief Rabbi of Israel, head of the Military Rabbinate of the Israel Defense Forces
- Lech Kołakowski (born 1963), politician, member of the Polish Sejm
- Stefan Krajewski (born 1981), politician, member of the Polish Sejm, Minister of Agriculture and Rural Development
- Józef Michalik (born 1941), Roman Catholic archbishop, President of the Polish Episcopal Conference

== International relations ==
=== Twin towns — Sister cities ===
Zambrów is twinned with:

- Visaginas, Lithuania
