= 5th Legions' Infantry Regiment =

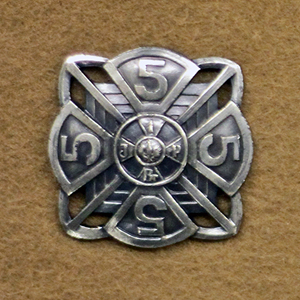
- Active: 1918 – 23 September 1939
- Country: Poland
- Role: Infantry
- Garrison/HQ: Vilnius
- Engagements: Polish-Ukrainian War: Battle of Przemyśl; Battle of Lemberg; Polish-Soviet War: Battle of Daugavpils; Kiev offensive; Battle of Warsaw (1920); World War II: Invasion of Poland

5th Legions Infantry Regiment of Józef Piłsudski (Polish: 5 Pułk Piechoty Legionów Józefa Piłsudskiego, abbreviated to 5 pp Leg.) was an infantry regiment of the Polish Army in 1918–1939. It was garrisoned in Vilnius as part of the 1st Legions Infantry Division.

== Formation ==
In the final days of October 1918 in Kraków, officers and soldiers of the former Polish Legions, commanded by Captain Michał Karaszewicz-Tokarzewski, decided to form an Infantry Regiment, in order to help Polish defenders of the city of Lwów, besieged by the Ukrainians.

== Polish–Ukrainian War ==
On November 10, 1918, the regiment's first battalion, under Major Julian Stachiewicz, left Kraków for Przemyśl, to be immediately involved in heavy fighting against the Ukrainians. By November 12, Przemyśl was completely in Polish hands, so the regiment's battalions were sent to Lwów. By November 22, the enemy was pushed out of the city.

Fighting around Lwów continued until early spring 1919, and the regiment remained in the area of the city until March/April 1919, when it was transferred to Ostrów Mazowiecka, where it joined the 1st Legions Infantry Division, and was sent to the Lithuanian-Belarusian front.

== Polish–Soviet War ==
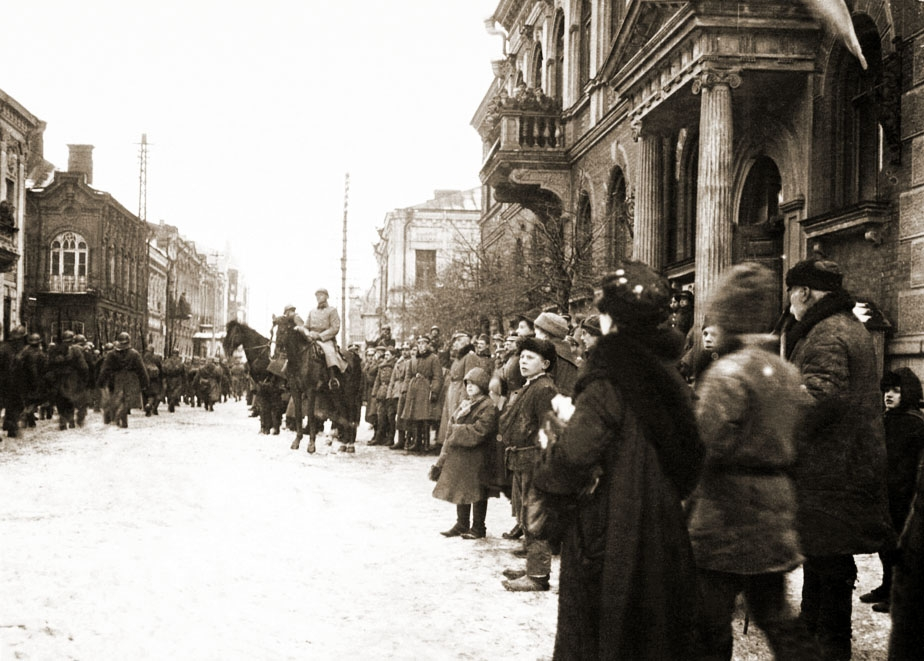
5th Legions' Infantry Regiment in Daugavpils (Latvia)

On April 17, 1919, the 5th Legions Infantry Regiment occupied the rail junction of Lida, and continued fighting near Vilnius until late summer. By September 1919, it reached the Daugava line, where it remained until winter. On January 3, 1920, the regiment crossed the frozen Daugava, to encircle Soviet garrison of Daugavpils.

In April 1920, the regiment left Daugavpils, and was transported southwards, to Ukraine. On April 26, 1920, it captured Zhytomyr, and on May 8 entered Kyiv, to remain there until June 10. During the Polish retreat westwards, the regiment clashed several times with the Red Army, to finally fight in the Polish counteroffensive of August 1920. By late August 1920, it recaptured Parczew, Biała Podlaska, Białystok (see Battle of Białystok). It invaded Lithuania, taking over Sejny. On October 14, 1920, the day of the Polish–Soviet armistice, the regiment reached Minsk.

Losses of the 5th Legions Infantry Regiment during the war were heavy: 29 officers and 308 soldiers KIA, and 1,039 WIA. In recognition of its bravery, the regiment was awarded Silver Cross of the Virtuti Militari.

== Second Polish Republic ==
In March 1921, the regiment was sent to the Lithuania–Poland border, where it remained until July. Between July 1921 and October 1922, it stayed in former Russian barracks at Lida, from where it was finally moved to Vilnius' Šnipiškės eldership. The regiment kept the traditions of the Polish Legions, with special cult of Józef Piłsudski, whose birthday (March 19) was celebrated by the soldiers and officers. In 1937, the regiment was named after Piłsudski, and it celebrated its holiday on July 4, the anniversary of the Battle of Kostiuchnowka.

Since the 5th Legions Infantry Regiment of Józef Piłsudski was regarded as an elite unit, it case of war it was mobilized in the first wave. Due to this fact it had a surplus of approximately 400 soldiers, compared to regular regiments. The recruits came mostly from central and western provinces of the Second Polish Republic. During the May Coup of 1926, a 220-strong detachment of the regiment took active part in fighting on the streets of Warsaw, with 10 soldiers killed. A delegation of soldiers and officers took part in the funeral of Józef Piłsudski in Warsaw and Kraków, and on May 30, 1935, the urn with Pilusdski's heart was carried by four regimental officers on the streets of Wilno.

In the interwar period, the regiment, whose nickname was "Courageous" ("Zuchowaci"), continued the traditions of Michał Gedeon Radziwiłł's regiment, which in the 1812 French invasion of Russia was part of French 1st Corps of Louis-Nicolas Davout.

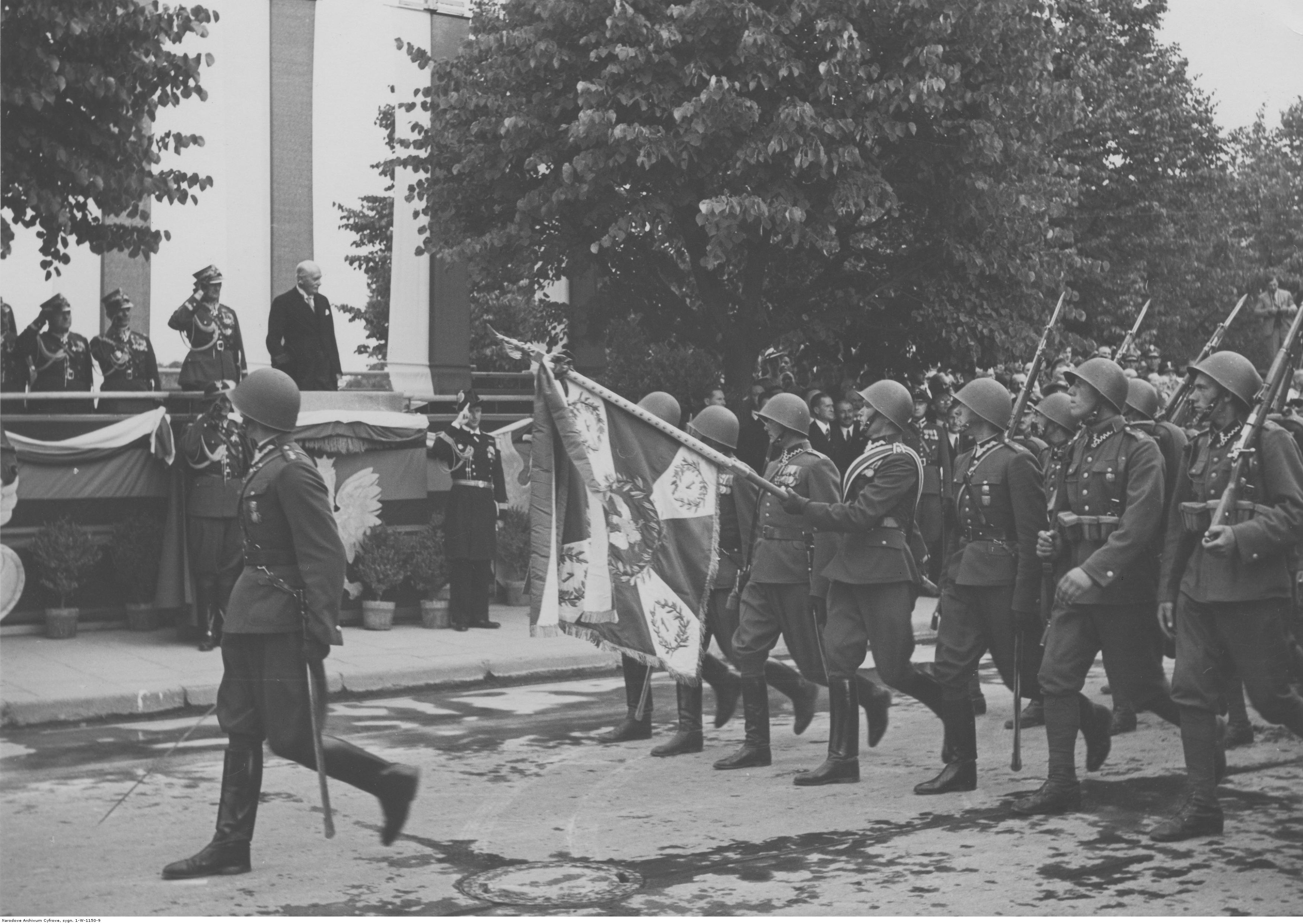
Military parade for the 25th anniversary of Polish Legions in August 1939

On March 22, 1939, regimental officers, who were taking part in winter exercises near Vilnius, were recalled to the city by General Wincenty Kowalski, commandant of the 1st Legions Infantry Division. Partial mobilization of the Polish Army was announced to them. In early August, eighteen regimental gunners took part in top secret testing of the Wz. 35 anti-tank rifle. Summer exercises were cancelled, and a number of reservists were called into service.

On August 15, the Armed Forces Day, after a field service on Marshal Pilsudski Square in Vilnius, a military parade took place, with President Ignacy Mościcki present. On August 24, alarm mobilization was announced by Colonel Kazimierz Babinski, the regiment's commander. The regiment completed the mobilization on August 26, and on the next day's evening, it marched in silence before Pilsudski's tomb at Rasos Cemetery. Soon afterwards, the regiment was loaded on a train, and in the night of August 27/28, it left towards Grodno. Together with whole 1st Legions Infantry Division, the concentration area was located between the Bug and the Narew, in Puszcza Biała's forests.

== 1939 Invasion of Poland ==
The 1st Legions Infantry Division, together with the 5th Legion's Infantry Regiment, belonged to Operational Group Wyszków, which since September 3 was commanded by General Wincenty Kowalski. The task of the Wyszków Group was either to attack the wing of the advancing Wehrmacht, or defend the line of the Narew river.

On September 5, the regiment clashed for the first time with the enemy, along the upper Narew. In the morning of September 7, German motorized units and infantry managed to cross the shallow river. In the ensuing battle, both sides suffered heavy losses, and the Poles lost 200 KIA. In the afternoon of September 7, the regiment was ordered to withdraw behind the Bug river, to defend its line, together with the town of Wyszków.

The German attack began in the morning of September 9, and was repelled by the Poles, but soon afterwards, Polish Army Headquarters ordered another retreat, towards Biała Podlaska and southeastern corner of the country. Altogether, the 5th Legions Infantry Regiment suffered heavy losses in the battles of the first nine days of the war. These losses reached up to 35% of manpower.

On September 12–13, the 1st Legions Infantry Division fought in the fierce Battle of Seroczyn, against Panzer Division Kempf. Surrounded by the enemy, the survivors decided to break through to Warsaw, but failed to do so. Elements of the division on September 15 reached Radzyń Podlaski, and on September 17, the forests near Włodawa. Finally, on September 18 near Chełm, all survivors of the 1st and 3rd Legions Infantry Division were merged into one unit, totalling 6,000 soldiers. In the night of September 18/19, the new division began to march southwards, to the Hungarian border.

Remnants of the 5th Legions Infantry Regiment surrendered on September 23 in the evening, near Zamość.

== Commandants ==
- Captain Michał Karaszewicz-Tokarzewski (1 XI 1918 – 28 II 1919)
- Major Stefan Dąb-Biernacki (1 III – 1 IX 1919)
- Major Jerzy Dobrodzicki (2 IX 1919 – 12 VI 1920)l
- Captain Stanisław Skwarczyński (12 VI – 4 VII 1920)
- Captain Eugeniusz Wyrwinski (5 VII – 4 VIII 1920)
- Major Kazimierz Hozer (5 VIII – 22 VIII 1920)
- Colonel Stanislaw Skwarczynski (23 VIII 1920 – 19 III 1927)
- Major Teodor Furgalski (20 III 1927 – 2 III 1932)
- Colonel Tadeusz Pełczyński (III 1932 – X 1935)
- Colonel Michal Bialkowski (l X 1935 – 14 XI 1938 )
- Colonel Kazimierz Babinski (15 XI 1938 – 14 IX 1939)

== Symbols ==
The regiment's flag, funded by the Vilnius' Polish Women's Association, was presented on December 3, 1920, in Maladzyechna. The ceremony was attended by Józef Piłsudski, and on the same day, the flag was decorated with the Virtuti Militari.

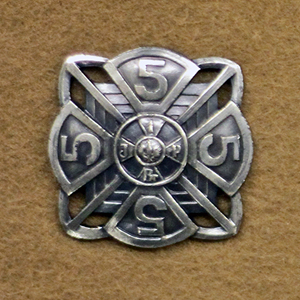

The flag featured silver Polish Eagle, with the inscription HONOUR AND FATHERLAND and names and dates of major battles (KRZYWOPLOTY 15. 18.XI.1914, LOWCZOWEK 22. 25.XII.1914, KONARY V.1915, KOSTIUCHNOWKA 4.5.VII.1916, LWOW 23.XI.1918 1.III.1919, WILNO 19.IV.1919, DZWINSK 28.IX.1919, BORODZIANKA ll.12.VI.1920, LIDA 28.29.IX.1920). A copy of the flag, made in the 1930s, is now kept at Polish Army Museum in Warsaw.

The badge, approved in December 1921, featured a Jagiellonian Eagle with number 5. On the wing of the cross were the dates 1914 1915 1916 1917. In 1938, the badge was awarded to the city of Lwów.

== Sources ==
- Tadeusz Jurga, Władysław Karbowski, Armia "Modlin" 1939, Wydawnictwo Ministerstwa Obrony Narodowej, Warszawa 1987
- Dariusz Faszcza: Zarys historii wojennej pułków polskich w kampanii wrześniowej. 5 pułk piechoty Legionów. Pruszków: Oficyna Wydawnicza Ajaks, 1994

== See also ==
- 1939 Infantry Regiment (Poland)
