= 6th Legions' Infantry Regiment =

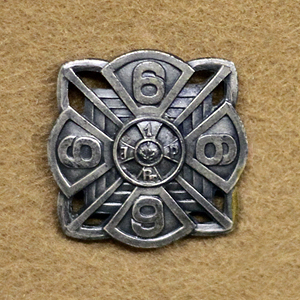
- Active: 27 July 1915 – July 1917; January 1919 – 1939
- Country: Austria-Hungary (1914-1917); Poland (1919-1939)
- Role: Infantry
- Garrison/HQ: Rozprza
- Engagements: World War I: Brusilov offensive; Battle of Kostiuchnówka; Polish-Soviet War: Battle of Daugavpils; Kiev offensive; Polish–Ukrainian War; World War II: Invasion of Poland; Battle of Kałuszyn; Battle of Wólka Węglowa

6th Legions Infantry Regiment of Józef Piłsudski (Polish: 6 Pulk Piechoty Legionow Jozefa Pilsudskiego, 6 pp Leg.) was an infantry regiment of the Polish Legions and the Polish Army. It existed from 1915 until 1939. Garrisoned in the city of Wilno, it was part of the 1st Legions Infantry Division.

== World War I ==
The regiment was formed upon the order of the Command of Polish Legions, on July 27, 1915, in Rozprza near Piotrków Trybunalski.

On September 10, 1915, the regiment headed to Volhynia, as part of the 3rd Brigade. In the autumn of that year, it fought in the area of Maniewicze and Kostiuchnowka, and during the Brusilov Offensive (July 1916) defended the so-called Polish Hill in Volhynia.

In July 1917, after the Oath crisis, the regiment was dissolved.

== Polish – Soviet War ==
The 6th Legions Infantry Regiment was re-created in early 1919 in Radom. On January 9, 1919, it was sent to the Polish–Ukrainian War in former Austrian Galicia, to defend the strategic rail line between Przemyśl and Lwów. In April 1919 it was moved to Lida and then Wilno.

The regiment fought in the Battle of Daugavpils, and in spring 1920, it became part of the army group sent to Ukraine for the Kiev offensive. During Polish retreat in early summer 1920, the regiment suffered heavy losses. It fought in the Polish counterattack of August 1920, reaching Lida on September 27.

On December 3, 1920, in Molodeczno, Józef Piłsudski decorated the flag of the regiment with Silver Cross of the Virtuti Militari.

Following the order of Polish Ministry of Military Affairs of 1930, the regiment was regarded as a reinforced unit (with app. 500 soldiers more than a regular infantry regiment), mobilized in the first wave.

== 1939 Invasion of Poland ==
During the September Campaign, the regiment was part of the 1st Legions Infantry Division, which belonged to Operational Group Wyszków. On September 8, the flag of the regiment, together with other symbols, was transported to Warsaw, and deposited at the Józef Piłsudski Museum in Belweder. The regiment was mobilized on August 24–27, 1939, and concentrated in Wilno. On September 1, 1939, it took the defensive positions along the Narew river, near the town of Różan.

6th Legions Infantry Regiment of Józef Piłsudski clashed for the first time with the advancing Wehrmacht on September 9, near Wyszków. The regiment was then ordered to retreat towards the Bug river, and in the night of September 11/12, it attacked German 44th Infantry Regiment, concentrated in Kałuszyn (see Battle of Kałuszyn ). Polish losses were heavy, and the enemy captured wounded commandant of the regiment, Colonel Stanislaw Engel.

In the night of September 13/14, the regiment clashed with SS Leibstandarte Deutschland in the village of Wola Wodynska. After a fierce clash, the survivors decided to march southwards. On September 18, it entered Parczew, and two days later, Chełm, to join forces with elements of Kraków Army. On September 22, the Germans sent a mission to the Poles, urging them to capitulate. German offer was refused, and the regiment continued its march to the Hungarian border.

In the morning of September 24, combined Polish forces attacked German positions in Suchowola. On the next day, after a clash near the village of Podklasztor, the regiment finally surrendered.

On November 11, 1966, the Polish government-in-exile honored the 6th Legions Infantry Regiment of Józef Piłsudski for extreme bravery of its soldiers during the 1939 campaign. According to estimates, the regiment lost 130 soldiers and officers KIA, with at least 250 WIA.

== Commandants ==
- Major Witold Scibor-Rylski (28 VII – 2 X 1915),
- Major Mieczyslaw Norwid-Neugebauer (6 X 1915 – 11 VII 1917),
- Colonel Witold Scibor-Rylski (28 VII – 20 VIII 1917),
- Colonel Boleslaw Popowicz (8 V 1919 – 15 VIII 1920),
- Colonel Stanislaw Jozef Kozicki (16 VIII 1920 – 17 VIII 1927),
- Colonel Stefan Leon Biestek (17 VIII 1927 – 12 XI 1935),
- Colonel Zygmunt Berling (13 XI 1935 – 2 IV 1937),
- Colonel Stanislaw Engel (3 IV 1937 – 12 IX 1939),
- Colonel Jan Kasztelowicz (since 12 IX 1939),

== Symbols ==
The badge, approved on December 13, 1921, featured a cross with Jagiellonian Eagle, the date 28 VII 1915 and the inscription 6 PP LP. Furthermore, it presented the names of battles: KOSTIUCHNOWKA, GÓRA POLAKÓW KAMIENIUCHA KUKLE – KOPNE.

== Sources ==
- Kazimierz Satora: Opowieści wrześniowych sztandarów. Warszawa: Instytut Wydawniczy Pax, 1990
- Zdzisław Jagiełło: Piechota Wojska Polskiego 1918–1939. Warszawa: Bellona, 2007

== See also ==
- 1939 Infantry Regiment (Poland)
