= 1st Legions Infantry Division =

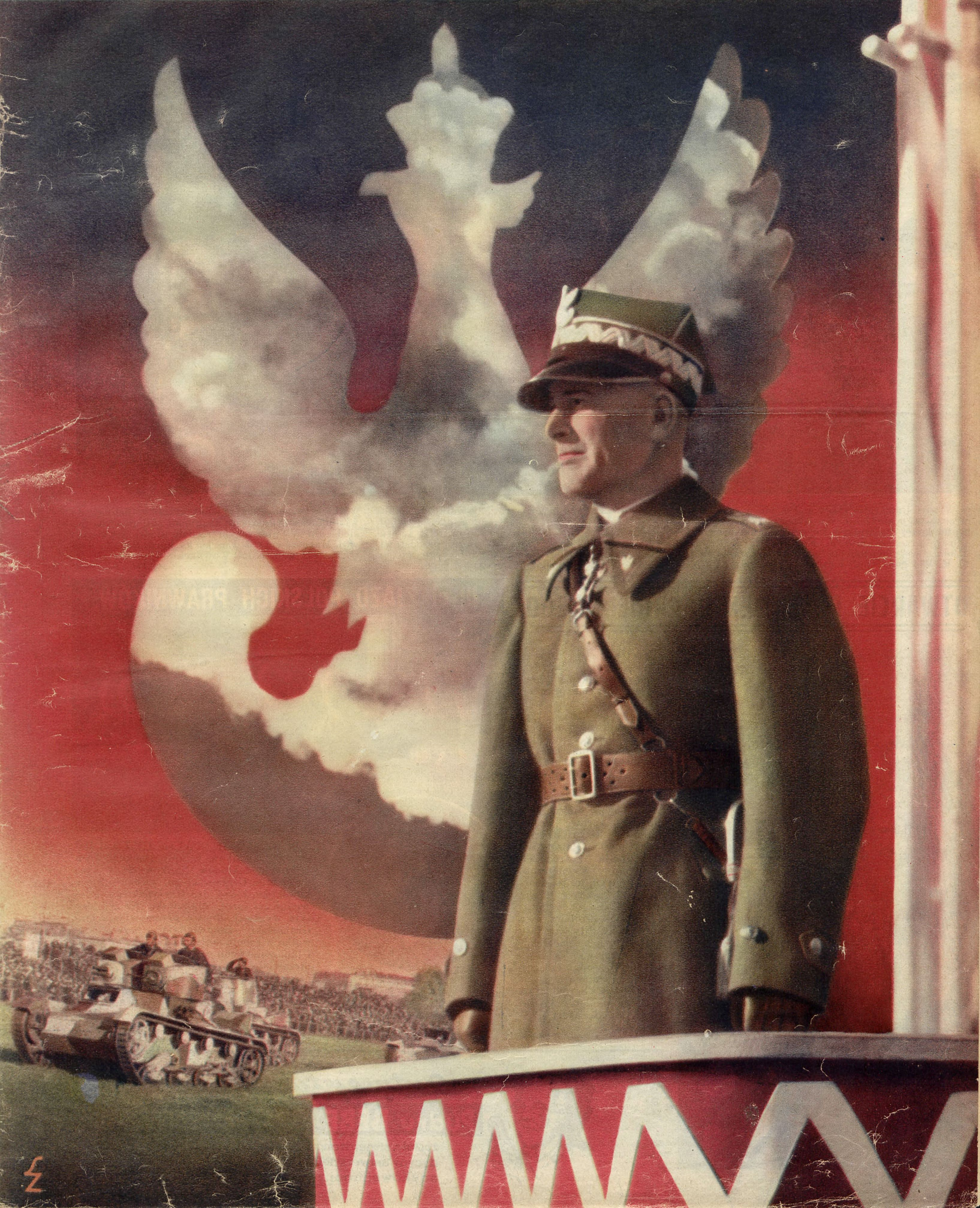
- First commander of the division, Edward Rydz-Śmigły
- Active: 1919–1939; 2023–present
- Country: Poland
- Branch: Land forces
- Type: Infantry
- Size: ca. 16,000 men
- Garrison/HQ: Vilnius (1919–1939); Ciechanów (2022–present)
- Nickname: Iron Division
- Patron: Józef Piłsudski
- March: March of the First Brigade
- Engagements: Dyneburg, Kiev offensive, Battle of Warsaw, Invasion of Poland

Commanders
- Current commander: Brig. General Norbert Iwanowski
- Notable commanders: Edward Rydz-Śmigły, Wincenty Kowalski

Insignia
- Unit abbreviation: 1 DPLeg
- Parent Unit: Wyszków
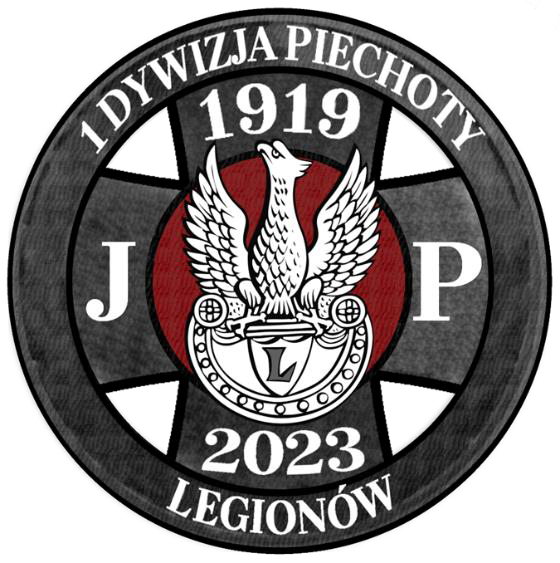
- Distinctive unit insignia (since 2025)

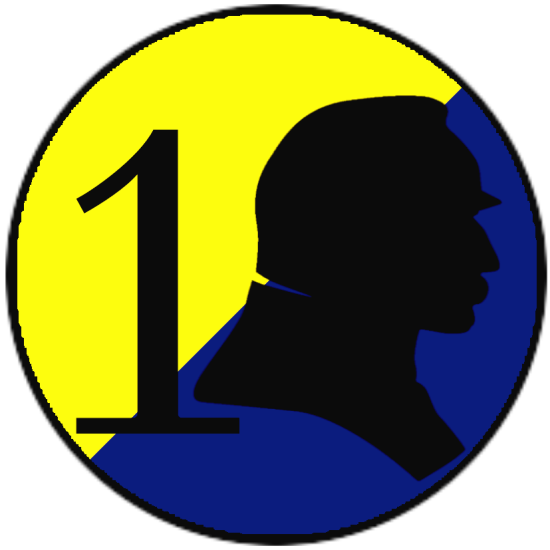
- Shoulder sleeve insignia (since 2025)

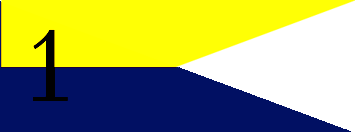
- Beret flash (since 2025)

The Polish 1st Legions Infantry Division (1. Dywizja Piechoty Legionów) is a tactical formation of the Polish Army. The division was formed on 20 February 1919 with veterans of the Polish Legions in World War I, whose traditions it carries. The division saw extensive combat during the Polish–Soviet War. Afterwards the division served with the Polish Army of the Second Polish Republic. In 1939, the division fought against Wehrmacht forces during the German Invasion of Poland.

== History ==
=== 1919–1944 ===
As one of the most experienced and best equipped Polish divisions, it fought in many of the most notable battles of the Polish–Soviet War of 1919 and 1920. Among them was occupying Vilnius and Battle of Dyneburg in Daugavpils, Latvia (as part of Rydz-Śmigły's Third Army and under his personal command, although the actual commanding officer was Michał Karaszewicz-Tokarzewski). During the Kiev offensive of spring of 1920, the division formed the core of Rydz-Śmigły Operational Group and took part in the battle of Zhytomyr (April 25), capturing the city of Kiev itself (May 7). After the Polish withdrawal, the unit took part in heavy retreat battles and shielded the retreat of the rest of the Polish forces. After several clashes with the 1st Cavalry Army, the division broke off and reached the area of the Wieprz River, from where it started the counter-offensive during the Battle of Warsaw (see Battle of Dęblin and Mińsk Mazowiecki). On the second day of the Polish offensive, August 16, the division managed to outflank the Bolshevik Mozyr Group by a forced march of over 56 kilometres. After that the division, commanded by Stefan Dąb-Biernacki, was attached to the Second Army and took part in the second biggest battle of the war, the Battle of the Niemen River. During the battle, the unit formed the core of the Wilno Group and took part in a successful outflanking manoeuvre of the Bolshevik forces centered on the city of Grodno.

After that the division was moved to the rear and took part in shielding the border with Lithuania during Żeligowski's Mutiny. After the war, the division was partially demobilized and stationed in Vilnius as an en cadre divisional core. In the Second Polish Republic, the division consisted of three infantry regiments (1st, 5th, and 6th; all garrisoned in Vilnius), and other units, such as light and heavy artillery regiments, a company of cyclists, military engineers, and a mounted squadron.

Before the outbreak of World War II, the division, commanded by General Wincenty Kowalski, was partially mobilized in March 1939. As a part of the Wyszków Operational Group it was to shield the northern approaches of Warsaw from the German assault from East Prussia. After the outbreak of the Invasion of Poland, the division became fully mobilized and on 4 September 1939, it made contact with enemy troops in the forests around Długosiodło. On 7 September it took part in heavy fighting near Pułtusk, but was outnumbered 3 to 1 and ordered to retreat southwards to defend the Bug River line between Kamieńczyk and Wyszków. Reinforced by 98th Heavy Artillery Detachment and 61st Light Artillery Detachment, the division successfully repelled a German assault near Brańszczyk, after which it began delaying actions while retreating towards Kałuszyn. On 11 September that town was seized by German units and had to be retaken by force during heavy street fighting in the dark.

From there, General Wincenty Kowalski planned a counter-assault of his division. In what became known as the Battle of Kałuszyn, on 13 September, the division started an all-out assault on German positions in nearby villages. After heavy fighting, the division broke through the third line of German defences in the villages of Lipiny, Debowiec, Wola Wodyńska, and Oleśnica. It finally broke through the German lines at Jagodno, but also suffered heavy casualties and lost most of its artillery and logistical support. Dispersed units crossed the German lines and joined several different Polish units, some of them formed ad hoc. The biggest group was rallied by the division commander but now numbered only three infantry companies out of an original three regiments. These troops broke through the forests near Radzyń Podlaski to reach the units of Gen. Stefan Dąb-Biernacki and on 22 September took part in the successful Battle of Falków against parts of the German 8th Infantry Division. Shortly afterward the division effectively ceased to exist.

=== Order of Battle ===
- Polish 1st Legions Infantry Regiment – Col. Kazimierz Burczak
- Polish 5th Legions Infantry Regiment – Lt.Col. Kazimierz Bąbiński
- Polish 6th Legions Infantry Regiment – Col. Stanisław Engel
- Polish 1st Legions Light Artillery Regiment – Lt. Col. Mieczysław Podlewski
- 1st Heavy Artillery Detachment – Maj. Władysław Świderski
- 1st Battalion of Engineers – Capt. Tadeusz Wejtko
- 1st Motorized AA Battery – 1st Lieut. Stefan Osostowicz
- Telephone company – Capt. Mika (?)
- Organic cavalry squadron – Maj. Bronisław Kulik
- 31st company of taczanka HMG – 1st Lieut. Stanisław Kasprzyk
- 31st Bicycle company – 1st Lieut. Jerzy Niemcewicz
- tabors and services

=== 2022 – present ===
As a reaction to the Russian invasion of Ukraine of 2022, the Polish Ministry of National Defense decided to revive the unit. On 9 January 2023 Minister of National Defense Mariusz Błaszczak announced that the 1st Legions Infantry Division will be revived as an addition to the 16th Mechanized Division, stationed in Warmia-Masuria and 18th Mechanized Division, stationed in Masovia. The 1DPLeg will be the fifth mechanized division of the Polish Armed Forces.

The headquarters of the revived 1DPLeg are in Ciechanów

== Mission ==
The 1st Legions Infantry Division is tasked to complement the defence of the Belarus–Poland border alongside the 16th Mechanised Division and the 18th Infantry Division. Polish Defence Minister Mariusz Błaszczak stated that the formation is to "saturate" eastern Poland.

As an organised military formation, the 1st Legions Infantry Division is also tasked to support the Department for Civil Protection and Crisis Management in case of emergency.

== Organisation ==
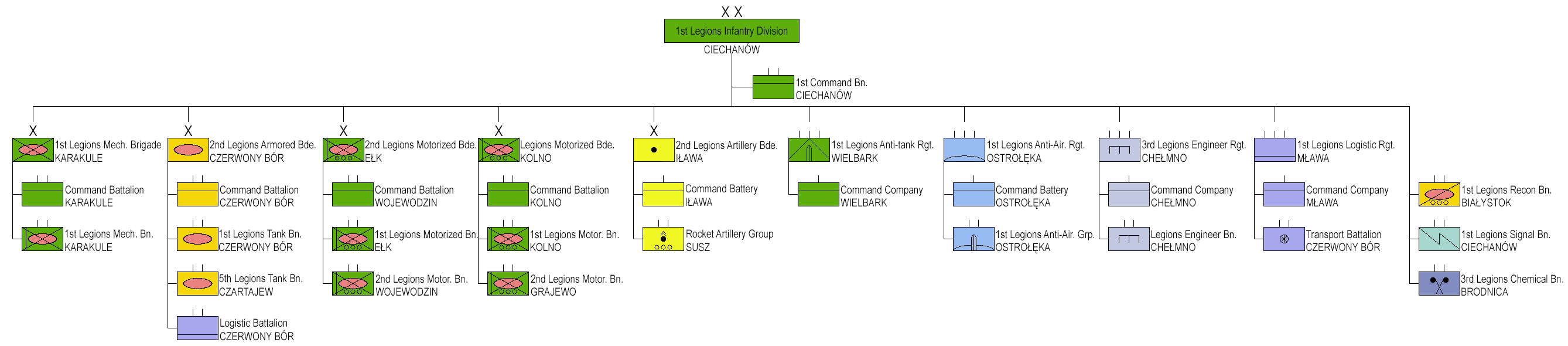
1st Legions Infantry Division organisation 2025

1st Legions Infantry Division locations 2025

The 1st Legions Infantry Division is to include a total of four brigades, which will consist of four maneuver battalions, one artillery battalion, one anti-aircraft battalion, one logistic battalion, and support companies. The division will be the largest Polish formation and equipped with Polish and South Korean equipment. As of 2025 the 1st Legions Infantry Division consists of the following units:

- 1st Legions Infantry Division "Marshal Józef Piłsudski", in Ciechanów
  - 1st Command Battalion, in Ciechanów
  - 1st Legions Mechanized Brigade, in Karakule
    - Command Battalion, in Karakule
    - 1st Legions Mechanized Battalion, in Karakule
  - 2nd Legions Armored Brigade, in Czerwony Bór
    - Command Battalion, in Czerwony Bór
    - 1st Legions Tank Battalion, in Czerwony Bór
    - 5th Legions Tank Battalion, in Czartajew
    - Logistic Battalion, in Czerwony Bór
  - 2nd Legions Motorized Brigade, in Ełk
    - Command Battalion, in Wojewodzin
    - 1st Legions Motorized Battalion, in Ełk
    - 2nd Legions Motorized Battalion, in Wojewodzin
  - Legions Motorized Brigade, in Kolno (forming)
    - Command Battalion, in Kolno
    - 1st Legions Motorized Battalion, in Kolno
    - 2nd Legions Motorized Battalion, in Grajewo
  - 2nd Legions Artillery Brigade, in Iława
    - Command Battery, in Iława
    - Rocket Artillery Group, in Susz with Homar-K multiple rocket launchers
  - 1st Legions Anti-Tank Regiment, in Wielbark
    - Command Company, in Wielbark
  - 1st Legions Anti-Aircraft Regiment, in Ostrołęka
    - Command Battery, in Ostrołęka
    - 1st Legions Anti-Aircraft Group, in Ostrołęka
  - 3rd Legions Engineer Regiment, in Chełmno
    - Command Company, in Chełmno
    - Legions Engineer Battalion, in Chełmno
  - 1st Legions Logistic Regiment, in Mława
    - Command Company
    - Transport Battalion, in Czerwony Bór
  - 1st Legions Reconnaissance Battalion, in Białystok
  - 1st Legions Signal Battalion, in Ciechanów
  - 3rd Legions Chemical Battalion, in Brodnica
  - 1st Division Training Center, in Czerwony Bór
  - 2nd Division Training Center, in Ślubowo

== Equipment ==
The 1st Legions Infantry Division does not deploy Soviet equipment. The Mechanized Brigades are equipped with K2 Black Panther and M1A2 Abrams SEP V3 main battle tanks; the artillery units are equipped with K9 Thunder and AHS Krab howitzers.

The co-presence of M1 Abrams and K2 Black Panther main battle tanks is a departure from the equipment of both the 16th Mechanized Division, which relies on Korean tanks, and the 18th Mechanized Division, which is equipped with M1 Abrams.

The formation will also have the Gladius unmanned aerial reconnaissance and strike systems.

== See also ==
- Polish army order of battle in 1939
- Polish contribution to World War II
- List of Polish divisions in World War II

== Bibliography ==
- Seidner, Stanley S. Marshal Edward Śmigły-Rydz Rydz and the Defense of Poland, New York, 1978.
- Lech Wyszczelski: Wojsko Polskie w latach 1918-1921. Warszawa: Wydawnictwo Neriton, 2006
- Zdzisław Jagiełło: Piechota Wojska Polskiego 1918-1939. Warszawa: Bellona, 2007
