= Jedlina =

Jedlina may refer to places in Poland:

- Jedlina, Masovian Voivodeship, a village
- Jedlina, Silesian Voivodeship, a village
- Jedlina-Zdrój, a town in the Lower Silesian Voivodeship
