= Wincenty Kowalski =

Polish general (1892–1984)

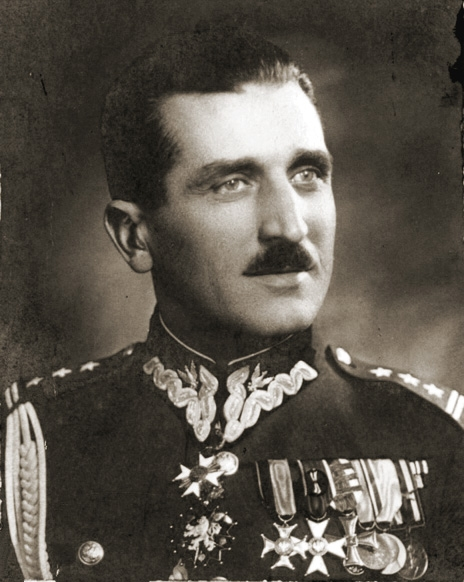

Executive Director of the Józef Piłsudski Institute of America
- In office 1956–1963
- Preceded by: Damian Stanisław Wandycz
- Succeeded by: Wacław Jędrzejewicz

Personal details
- Born: 11 September 1892 Warsaw, Congress Poland
- Died: 29 November 1984 (aged 92) River Forest, Illinois

Wincenty Kowalski (1892–1984) was a Polish military commander and a general of the Polish Army. A veteran of both World War I and World War II, he fought in all the inter-war conflicts of Poland. During the Invasion of Poland of 1939 he commanded the Polish 1st Legions Infantry Division.

== Biography ==
Wincenty Kowalski was born on 11 September 1892 in Warsaw to a family of humble workers. After graduating from a lyceum of Stanisław Konarski, he joined the high school of Hipolit Wawelberg, the only institution of higher education in Warsaw to allow Polish language (though not openly). Afterwards he moved to Liège in Belgium, where he graduated from the Machinery Building faculty of the Polytechnical Institute. During that time he joined the Związek Walki Czynnej, a secret Polish anti-tsarist organization preparing the cadres for a future anti-Russian uprising aimed at liberation of Poland. He was also a member and a tutor of the Związek Strzelecki (ZS). Drafted into the Russian Army, between 1912 and 1913 he studied at the Officers' School of Artillery in Smolensk. After that he moved to Austro-Hungarian Galicia, where he settled in Kraków. There he continued his military training at the NCO and officers' school of the ZS.

After the outbreak of the Great War, in August 1914 he joined the Polish Legions. Initially a member of the legendary 1st Cadre Company, with time he became a battalion commander within the 1st Legions Infantry Regiment. After the Oath Crisis of 1917 he was interned in Beniaminów, along with most of the Legionaries with official Russian citizenship. In November 1918, after Poland regained her independence, he joined the newly formed Polish Army and was promoted to the rank of first lieutenant. As one of the first experienced officers to join the army, he was immediately dispatched to Lwów, where he took part in the battle for that city and the Polish-Ukrainian War. He also fought with distinction in the Polish-Bolshevik War, for which he was promoted to the rank of captain (in 1919) and then major (1920).

After the Peace of Riga he remained in active service. Initially both a tutor and a student at the Centre for Infantry Training in Rembertów, with time he became one of the professors of the Warsaw-based Higher War School. After finishing his studies he was promoted to the rank of lieutenant colonel in 1922 and then to colonel in 1928. After that he returned to active service in line units and served in a number of detachments based in Wilno and Modlin, among them the Wilno Fortified Camp (since 1932). Between 1937 and 1938 he served as the commanding officer of the 8th Infantry Division and then the garrison of the Modlin Fortress. As one of the more skilled Polish officers of the time, on 19 March 1939 he was promoted to the rank of brigadier general and became the commander of both the prestigious Polish 1st Legions Infantry Division and the Wyszków Operational Group formed around it.

After the outbreak of the Invasion of Poland in 1939, during the opening stages of World War II, Kowalski proved to be one of the most successful commanding officers in the Polish Army at that time. The units under his command entered in contact with the enemy on 4 September in the forests around Długosiodło, to the north of Warsaw. Delaying the German forces in a number of skirmishes and battles along the Narew and near Różan, Kowalski's units managed to retain most of their combat readiness. After the battle for Pułtusk, on 7 September, the Poles were outnumbered 3:1 and ordered to retreat southwards. On the road Gen. Kowalski managed not only to withdraw most of his forces, but also to rally the defeated forces of Modlin Army and Independent Operational Group Narew crowded near the bridge in Wyszków. Thanks to Kowalski's actions, overnight 2 divisions and (33rd Infantry and 41st Infantry), as well as the Mazowiecka Cavalry Brigade were not only rallied but also safely transported to the other side of the Bug River.

Kowalski then withdrew with his forces to the area between Wyszków and Kamieńczyk, and organized a successful defence of the line there. After repelling a German assault on Brańszczyk, his forces started to slowly move southwards while performing delaying actions and keeping the combat readiness almost intact. After the German forces seized the town of Kałuszyn thus cutting out Kowalski's men from the safe passage towards the Romanian Bridgehead, on 13 September the division broke through enemy lines and retook the city in what became known as the battle of Kałuszyn. Despite heavy losses on the Polish side, Wincenty Kowalski managed to yet again rally a large part of his forces and continued his move towards Włodawa, Lublin and Lwów. Near Chełm, on September 18 and 19th Kowalski's division (then reduced to merely a regiment after two weeks of constant fights against numerically and technically superior enemy) was reorganized and reinforced with an improvised detachment under Stanisław Tatar. From there the division proceeded towards Tomaszów Lubelski. After a successful break through German panzers on 21 September and the German 8th Infantry Division in the battle of Falków the following day, the division arrived to the battlefield of the Battle of Tomaszów Lubelski. Outnumbered, lacking artillery, supplies, food and reduced to not more than a regiment, the division's assault on Tarnawatka was stopped on 23 September and wounded General Kowalski was taken prisoner of war by the Germans.

After half a year in a prison hospital, in early 1940 Kowalski was transported to Oflag VII-A Murnau POW camp, where he spent the entire war. Liberated by the forces of USA on 30 April 1945, Kowalski joined the Polish Army in the West. Demobilized in May 1946, he settled in London and then moved to New York. There he took active part in a variety of Polish organizations of the local Polish diaspora. Among his most notable deeds was organization of a funeral of Jan Lechoń, one of the most renowned Polish poets to die in exile. He was also the head of the Association of Polish Combatants, the Józef Piłsudski Institute of America () and the head of the Polish Brotherly Help, a non-profit venture aimed at helping the Polish political emigrants living in the United States. He died suddenly on 29 November 1984 in River Forest. Following his last will, on 6 September 1986 his ashes were buried at Kałuszyn war cemetery, among the fallen men of his division.

== Bibliography ==
=== In Polish ===
- "Kowalski Wincenty (1892–1984)". Gazeta Wyborcza (November 14). 2005.
- "Kampania wrześniowa 1939 roku – próba bilansu". Oblicza Historii (2/2004). 2004.
- "KOWALSKI, WINCENTY-". Wielka Encyklopedia PWN (web ed.). 2003.
- Zbigniew Mierzwiński (1990). Generałowie II Rzeczypospolitej. Warsaw, Polonia. ISBN 83-7021-096-1.
- Jacek Macyszyn (1999). Generałowie polscy. Pruszków, Ajaks. ISBN 83-87103-72-1.
- Kryska-Karski, Tadeusz; Żurakowski, Stanisław (1991). "Generałowie Polski niepodległej (English: Generals of Polish Independence)". Warszawa: Editions Spotkania.
