= Ludwika Róża Ossolińska =

Polish writer, poet and philanthropist

Ludwika Róża Ossolińska (August 25, 1797, Wyszków – February 11, 1850, Kraków), was a Polish writer, poet and philanthropist. She was a popular writer in Polish areas and mainly wrote children's stories.

When her mother died, she and her sister Julia were given by her father to a boarding school in Lviv. Due to a childhood illness, she remained disabled for the rest of her life. Józefa Morstin née Ossoliński took care of her.

She died on February 11, 1850, in Kraków and was buried there at the Rakowicki Cemetery. Almost all of her manuscripts were burnt down during the fire in Kraków in 1850. In the same year, Ossolińska's novels were published in Kraków, including Zosia's Adventures, and Christmas Carol and Tea in the Country.
