= Battle of Kałuszyn =

1939 battle of the Invasion of Poland

Coordinates: 52°12′30″N 21°48′42″E

- Part of Invasion of Poland
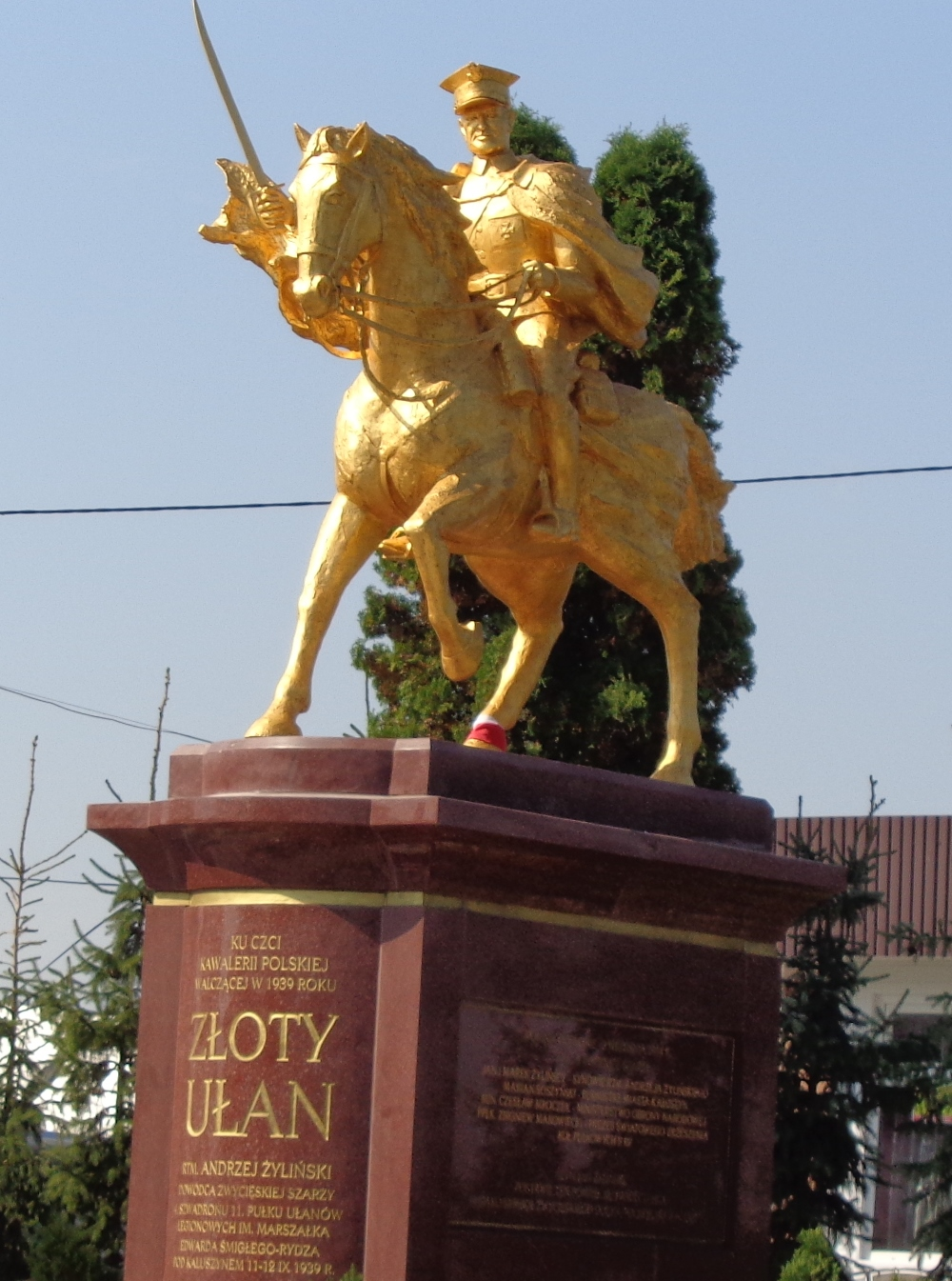
- Monument to battle at the Kałuszyn Cemetery
Date	11–12 September 1939
Location	Kałuszyn, Warsaw Voivodeship, Poland
Result	Polish victory

Belligerents
Poland	(Nazi Germany) Germany

Commanders and leaders
(Second Polish Republic) Andrzej Żyliński	(Nazi Germany) Maj. Krawutschke †

Strength
6th Legions' Infantry Regiment; 11th Legions Uhlan Regiment	44th Infantry Regiment

Casualties and losses
33+ killed	120 killed 200 wounded 84 missing

The Battle of Kałuszyn, took place between 11 and 12 September 1939 around the town of Kałuszyn near Mińsk Mazowiecki in Poland. It was part of the invasion of Poland at the start of World War II between forces of the Polish Army and the invading German Army.

== Prelude ==
Following the battle for the borders, the forces of General Wincenty Kowalski began a steady withdrawal and undertook delaying actions in the area to the north-east of Warsaw. Following the battles of Pułtusk and Różan, the Polish 1st Legions Infantry Division reinforced by the units of the Wyszków Operational Group arrived in the area of Mińsk Mazowiecki. They were overrun by the German forces of the German 11th Infantry Division who managed to take the town and surround the Polish forces.

== Battle ==
The Polish aim was to retake the town and break through the German encirclement before panzer reinforcements arrived and enemy resistance stiffened. After a short preparation, the battle began overnight with a Polish assault on the villages surrounding the town. The Polish forces managed to break through the positions of the enemy 44th Infantry Regiment, which was disorganized and had underestimated the Polish forces still present in the area.

At one point a Polish commander ordered the 4th squadron of the 11th Uhlans Regiment to advance towards the town itself. The order was mistakenly understood as an order of a cavalry charge and the squadron, numbering 85 men and commanded by Lieutenant Andrzej Żyliński, charged towards the enemy positions with their sabres drawn, breaking through to the town despite suffering significant casualties (33 dead). The Polish infantry followed into the breach in the German defences and by the early morning the town was liberated and the German division sent in retreat.

== Aftermath ==
Losses on both sides were significant. The commanding officer of 44th regiment, Major Krawutschke, committed suicide. In the course of the heavy fighting, the town was almost completely destroyed. Most of the substantial Jewish population of the town was deported by Germans to the Warsaw Ghetto or Treblinka extermination camp. After the end of the war the battle was one of 24 battles of the Polish Defensive War to be featured at the Tomb of Unknown Soldier in Warsaw.

== See also ==
- List of World War II military equipment of Poland
- List of German military equipment of World War II
