= Edward Grzymała =

Polish Roman Catholic priest and martyr

Edward Grzymala
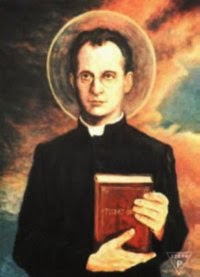
- Portrait of Blessed Edward Grzymala
- Born: September 29, 1906; Kołodziąż, Siedlce County
- Residence: Włocławek
- Died: August 10, 1940; Dachau concentration camp, Dachau, Germany
- Beatified: June 13, 1999, Warsaw, Poland by Pope John Paul II
- Feast: 12 June

Edward Grzymała (29 September 1906 – 10 August 1940) was a Polish and Roman Catholic priest. He was imprisoned in the Nazi concentration camp at Sachsenhausen. He died at the concentration camp in Dachau. In 1999, he was beatified by Pope John Paul II. He is one of the 108 Martyrs of World War II.

== See also ==
- List of Nazi-German concentration camps
- The Holocaust in Poland
- World War II casualties of Poland
