= Brodki =

- Village
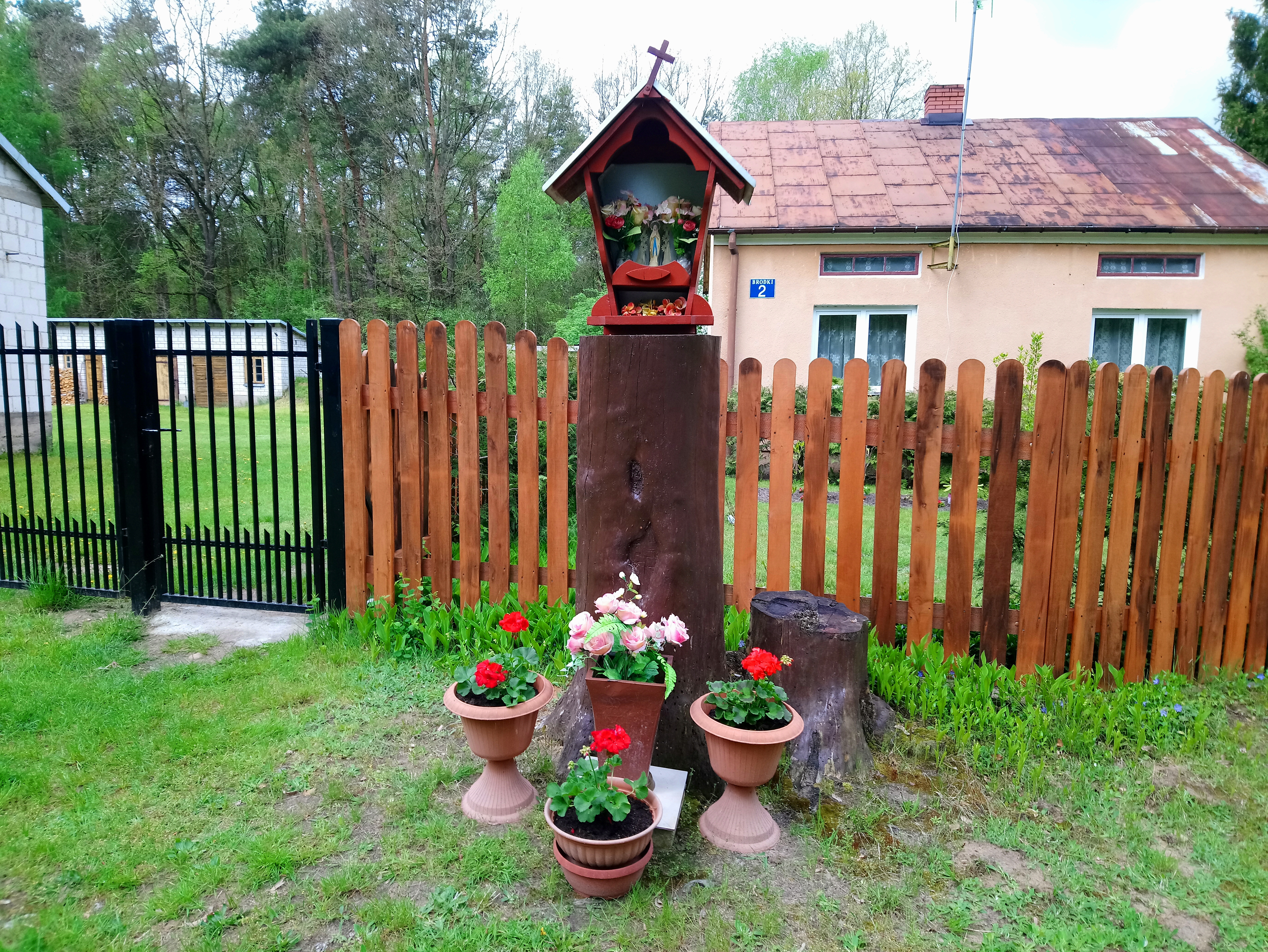

- Location within Poland
- Coordinates: 52°3′N 21°56′E
- Country: Poland
- Voivodeship: Masovian
- County: Siedlce
- Gmina: Wodynie
- Time zone: UTC+1 (CET)
  - Summer (DST): UTC+2 (CEST)
- Vehicle registration: WSI

Brodki [ˈbrɔtki] is a village in the administrative district of Gmina Wodynie, within Siedlce County, Masovian Voivodeship, in east-central Poland.
