= Rudnik Duży =

- Village
- Location within Poland
- Coordinates: 51°59′13″N 21°54′58″E
- Country: Poland
- Voivodeship: Masovian
- County: Siedlce
- Gmina: Wodynie

Rudnik Duży (Polish pronunciation: [ˈrudɲiɡ ˈduʐɨ]) is a village in the administrative district of Gmina Wodynie, within Siedlce County, Masovian Voivodeship, in east-central Poland.
