= Helenów, Gmina Wodynie =

Helenów
- Village
- Location within Poland
- Coordinates: 52°1′43″N 22°3′45″E
- Country: Poland
- Voivodeship: Masovian
- County: Siedlce
- Gmina: Wodynie

Helenów [xɛˈlɛnuf] is a village in the administrative district of Gmina Wodynie, within Siedlce County, Masovian Voivodeship, in east-central Poland.
