= Oleśnica, Masovian Voivodeship =

Oleśnica
- Village
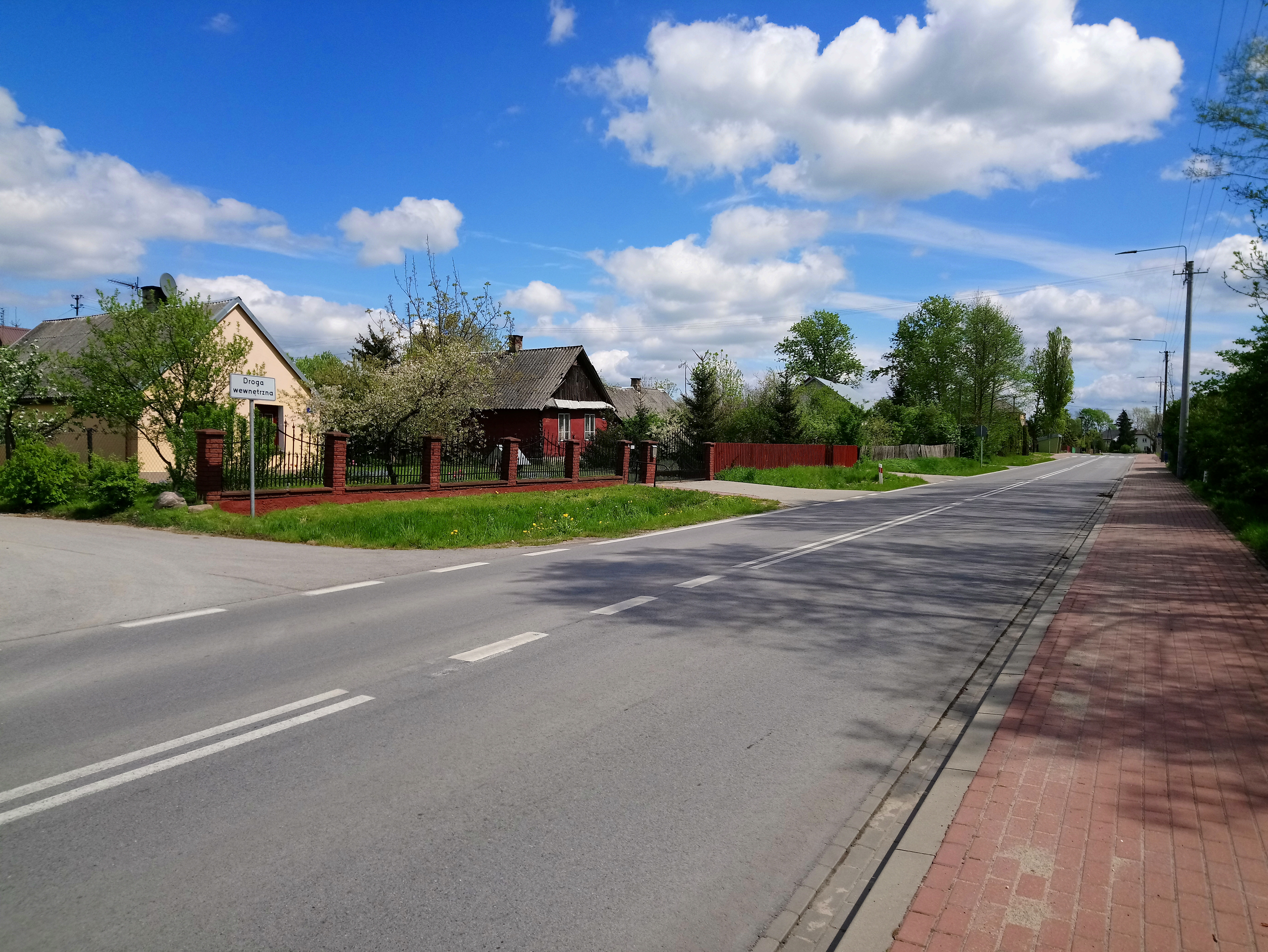

- Location within Poland
- Coordinates: 52°2′59″N 21°59′38″E
- Country: Poland
- Voivodeship: Masovian
- County: Siedlce
- Gmina: Wodynie
- Time zone: UTC+1 (CET)
  - Summer (DST): UTC+2 (CEST)

Oleśnica (Polish: [ɔlɛˈɕɲit͡sa]) is a village in the administrative district of Gmina Wodynie, within Siedlce County, Masovian Voivodeship, in east-central Poland.

Five Polish citizens were murdered by Nazi Germany in the village during World War II.
