= Rudnik Mały, Masovian Voivodeship =

Rudnik Mały
- Village
- Location within Poland
- Coordinates: 51°59′35″N 21°53′39″E
- Country: Poland
- Voivodeship: Masovian
- County: Siedlce
- Gmina: Wodynie

Rudnik Mały (Polish pronunciation: [ˈrudɲik ˈmawɨ]) is a village in the administrative district of Gmina Wodynie, within Siedlce County, Masovian Voivodeship, in east-central Poland.
