= 11th Legions Uhlan Regiment =

11th Legions Infantry Regiment of Marshal Edward Śmigły-Rydz (Polish: 11 Pułk Ułanów Legionowych im. Marszałka Edwarda Śmigłego-Rydza, 11 puł) was a cavalry unit of the Polish Army, which existed in 1918–1939. It fought in the Polish–Soviet War and the Invasion of Poland. In the Second Polish Republic, the regiment was garrisoned in Ciechanów, and in 1939, belonged to Mazowiecka Cavalry Brigade.

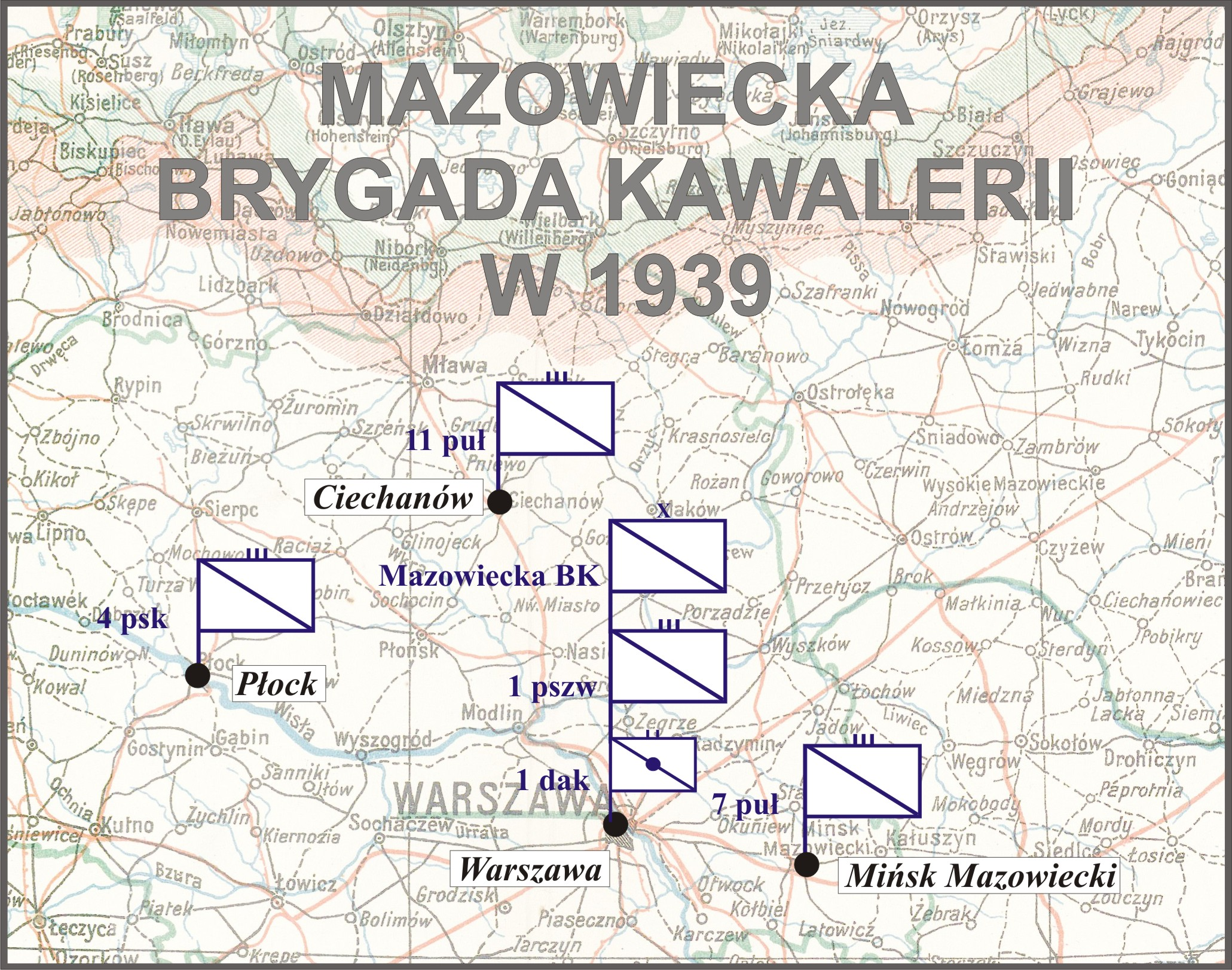
Mazowiecka BK w 1938

== Beginnings ==
In early November 1918 in Kraków, a group of officers of the dissolved 1st Legions Uhlan Regiment formed the so-called Squadron of Rotmistrz Jablonski. On November 17, the squadron, divided into three platoons, left its barracks at Rakowce near Kraków, and traveled by train to Przemyśl, where it merged with a local cavalry unit. The regiment then takes part in the Battle of Przemyśl (1918), with its elements entering Lwów

In late January 1919, the regiment was sent to Kraśnik for rest. In March, it was sent to Pińczów, where it the so-called Radom Squadron and Jędrzejów Squadron were merged with it. On February 19, 1919, Polish headquarters officially tasked Mariusz Zaruski with forming the regiment. Zaruski gathered cavalry squadrons from Kraśnik, Pińczów and Kielce. All concentrated in Pińczów. On March 16, 1919, Rotmistrz Antoni Jablonski was named first commandant of the regiment, and on April 7, 1919, following the order of Józef Piłsudski, the regiment was sent by rail to Wilno.

Uhlans of the 11th regiment captured Wilno on April 20, 1919, after heavy fighting against the Red Army. Two days later, the regiment marched towards Landwarów, to cover the Polish–Lithuanian demarcation line.

In August 1919, the regiment fought against the Soviets in Belarus. On August 20, together with 1st Chevau-léger Regiment, it captured Glebokie. By late August, it covered the line of the Daugava, repelling several Soviet counterattacks and remaining there until spring 1920.

In May 1920, Soviet counteroffensive in Belarus began. Outnumbered and outgunned Polish units were forced to retreat. On June 20, the regiment was loaded on a train at the rail station of Dukszty, and via Wilno-Baranowicze-Brzesc-Kowel traveled to Rowne, reaching its destination on June 21. In Volhynia, Polish uhlans faced the assault of 1st Cavalry Army, commanded by Semyon Budyonny. The regiment defended the line of the Horyn River, capturing Korzec on July 1. In mid-July it retreated westwards, fighting the enemy. On August 1, 1920, it clashed with Soviet cavalry near Mikolajow.

For the remaining part of the Polish–Soviet War, the regiment fought in eastern part of former Austrian Galicia, defending the approaches to Lwów, and Galician oil fields in the area of Drohobycz, Bobrka and Boryslaw. On September 7, 1920, as part of First Cavalry Brigade, it began to advance eastwards, fighting in Podolia. On October 22, 1920, Major Antoni Jablonski died in a hospital in Lwów.

== Second Polish Republic ==
On November 25, 1920, the regiment was sent to the barracks at Czortków, where it remained until June 1921. On June 12, 1921, the regiment was loaded on a train and headed to its new garrison in Ciechanów. Its three squadrons were sent to nearby Przasnysz, since there was not enough space at former Imperial Russian Army barracks in Ciechanów.

== 1939 Invasion of Poland ==
The regiment was mobilized on August 24, 1939, to join Mazowiecka Cavalry Brigade. On September 1, it manned a defensive line between Ciechanów and Przasnysz. Forced to retreat, it fought the Wehrmacht in several locations, including the Battle of Kałuszyn, in which it joined forces with 6th Legions Infantry Regiment. By September 24, it found itself near Suchowola, and its elements fought until September 27.

In 1944, the Home Army of District Siedlce – Węgrów recreated the 11th Regiment for Operation Tempest.

== Commandants ==
- Major Mariusz Zaruski (1919–1920)
- Rotmistrz Edward Kleszczynski (1920)
- Major Antoni Jablonski (1920)
- Rotmistrz Edward Kleszczynski (1920–1921)
- Major Ludwik Kmicic-Skrzynski (X 1921–X 1924)
- Colonel Sergiusz Zahorski (XI 1924–1926)
- Colonel Marian Mochnacki (1926–1927)
- Tomasz Dobrzamski (1927–1928)
- Colonel Konstanty Tatar-Ablamowicz (1928–1930)
- Colonel Piotr Glogowski (1930–1933)
- Colonel Stanislaw Klepacz (1933–1938)
- Colonel Wladyslaw Màczewski (1938–1939)

== Symbols ==
The regiment received its flag on October 5, 1919, during a ceremony in Wilno. The flag was funded by the residents of Wilno, and it presented Our Lady of the Gate of Dawn on one side, and symbols of Poland and Lithuania on the other. On March 22, 1922, names of locations of the battles were added to the flag: Kowalewszczyzna, Nowe Kruki, PeresΠawka, Szczelno, Tyszki, Perebrodzie, Rowne, Mikolajow, Ruzdwiany, Jampol, Nowa Sieniawka.

Regimental badge was in the shape of a silver cross, with dates 1809 1914 1918 1919 on its wings.

On May 28, 1937, Ministry of Military Affairs named the regiment after Marshal Edward Śmigły-Rydz.

The regiment had its own zurawiejka: "Half civilian, half military, this is the Legions eleventh regiment. They are carelessly sleeping on the border, the uhlans from Ciechanów".

== Sources ==
- Henryk Smaczny: Księga kawalerii polskiej 1914–1947: rodowody, barwa, broń. Warszawa: TESCO, 1989.

== See also ==
- Polish cavalry
