= Kaczory, Gmina Wodynie =

Kaczory
- Village
- Location within Poland
- Coordinates: 52°3′55″N 21°59′44″E
- Country: Poland
- Voivodeship: Masovian
- County: Siedlce
- Gmina: Wodynie

Kaczory [kaˈt͡ʂɔrɨ] is a village in the administrative district of Gmina Wodynie, within Siedlce County, Masovian Voivodeship, in east-central Poland.
