= Łomnica, Siedlce County =

Łomnica
- Village
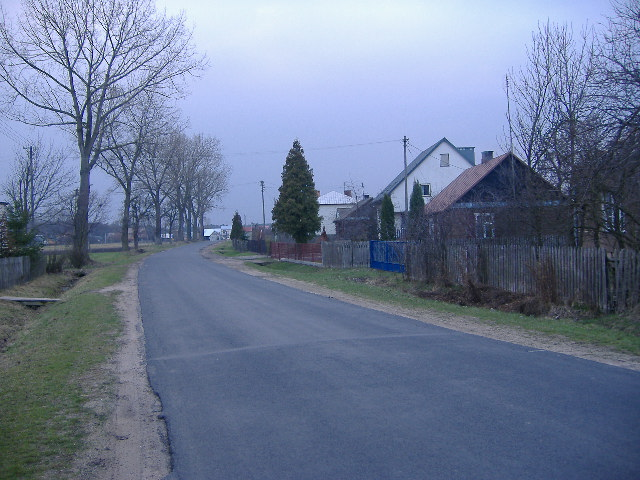

- Location within Poland
- Coordinates: 52°1′53″N 21°55′20″E
- Country: Poland
- Voivodeship: Masovian
- County: Siedlce
- Gmina: Wodynie

Population
  - Total: 147
- Time zone: UTC+1 (CET)
  - Summer (DST): UTC+2 (CEST)

Łomnica [wɔmˈnit͡sa] is a village in the administrative district of Gmina Wodynie, within Siedlce County, Masovian Voivodeship, in east-central Poland.

Six Polish citizens were murdered by Nazi Germany in the village during World War II.
