= Wola Serocka =

- Village
- Location within Poland
- Coordinates: 52°2′N 21°57′E
- Country: Poland
- Voivodeship: Masovian
- County: Siedlce
- Gmina: Wodynie

Wola Serocka [ˈvɔla sɛˈrɔt͡ska] is a village in the administrative district of Gmina Wodynie, within Siedlce County, Masovian Voivodeship, in east-central Poland.
