= Ruda Wolińska =

- Village
- Location within Poland
- Coordinates: 52°3′26″N 22°3′14″E
- Country: Poland
- Voivodeship: Masovian
- County: Siedlce
- Gmina: Wodynie
- Population: 179

Ruda Wolińska [ˈruda vɔˈliɲska] is a village in the administrative district of Gmina Wodynie, within Siedlce County, Masovian Voivodeship, in east-central Poland.
