= Borki, Siedlce County =

Borki
- Village
- Location within Poland
- Coordinates: 52°1′39″N 21°52′49″E
- Country: Poland
- Voivodeship: Masovian
- County: Siedlce
- Gmina: Wodynie
- Population: 150

Borki [ˈbɔrki] is a village in the administrative district of Gmina Wodynie, within Siedlce County, Masovian Voivodeship, in east-central Poland.
