= Gmina Wodynie =

Gmina Wodynie Wodynie Commune
- Gmina
- Coat of arms
- Interactive map of Gmina Wodynie
- Coordinates (Wodynie): 52°3′N 21°58′E
- Country: Poland
- Voivodeship: Masovian
- County: Siedlce County
- Seat: Wodynie

Area
  - Total: 115.40 km^{2} (44.56 sq mi)

Population (2023)
  - Total: 4,129
  - Density: 35.78/km^{2} (92.67/sq mi)

Gmina Wodynie is a rural gmina (administrative district) in Siedlce County, Masovian Voivodeship, in east-central Poland. Its seat is the village of Wodynie, which lies approximately 25 kilometres (16 mi) south-west of Siedlce and 69 km (43 mi) east of Warsaw.

The gmina covers an area of 115.40 square kilometres (44.6 sq mi), and as of 2023 its total population is 4,129.

== Villages ==
Gmina Wodynie contains the villages and settlements of Borki, Brodki, Budy, Czajków, Helenów, Jedlina, Kaczory, Kamieniec, Kochany, Kołodziąż, Łomnica, Młynki, Oleśnica, Ruda Wolińska, Rudnik Duży, Rudnik Mały, Seroczyn, Soćki, Szostek, Toki, Wodynie, Wola Serocka, Wola Wodyńska and Żebraczka.

== Neighbouring gminas ==
Gmina Wodynie is bordered by the gminas of Borowie, Domanice, Latowicz, Mrozy, Skórzec and Stoczek Łukowski.
