= Szostek =

- Village
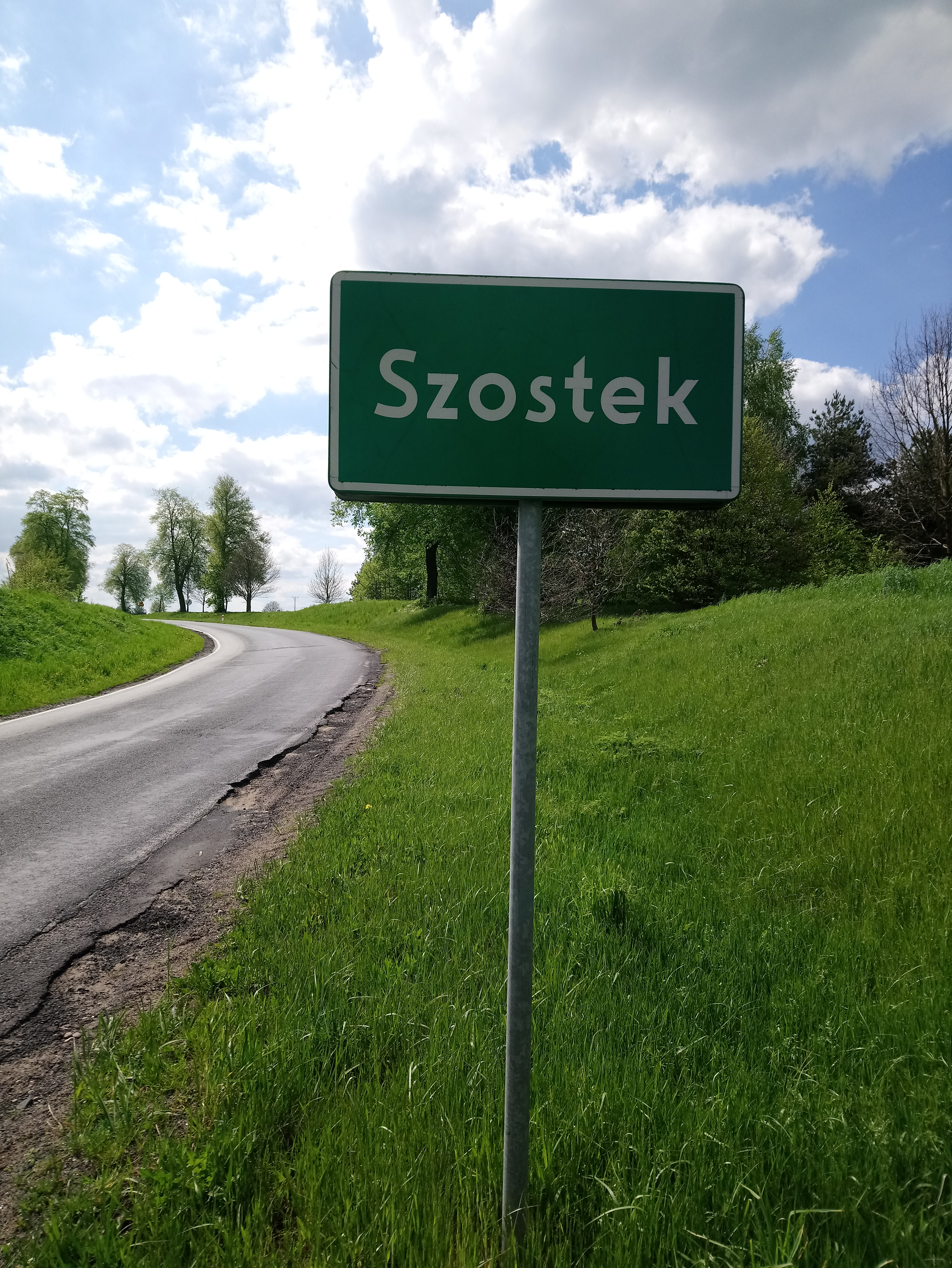

- Location within Poland
- Coordinates: 52°4′16″N 22°2′26″E
- Country: Poland
- Voivodeship: Masovian
- County: Siedlce
- Gmina: Wodynie

Szostek [ˈʂɔstɛk] is a village in the administrative district of Gmina Wodynie, within Siedlce County, Masovian Voivodeship, in east-central Poland.
