= Wodynie =

- Village
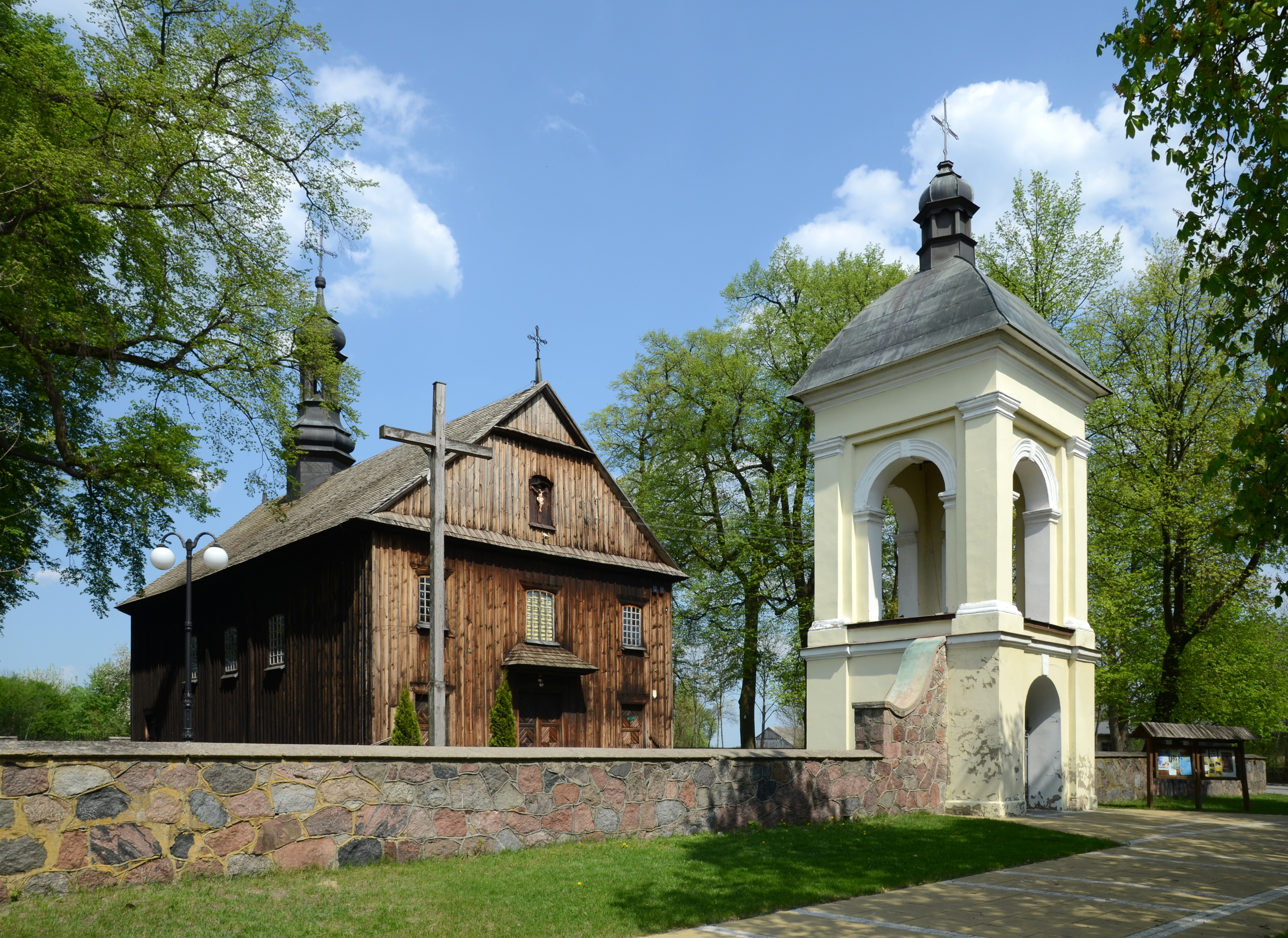
- Saints Peter and Paul church in Wodynie

- Location within Poland
- Coordinates: 52°3′N 21°58′E
- Country: Poland
- Voivodeship: Masovian
- County: Siedlce
- Gmina: Wodynie

Population
  - Total: 568
- Time zone: UTC+1 (CET)
  - Summer (DST): UTC+2 (CEST)
- Vehicle registration: WSI

Wodynie [vɔˈdɨɲɛ] is a village in Siedlce County, Masovian Voivodeship, in east-central Poland. It is the seat of the gmina (administrative district) called Gmina Wodynie.

== History ==
The local Catholic parish was founded in 1445.

The local cemetery contains the gravestone of mineralogist Jan Filip Carosi (1744–1799).

== Religion ==
There is a catholic parish and church in Wodynie.
