= Budy, Siedlce County =

Budy
- Village
- Location within Poland
- Coordinates: 52°4′16″N 22°3′37″E
- Country: Poland
- Voivodeship: Masovian
- County: Siedlce
- Gmina: Wodynie

Budy [ˈbudɨ] is a village in the administrative district of Gmina Wodynie, within Siedlce County, Masovian Voivodeship, in east-central Poland.
