= Czajków, Masovian Voivodeship =

Czajków
- Village
- Location within Poland
- Coordinates: 52°5′1″N 22°1′35″E
- Country: Poland
- Voivodeship: Masovian
- County: Siedlce
- Gmina: Wodynie
- Population: 80

Czajków [ˈt͡ʂai̯kuf] is a village in the administrative district of Gmina Wodynie, within Siedlce County, Masovian Voivodeship, in east-central Poland.
