= Kochany =

- Village
- Location within Poland
- Coordinates: 51°58′50″N 21°53′46″E
- Country: Poland
- Voivodeship: Masovian
- County: Siedlce
- Gmina: Wodynie

Kochany [kɔˈxanɨ] is a village in the administrative district of Gmina Wodynie, within Siedlce County, Masovian Voivodeship, in east-central Poland.
