= Toki, Masovian Voivodeship =

Toki
- Village
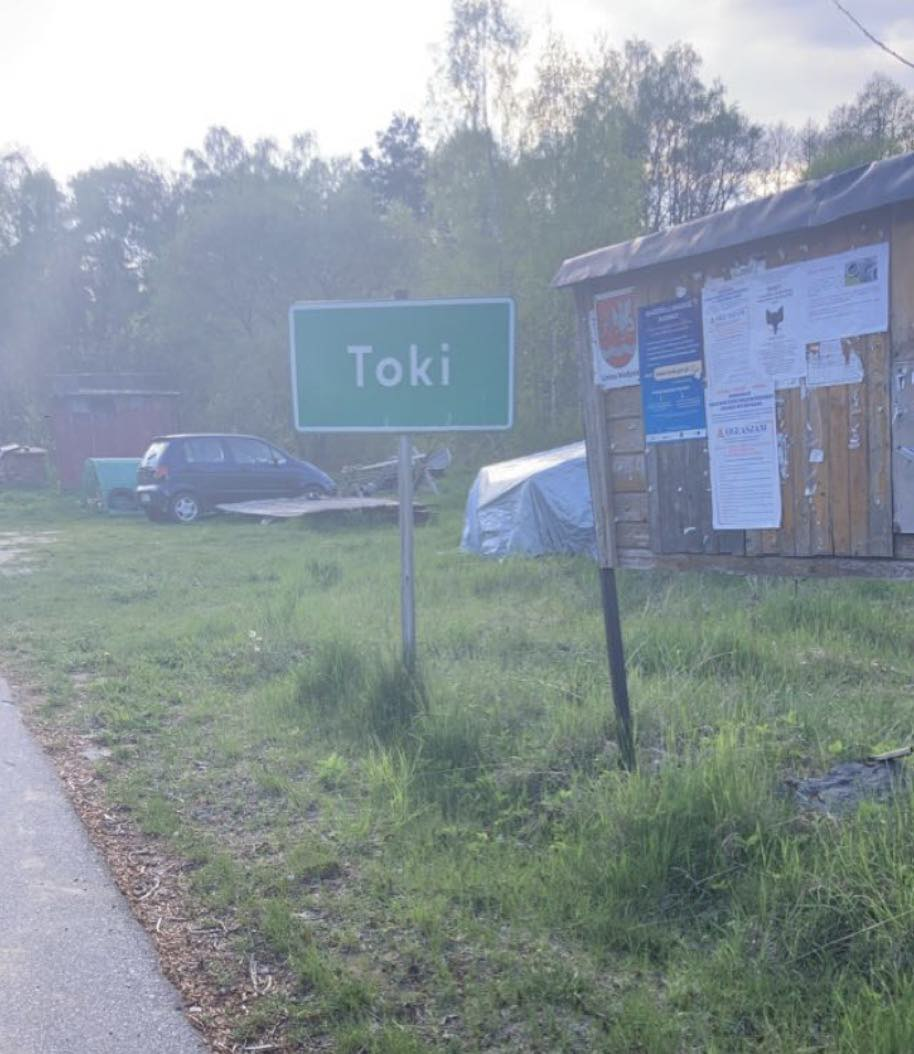

- Location within Poland
- Coordinates: 52°4′N 22°0′E
- Country: Poland
- Voivodeship: Masovian
- County: Siedlce
- Gmina: Wodynie

Toki [ˈtɔki] is a village in the administrative district of Gmina Wodynie, within Siedlce County, Masovian Voivodeship, in east-central Poland.
