= Młynki, Masovian Voivodeship =

Młynki
- Village
- Location within Poland
- Coordinates: 52°2′36″N 22°2′38″E
- Country: Poland
- Voivodeship: Masovian
- County: Siedlce
- Gmina: Wodynie

Młynki [ˈmwɨŋki] is a village in the administrative district of Gmina Wodynie, within Siedlce County, Masovian Voivodeship, in east-central Poland.
