= Kołodziąż, Siedlce County =

Kołodziąż
- Village
- Location within Poland
- Coordinates: 52°0′5″N 21°57′32″E
- Country: Poland
- Voivodeship: Masovian
- County: Siedlce
- Gmina: Wodynie
- Population (approx.): 250

Kołodziąż [kɔˈwɔd͡ʑɔ̃ʂ] is a village in the administrative district of Gmina Wodynie, within Siedlce County, Masovian Voivodeship, in east-central Poland.
