= Seroczyn, Siedlce County =

Seroczyn
- Village
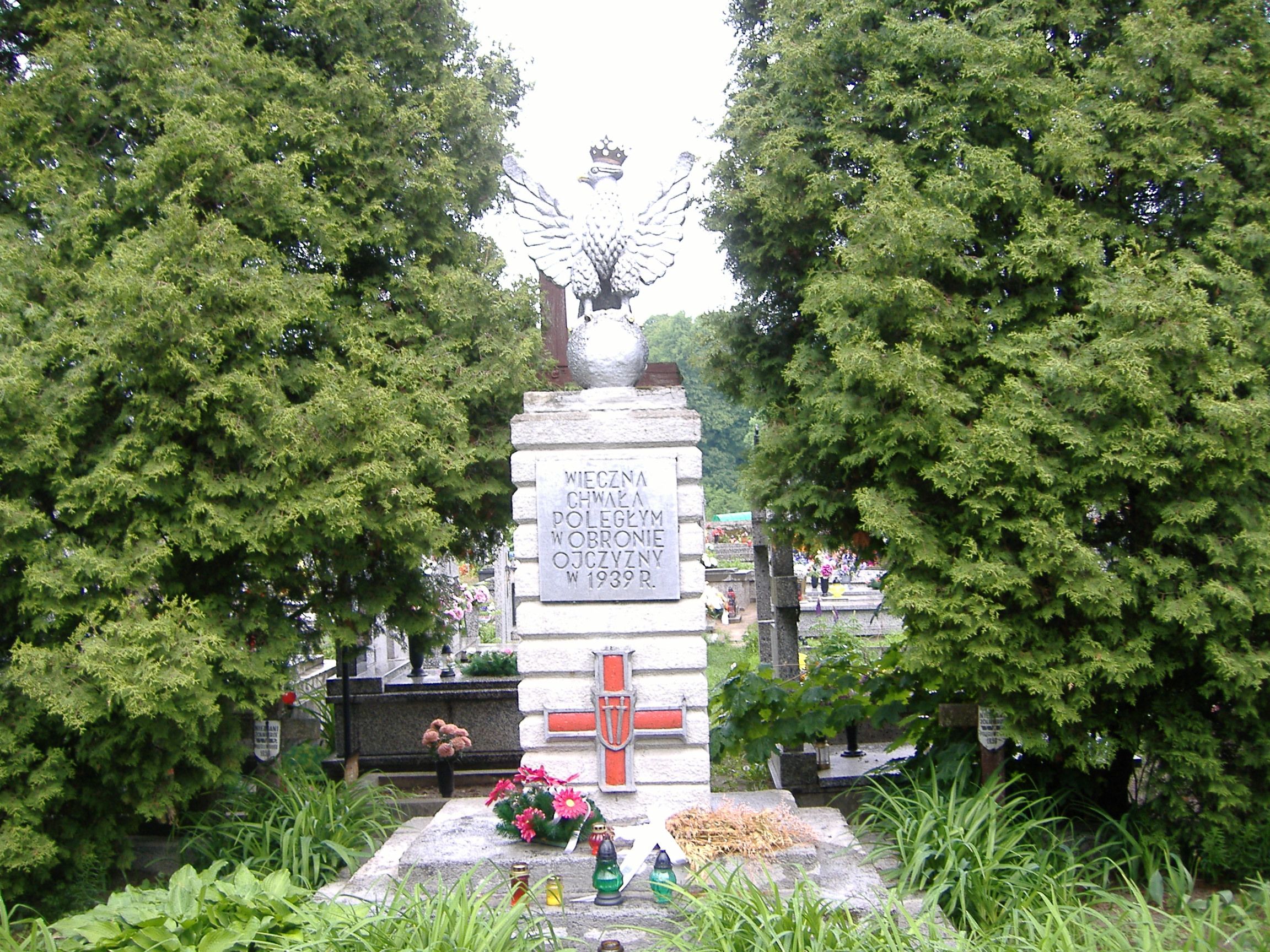
- World War II memorial

- Location within Poland
- Coordinates: 52°0′36″N 21°55′12″E
- Country: Poland
- Voivodeship: Masovian
- County: Siedlce
- Gmina: Wodynie

Population (approx.)
  - Total: 770
- Time zone: UTC+1 (CET)
  - Summer (DST): UTC+2 (CEST)
- Vehicle registration: WSI

Seroczyn [sɛˈrɔt͡ʂɨn] is a village in the administrative district of Siedlce County, Masovian Voivodeship, in east-central Poland.
