= Jedlina, Masovian Voivodeship =

Jedlina
- Village
- Location within Poland
- Coordinates: 52°3′12″N 21°54′59″E
- Country: Poland
- Voivodeship: Masovian
- County: Siedlce
- Gmina: Wodynie

Jedlina [jɛˈdlina] is a village in the administrative district of Gmina Wodynie, within Siedlce County, Masovian Voivodeship, in east-central Poland.
