= Kałuszyn =

Town in Masovian Voivodeship, Poland

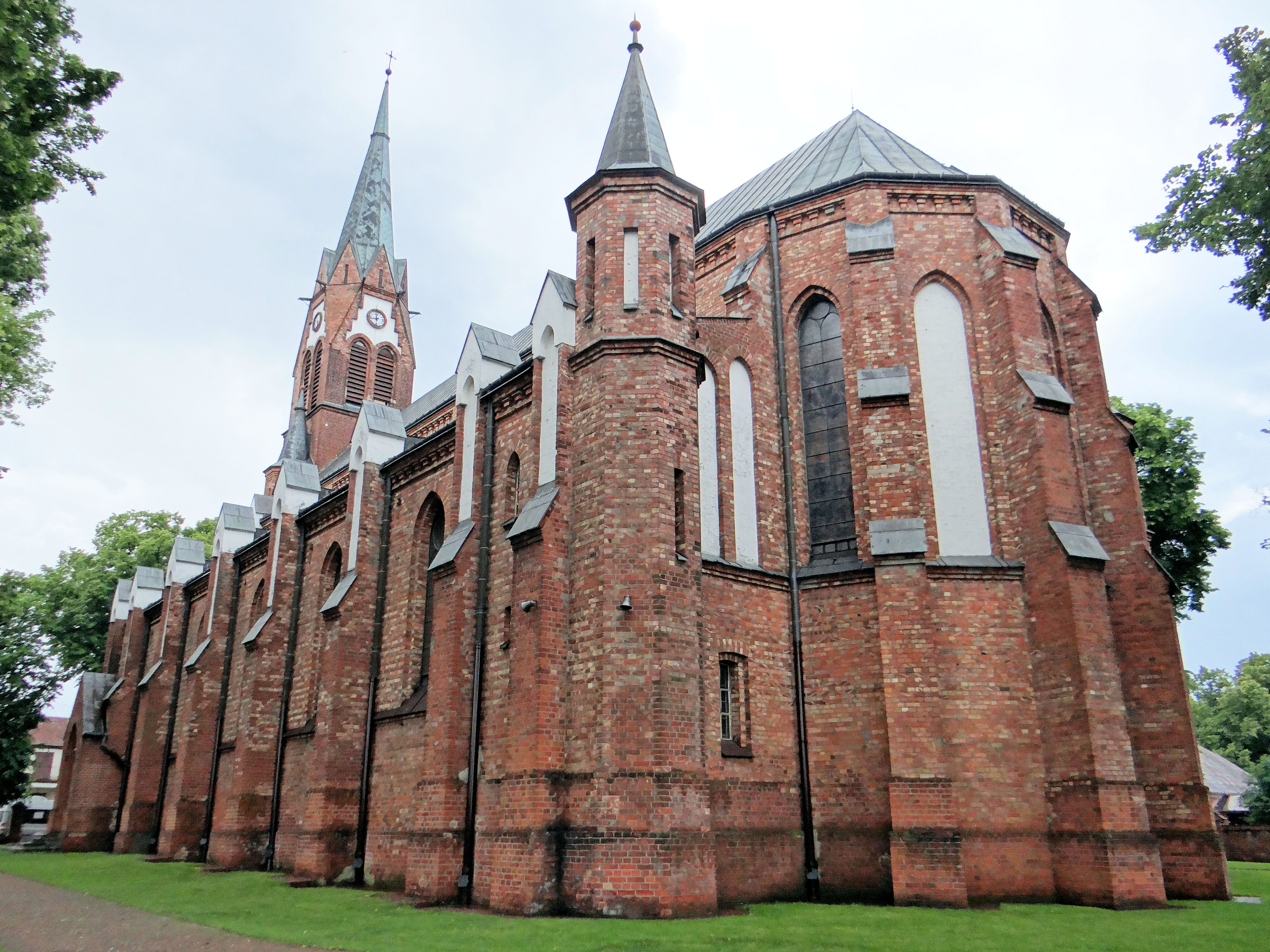
- Church of the Assumption of the Virgin Mary

- Coat of arms

- Location within Poland
- Coordinates: 52°12′30″N 21°48′42″E
- Country: Poland
- Voivodeship: Masovian
- County: Mińsk
- Gmina: Kałuszyn
- Town rights: 1718

Government
  - Mayor: Arkadiusz Czyżewski

Area
  - Total: 12.29 km^{2} (4.75 sq mi)

Population (2006)
  - Total: 2,905
  - Density: 236.4/km^{2} (612.2/sq mi)
- Time zone: UTC+1 (CET)
  - Summer (DST): UTC+2 (CEST)
- Postal code: 05-310
- Area code: +48 25
- Vehicle registration: WM
- Website: http://www.kaluszyn.pl

Kałuszyn [kaˈwuʂɨn] is a town in Poland, seat of the Gmina Kałuszyn (commune) in Mińsk County in Masovian Voivodeship.

== History ==
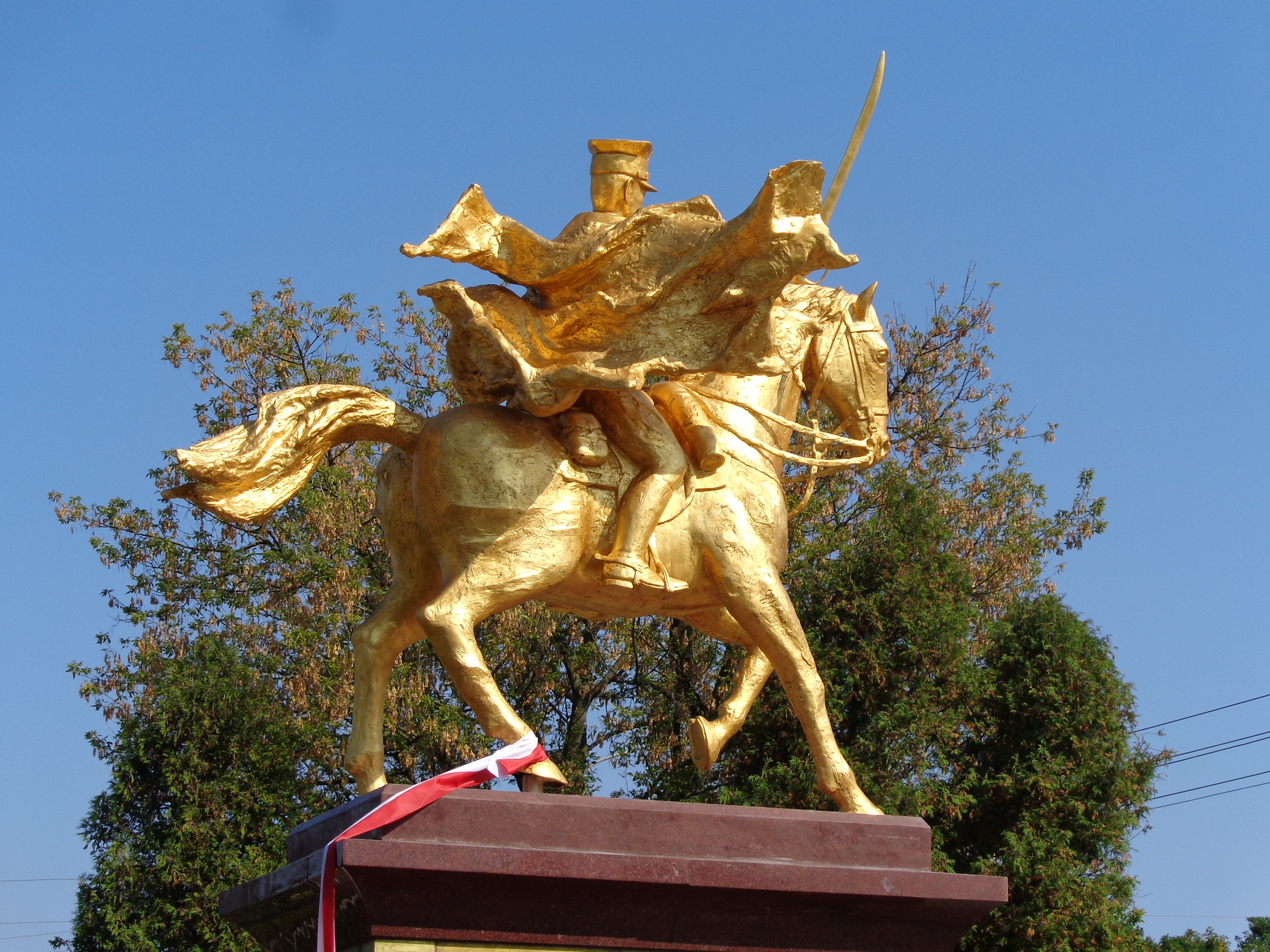
Golden Uhlan statue

In the Middle Ages, a filial church of the Catholic parish in Grębków was built. In 1472, it was upgraded to a parish church. In the 17th century, a Jewish community was established. In 1718, Kałuszyn was granted town rights by King Augustus II the Strong thanks to efforts of local nobleman Opacki. Kałuszyn was a private town, owned by several noble families, including the houses of Opacki, Rudziński, Rożniecki and Zamoyski. Administratively it was located in the Liw County in the Masovian Voivodeship in the Greater Poland Province.

The town was annexed by Austria in the Third Partition of Poland in 1795. Following the Austro–Polish War of 1809, it was regained by Poles and included within the short-lived Duchy of Warsaw. Following the duchy's dissolution in 1815, the town fell to the Russian Partition of Poland. Russian anti-Jewish repressions and laws resulted in an influx of Jews (see Pale of Settlement), and in the 19th century, the population was predominantly Jewish. In 1827, the town had a population of 1,826, incl. 1,455 Jews (80% of the total population). It was the site of three battles between Polish insurgents and Russian troops during the Polish November Uprising of 1830–1831. During the January Uprising, on 5 August 1863, a skirmish between Polish insurgents and Russian soldiers took place there. Russian soldiers surrounded a Polish insurgent unit, but after a short battle the Poles managed to break through the encirclement and escape towards Podlachia. Following World War I, in 1918, Poland regained independence and control of the town.

The Jewish community numbered 6,419 (76% of the total population) in 1897; 5,033 (82%) in 1921; 7,256 (82%) in 1931; and approximately 6,500 on the eve of the Holocaust. Economic branches included the manufacture of pottery, flour mills, prayer shawl weaving and the fur trade.

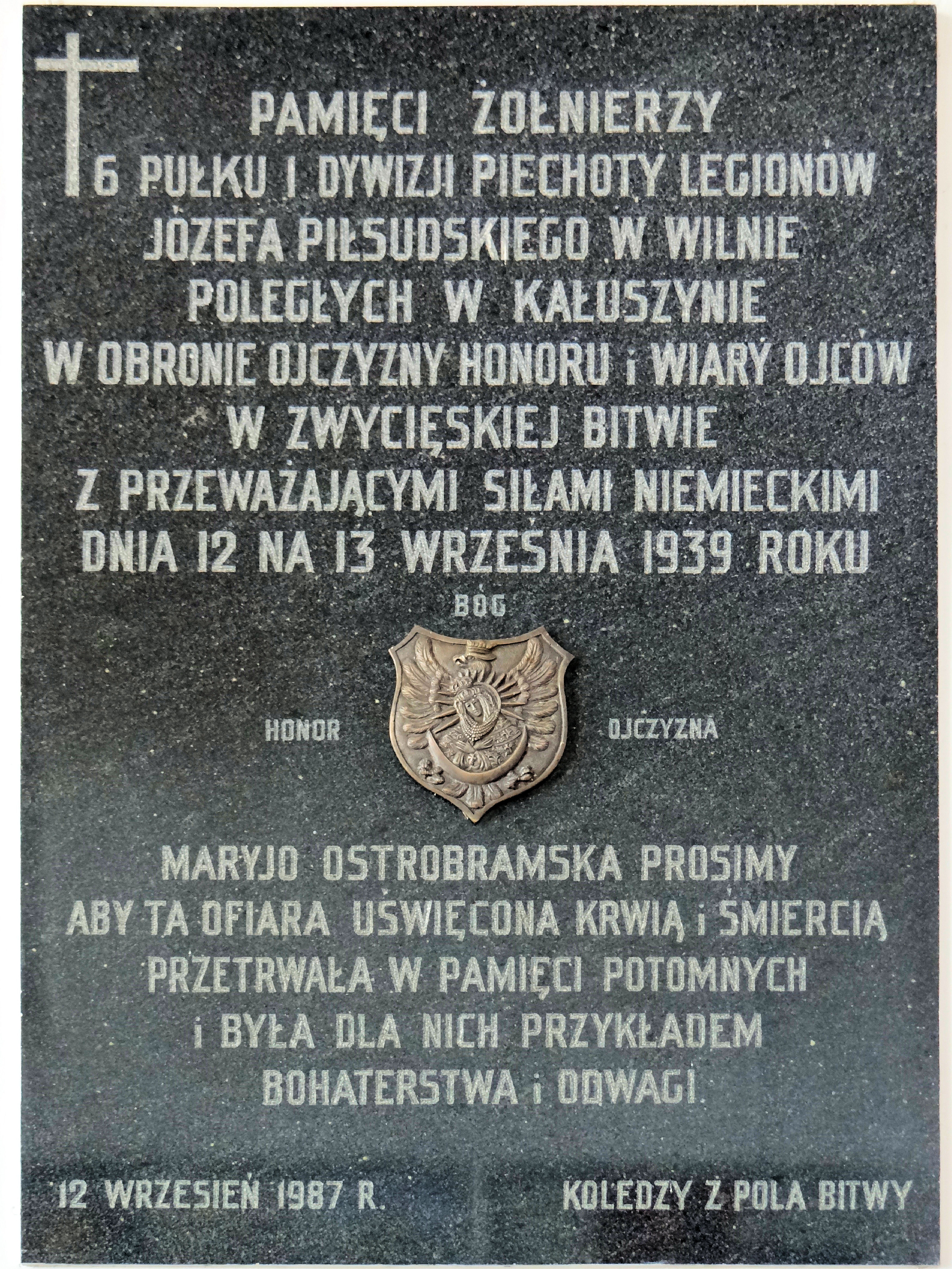
Memorial plaque to Polish soldiers fallen in the Battle of Kałuszyn in 1939

At the beginning of World War II, on 11–12 September 1939, it was the site of the Battle of Kałuszyn between Poles and invading German troops. Poles won the battle, however the town soon fell under German occupation. Under Nazi German occupation, Jews were terrorized, robbed, and often kidnapped for forced labour. In 1940, a ghetto was established in Kałuszyn, and Jewish property was confiscated. Hundreds of Jews from surrounding communities were brought to the Kaluszyn ghetto, most with no possessions, money, or employment. Dozens, or perhaps hundreds, of Jews died in the ghetto of starvation and disease. In late summer 1942, many young Jews fled to the forests after hearing of the murders of the Jews of Warsaw and Mińsk Mazowiecki. In September 1942, assisted by the Polish police, and possibly other auxiliaries, the Germans assembled the Jews at the market square. One Polish manager, Sheradzinsky (the Berman plant), managed to free 30 of his employees from the assembly. Hundreds were murdered there and at the Jewish cemetery. The remaining Jews were taken by train to Treblinka where they were immediately murdered. A few managed to escape from the train.

In 1944, the German occupation ended and the town was restored to Poland, although with a Soviet-installed communist regime, which stayed in power until the Fall of Communism in the 1980s. The Polish anti-communist resistance was active in Kałuszyn. In 1945 the resistance raided a local communist police station, and on 30 January 1947, the resistance took control of the town.

== Transport ==
Kałuszyn lies close to the A2 motorway (E30). The motorway bypasses Kałuszyn to the south. Exits 37 and 38 of the A2 motorway serve the town National Road 92 goes right through the town.

The nearest railway station to the town is to the south in Mrozy. The Warsaw-Terespol railway passes through Mrozy.

== Sports ==
The local football club is Victoria Kałuszyn. It competes in the lower leagues.
