= Wyszków, Wyszków County =

Wyszków
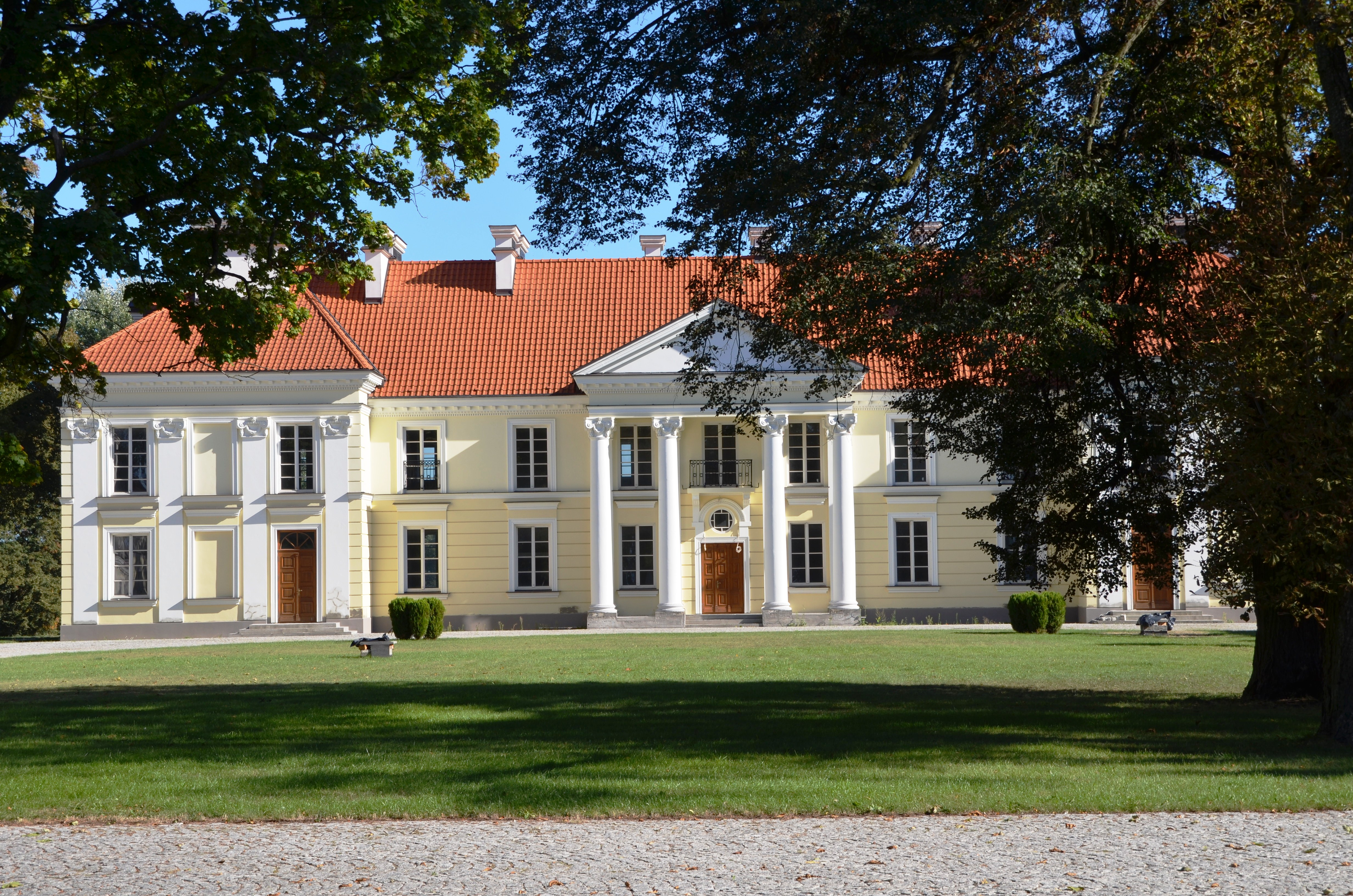
- Palace, built 1780

- Flag Coat of arms
- Interactive map of Wyszków
- Location within Poland
- Coordinates: 52°35′36″N 21°27′36″E
- Country: Poland
- Voivodeship: Masovian
- County: Wyszków
- Gmina: Wyszków
- First mentioned: 1203
- Town rights: 1502

Government
  - Mayor: Piotr Płochocki

Area
  - Total: 20.80 km^{2} (8.03 sq mi)

Population (2018)
  - Total: 26,500
  - Density: 1,270/km^{2} (3,300/sq mi)
- Time zone: UTC+1 (CET)
  - Summer (DST): UTC+2 (CEST)
- Postal code: 07-200, 07-202
- Area code: +48 029
- Car plates: WWY
- Website: www.wyszkow.pl

Wyszków ([ˈvɨʂkuf]) is a town in eastern Poland with 26,500 inhabitants as of 2018. It is the capital of Wyszków County in Masovian Voivodeship.

== History ==
The village of Wyszków was first documented in 1203. Wyszków was located on a trade route connecting Toruń with Brześć. It was granted town rights in 1502. It was administratively located in the Kamieniec County in the Masovian Voivodeship in the Greater Poland Province of the Kingdom of Poland. It was destroyed during the Swedish invasion of Poland (Second Northern War) in 1655–1660, and it lost its significance in the region.

It was annexed by Prussia in the Third Partition of Poland in 1795. In 1807 it was regained by Poles and included within the short-lived Polish Duchy of Warsaw, and in 1815 it passed to Russian-controlled Congress Poland. In 1870 it was deprived of its town rights, as one of many Polish town punished by the Russians for the unsuccessful Polish January Uprising. Industry developed after 1897, when the Pilawa-Tłuszcz-Ostrołęka railway was built. In 1918 Poland regained independence and control of Wyszków, and in 1919 town rights were restored.

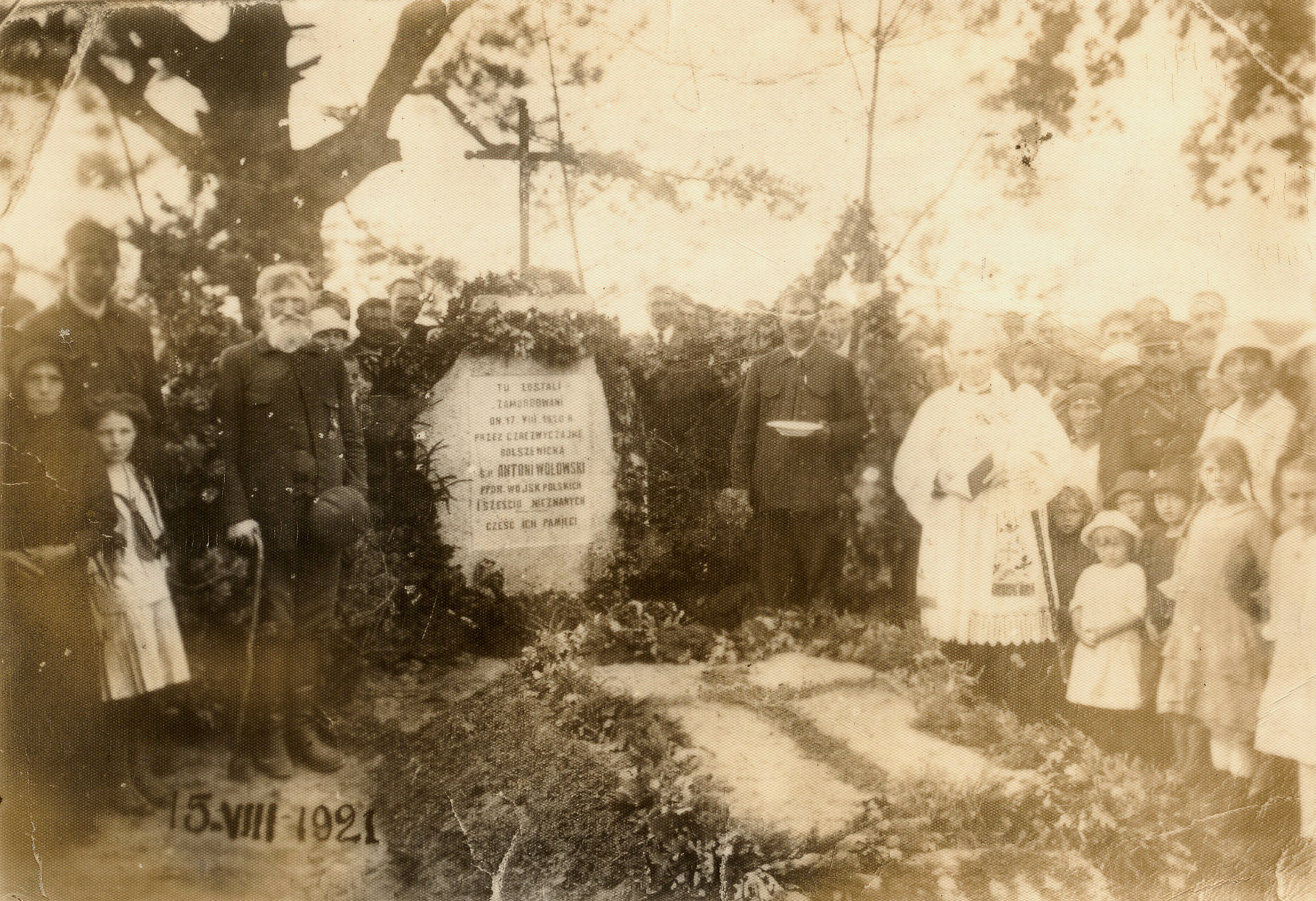
Unveiling of the monument to Poles murdered by the Russians on August 17, 1920 (1921)

During the Polish–Soviet War, on August 17, 1920, the Russian Cheka murdered seven Poles in the present-day district of Rybienko Leśne. Poles led by Mikołaj Bołtuć defeated the invading Russians in the Battle of Wyszków on August 18, 1920.

Fierce fights between the Poles and the invading Germans took place in the area on September 8–10, 1939 at the beginning of World War II. On September 9, 1939, the Germans committed a massacre of 65 Jews in Wyszków, and a massacre of a dozen or so Poles from Wyszków near the village of Pniewo (see Nazi crimes against the Polish nation). The town was then occupied by Germany, which made it part of the Warsaw District of the General Government. Before the war 45% of Wyszków's population of 12,000 were Jewish; after the war there were none. The Germans killed over 7,000 inhabitants of Wyszków, including 5,000 Jews, and operated a forced labour camp for Soviet prisoners of war. Nevertheless, the Polish resistance movement was active in the area. After the occupation, the town was restored to Poland, although with a Soviet-installed communist regime, which remained in power until the Fall of Communism in the 1980s. The communists destroyed pre-war memorials dedicated to Poles killed during the Polish–Soviet War in 1920.

In post-war Poland, the town was administratively part of the Warsaw Voivodeship until 1975, and the Ostrołęka Voivodeship from 1975 to 1998. In 1961, Rybienko Leśne was included within Wyszków's town limits as a new district.

On 14 September 1997 a memorial to Holocaust victims was unveiled in Wyszków. It is made of reclaimed Jewish gravestones that had been removed from the site in 1939 by German forces, who used them as paving stones and to build the local Gestapo headquarters. Scores of these desecrated tombstones were recovered and incorporated as part of the monument.

A monument of Polish mathematician and cryptologist Jerzy Różycki was unveiled in 2018.

== Sports ==
The most notable local sport clubs are football team Bug Wyszków and volleyball team KS Camper Wyszków. Both compete in the lower leagues.

== Wyszków in culture ==
Wyszków is the setting of the song Wyszków Tonie (lit. Wyszków is Sinking) by Polish rock band Elektryczne Gitary, released in the 1993 album A Ty Co. It uses sinking as an extended metaphor for succumbing to alcoholism.

== Notable people ==
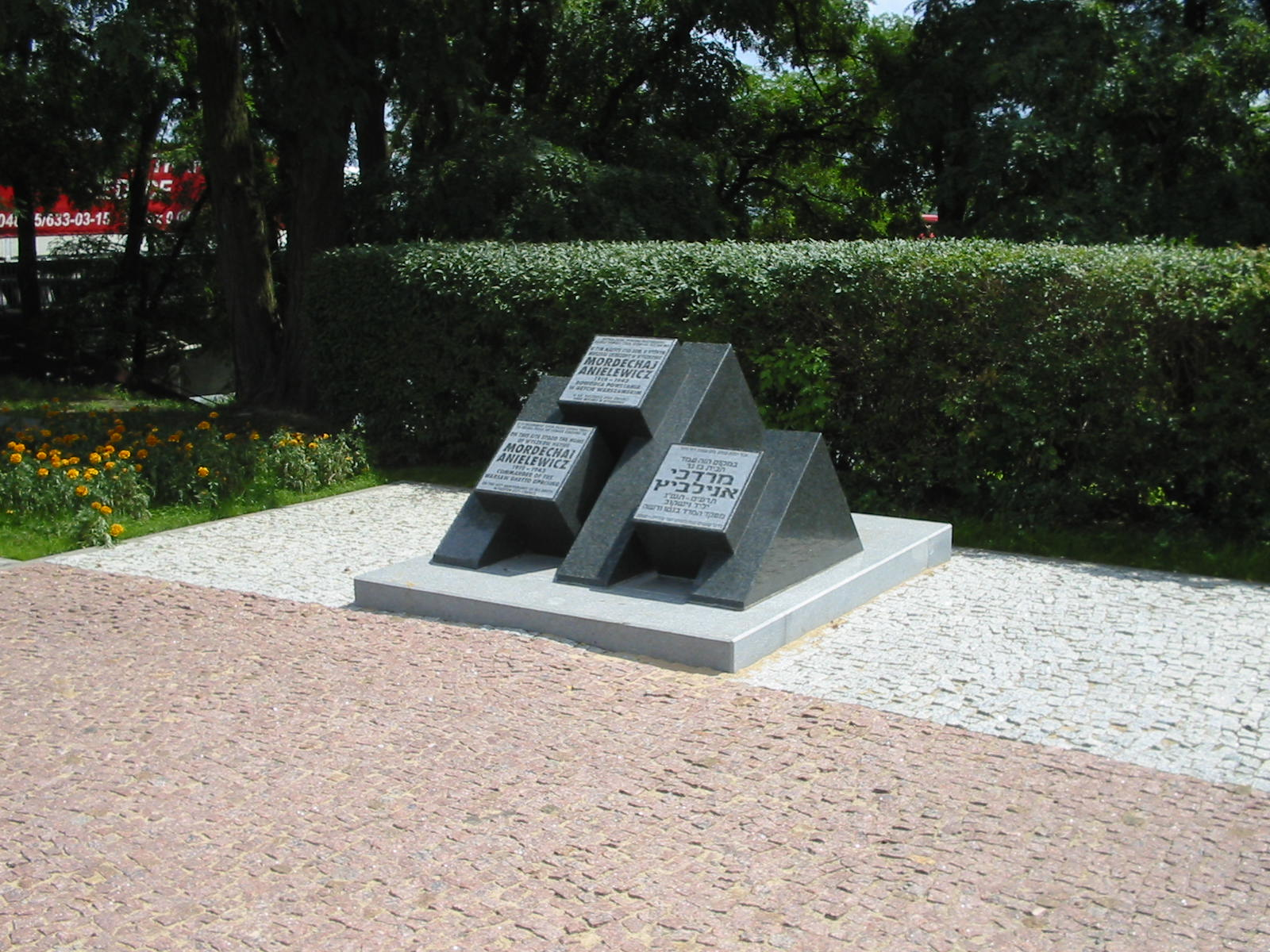
Monument to Mordechaj Anielewicz

- Mordechai Anielewicz (1919–1943), leader of the Warsaw Ghetto Uprising
- Jarosław Kalinowski (born 1962), Polish politician
- Berek Lajcher (1893–1943), Polish physician and activist
- Lanberry (born 1987), Polish singer and songwriter
- Jerzy Różycki (1909–1942), Polish mathematician and cryptologist who worked at breaking German Enigma machine ciphers before and during World War II; spent part of his childhood and graduated from high school in Wyszków.

== International relations ==
=== Twin towns — sister cities ===
Wyszków is twinned with:

- Kohtla-Järve, Estonia
