= Osiedle Antoniuk, Białystok =

Coordinates: 53°08′37″N 23°08′19″E

Antoniuk
- District (osiedle) of Białystok
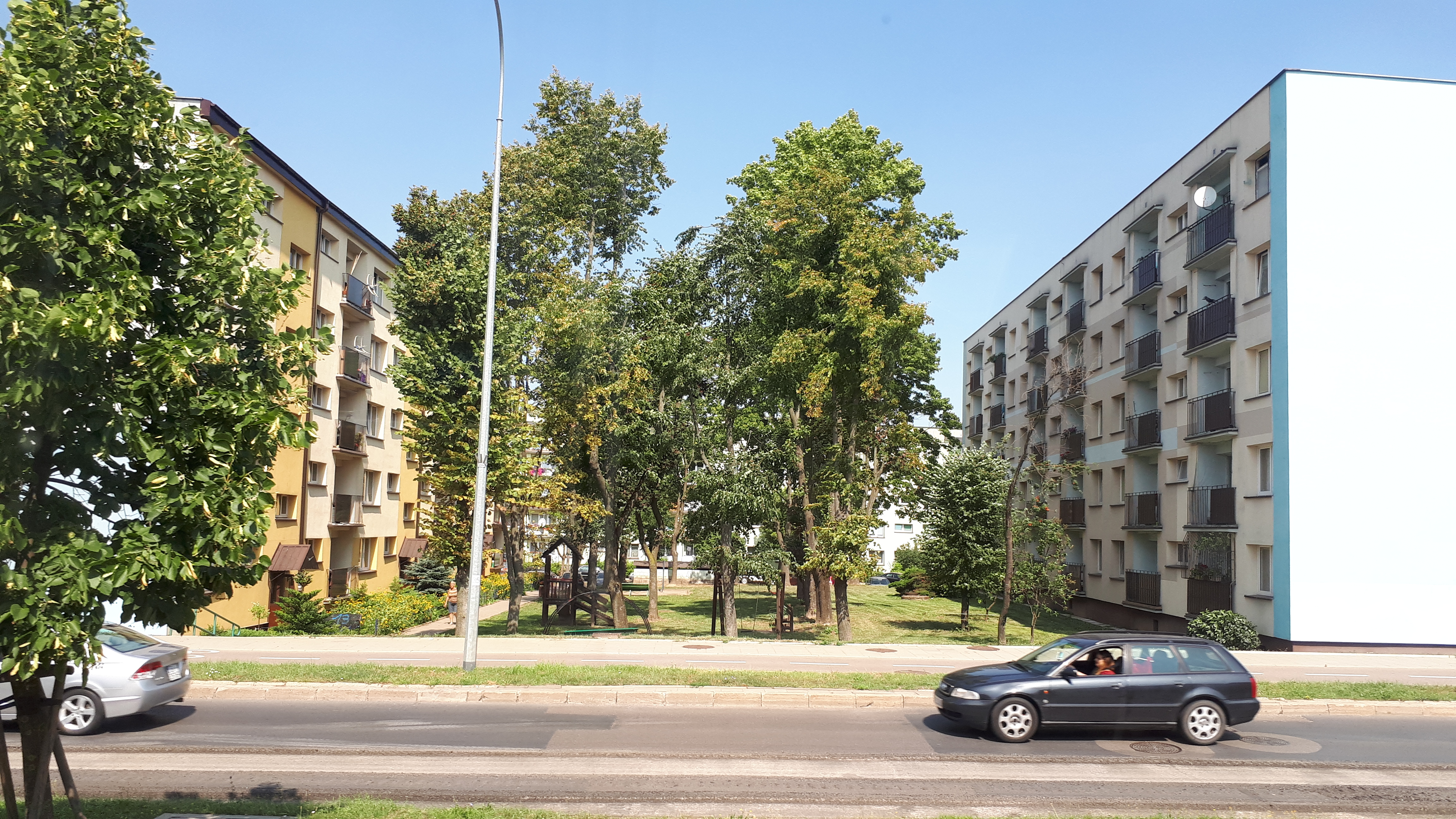
- Broniewskiego Street in Antoniuk, August 2018

- Location of Antoniuk within Białystok
- Country: Poland
- Voivodeship: Podlaskie
- City: Białystok
- Incorporated: 10 May 1919

Area
  - Total: 2.259 km^{2} (0.872 sq mi)
- Time zone: UTC+1 (CET)
  - Summer (DST): UTC+2 (CEST)
- Area code: +48 85
- Vehicle registration: BI

Antoniuk is one of the districts of the Polish city of Białystok, located in the central part of the city.

== History ==
Antoniuk is named after a man called Antoniuk from the nearby former village of Wysokie. The district is built on what was one of the two mill settlements in today's Białystok, located on the Biała River. The dam damming the pond (which no longer exists) was located near the bridge through which today runs Antoniukowska Street. Mention of a pond Antoniukowski contains Teka Glinki. At the bottom of a drained pond there was a stadium and a training ground for the "Włókniarz" sports club. Later, an apartment building was built here.

Antoniuk settlement was located parallel to the fields of the village of Białostoczek, from the border with Pietrasze to Antoniukowska Street. The shape of the settlement was similar to a rectangle and bordered on from the east with the village of Białostoczek, from the north with Dziesięciny, from the west with today's street Dębowa and to the south from Antoniukowska Street. The Antoniuk mill settlement boundaries also included the area of today's Technical School of Water Melioration, where originally a mill with associated buildings owned by Antoniuk was located. The Wysokostockie hill was connected with the high elevation of the area, called Łysa Góra. In the years 1960 - 1965 construction of housing estates in the areas newly connected to the city began.

== Sights ==
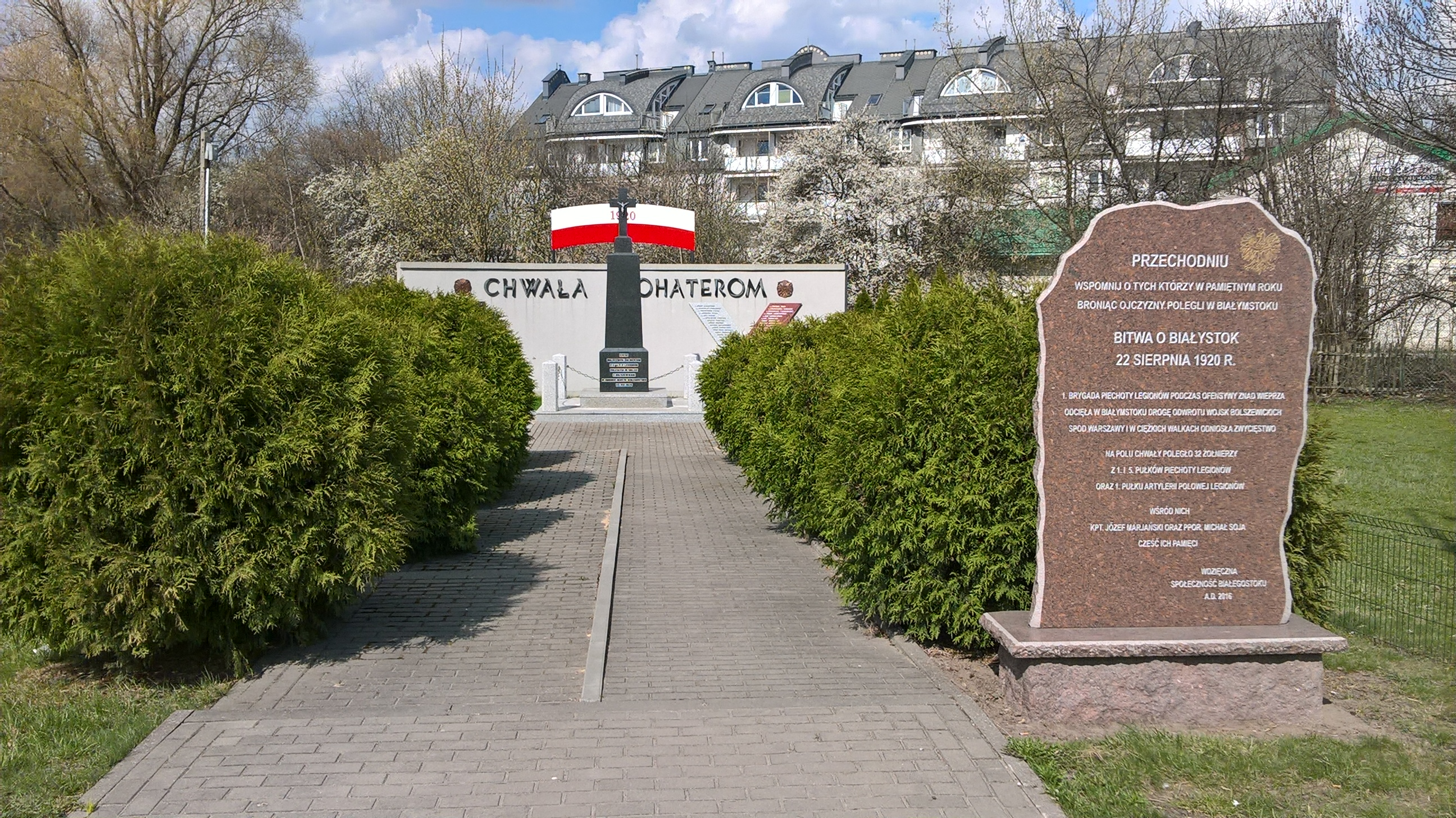
Monument to soldiers of the 1st Legions Infantry Regiment

A monument to soldiers of the 1st Legions Infantry Regiment of the Polish Army who died in the Battle of Białystok (1920) during the Polish–Soviet War is located in the district.
