= Władysław Broniewski =

Polish poet, writer, translator and soldier

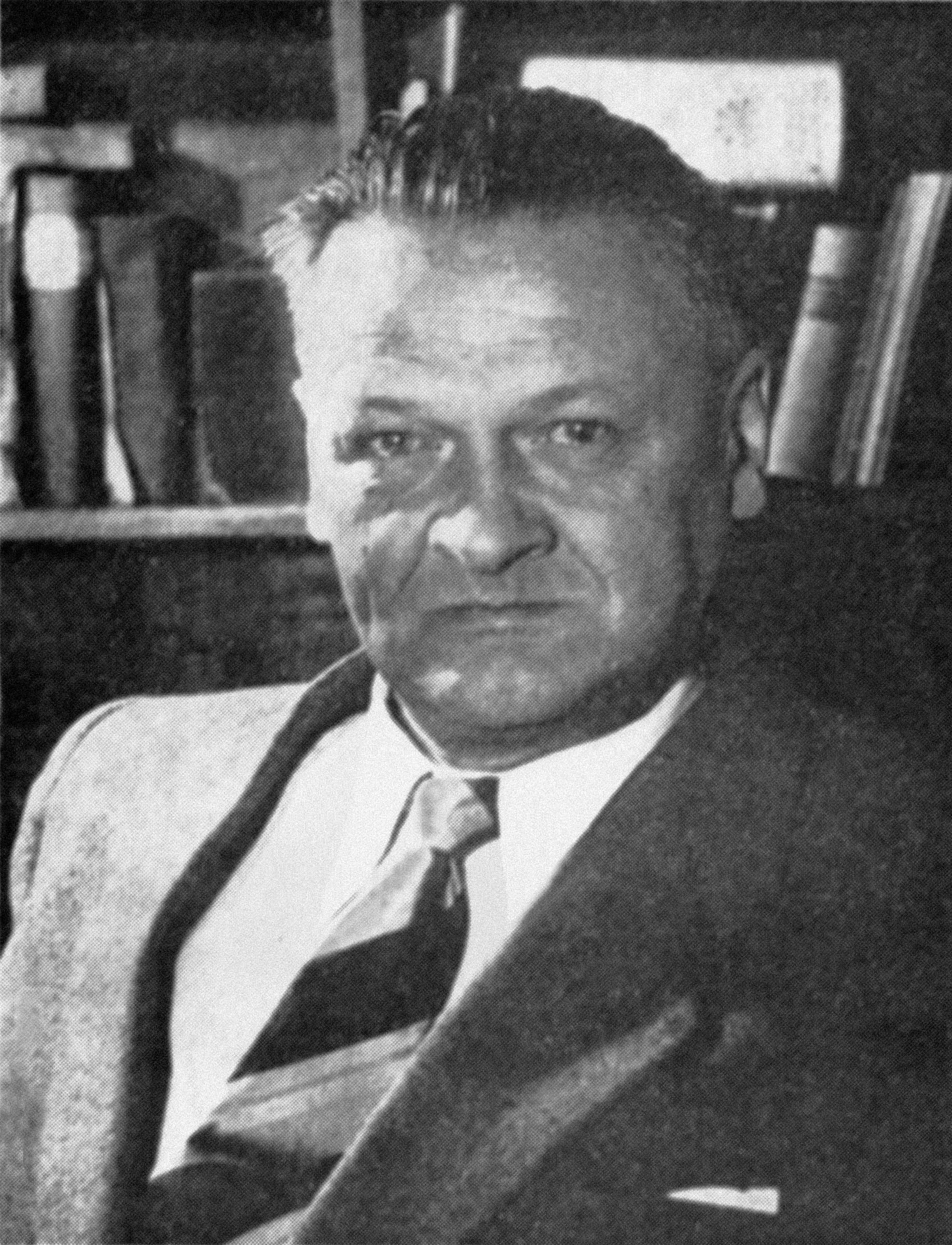
- Born: 17 December 1897; Płock, Congress Poland, Russian Empire
- Died: 10 February 1962 (aged 64); Warsaw, Polish People's Republic
- Citizenship: Poland
- Occupations: Writer, Poet

Władysław Kazimierz Broniewski (17 December 1897 – 10 February 1962) was a Polish poet, writer, translator and soldier, known for his revolutionary and patriotic writings.

== Life ==
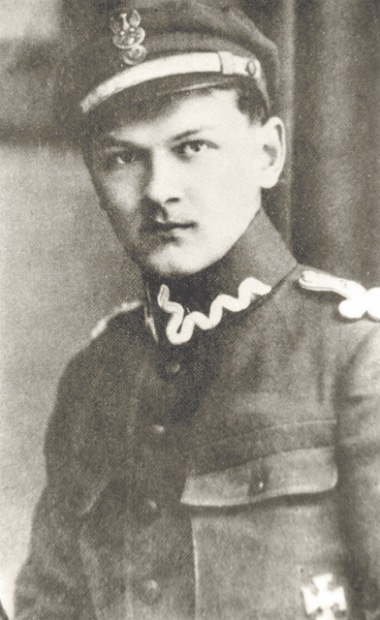
Broniewski as a soldier of Polish Legions in World War I

He was the son of Antoni, a bank clerk. As a young man, Broniewski joined in 1915 the legions of Józef Piłsudski. As a member of the 1st Legions Infantry Regiment, he participated in the Polish–Soviet War and in 1920 fought in the Battle of Białystok. He was decorated for bravery with the order of Virtuti Militari.

Broniewski developed leftist sympathies and by the late 1920s he was a revolutionary poet. In summer 1931, he was arrested during a literary meeting of writers connected with the Communist Party of Poland (KPP) along with Jan Hempel and Aleksander Wat. He was helped by Bolesław Wieniawa-Długoszowski.

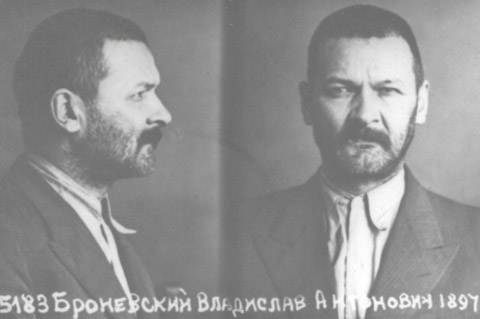
Broniewski after arrest by the NKVD in 1940

When Poland was attacked in 1939 by Germany, he wrote an important poem encouraging Poles to put away political differences and fight the aggressors. After Poland was invaded by the Soviet Union, Broniewski found himself in Soviet-occupied Lwów. His poems were printed in a Soviet-published newspaper, but he was soon arrested by the NKVD on trumped-up charges of "hooliganism". He refused to co-operate with the NKVD and after four months was transported to the Lubianka prison in Moscow, where he stayed for thirteen months. Afterwards, he worked at the Polish embassy in Kuybyshev. He left the Soviet Union with the Polish army led by General Władysław Anders and through Iran came to Iraq and then Palestine.

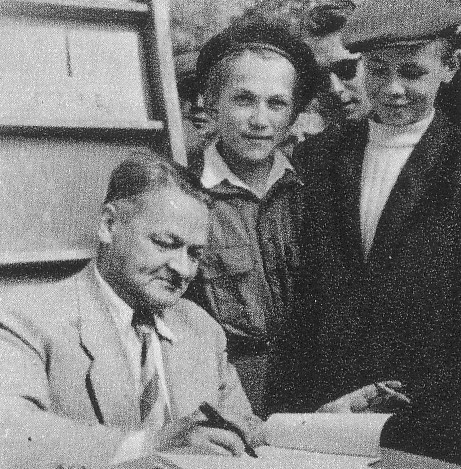
Władysław Broniewski signing autographs, c. 1960s

After World War II and the establishment of the Polish People's Republic, he compromised by writing in 1951 a poem Słowo o Stalinie ('A Word about Stalin'). Subsequently, Broniewski became an important political figure and was proclaimed a foremost national poet by the authorities. He still managed to preserve a certain degree of independence, and some of his poems from this period are a testimony to his talent. He had also been an accomplished translator of poetry and prose, translating, among others, Fyodor Dostoevsky, Sergei Yesenin, Vladimir Mayakovsky, and Bertolt Brecht.

During the last years of Broniewski's life, his health had been ruined by alcohol abuse. He died in Warsaw.

== Poetry ==
Broniewski's poetry deals with problems of human life in the context of historical events, such as wars and revolutions (for example, the Paris Commune), and with questions of justice, fight for freedom, patriotism and personal suffering. This last aspect is evident in the cycle Anka, dedicated to the memory of the tragically deceased poet's daughter Anka Broniewska, who was gas-poisoned on 1 September 1954 (often compared to Jan Kochanowski's Laments). Another important Broniewski poem is Ballady i romanse, alluding to the title of Adam Mickiewicz's collection. Ballady i romanse is about the Holocaust. Its hero is a thirteen year old Jewish girl Ryfka, who dies together with Jesus Christ shot by the Nazis. Broniewski was conservative regarding poetic form. He used classical forms of verse, traditional metres and stanzas. He often employed the dactylic metre.

== Poetry collections ==
- Wiatraki (1925)
- Dymy nad miastem (1927)
- Troska i pieśń (1932)
- Krzyk ostateczny (1938)
- Bagnet na broń (1943)
- Drzewo rozpaczające (1945)
- Nadzieja (1951)
- Anka (1956)

== Honours and awards ==
=== National honours ===
- Silver Cross of the War Order of Virtuti Militari (1921)
- Gold Cross of Merit (1946)
- Order of the Banner of Labour, 1st Class (1949)
- Commander's Cross with Star of the Order of Polonia Restituta (1950)
- Order of the Builders of People's Poland (1955)
- Medal of the 10th Anniversary of People's Poland (1955)

=== Foreign honours ===
- (Czechoslovakia) Knight of the Order of the White Lion (1957)
