= Battle of Ostrołęka =

Battle of Ostrołęka may refer to:

- Battle of Ostrołęka (1807), between First French Empire force and Russian forces
- Battle of Ostrołęka (1831), during Poland's November Uprising
- Battle of Ostrołęka (1920), during the Polish-Soviet War
