= Battle of Krwawy Bór =

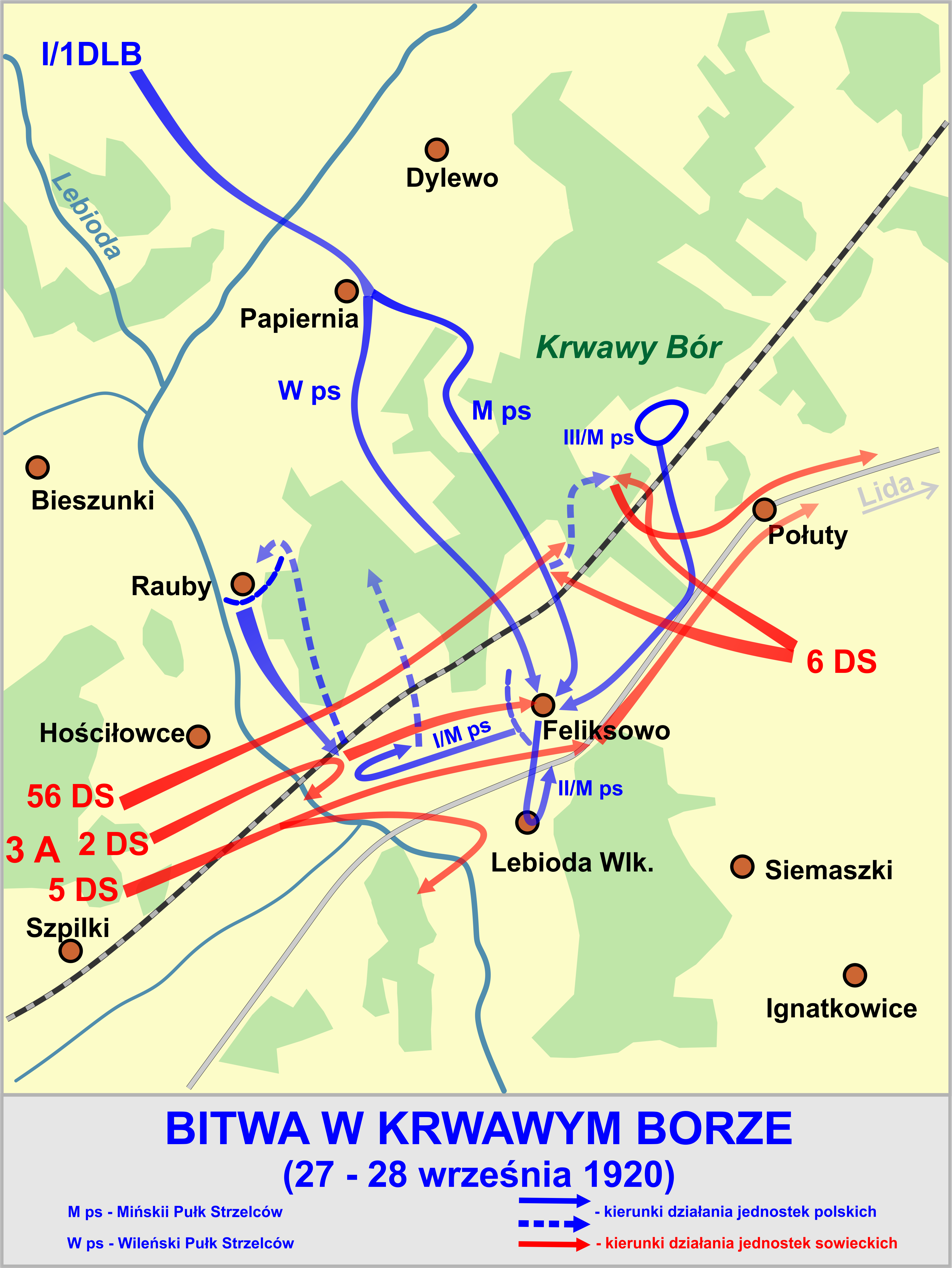
Date	September 27–28, 1920
Location	Near the villages of Papiernia and Feliksów
Result	Polish victory

Belligerents
Poland	Russian SFSR

Commanders and leaders
Jan Rządkowski	Vladimir Lazarevich

Strength
2,200 soldiers	unknown

Casualties and losses
130 killed, 230 wounded	several hundred killed and wounded, 1 thousand captured, 12 guns and 15 machine guns lost

The Battle of Krwawy Bor took place on 27–28 September 1920, during the Polish–Soviet War. The 1st Lithuanian–Belarusian Division, which was part of the Polish Army, clashed with the Soviet Third Army. The battle took place in a forest near the town of Lida (current Belarus). It also is known as the Battle of Lebioda (after the local river) and the Battle of Papiernia (after the nearby village).

During the Battle of the Niemen River, 1st Lithuanian–Belarusian Division (General Jan Rzadkowski) was part of the so-called Northern Assault Group of the Second Army. Together with 1st Legions Infantry Division, and 2nd and 4th Cavalry Brigade, it crossed the territory of Lithuania, in order to attack the back of Soviet Third Army. On 26 September 1920, under heavy Polish pressure, Soviet forces began to retreat towards Lida. On the next day in the morning, General Rzadkowski ordered Minsk and Wilno Rifle Regiments to block the Lebioda river crossings, in order to cut off all routes of retreat.

At the village of Wasiliszki, Minsk Regiment (1,100 soldiers) attacked Soviet 2nd Rifle Brigade. At 1 pm, Minsk Regiment, which was followed by Wilno Regiment (1,200 soldiers) and artillery, captured Papiernia, heading towards the river. At the same time, main forces of Soviet Third Army appeared in the same area. Polish 2nd Battalion captured Feliksow, forcing the headquarters of Third Army to flee. Before abandoning the village, Soviet General Lazarevich ordered 5th and 6th Rifle Divisions to attack Polish forces and recapture the river crossing. Due to the retreat, however, Soviet headquarters lost contact with the divisions.

Several Soviet regiments attacked the Poles from west, forcing them to retreat to Krwawy Bor. After heavy fighting, the Soviets managed to seize the road towards Lida and began their retreat. At 7 pm, Polish Wilno Regiment appeared at Krwawy Bor, to join the tired soldiers of Minsk Regiment. United Polish forces attacked the enemy, and recaptured the river crossing.

In the evening of 27 September General Rzadkowski found out about Polish capture of the city of Grodno, and concluded that main forces of Third Army were still fighting near Grodno. The Soviets, however, had left the city in the afternoon on 26 September, and at about 8 p.m., Soviet 56th Rifle Division approached the Lebioda river crossing, guarded by Polish regiments. One hour later, thousands of Soviet infantry attacked two Polish regiments, along a sector some 3 kilometers wide. Hand-to-hand combat ensued, with grenades and bayonets, in which Minsk and Wilno Regiments were overwhelmed by Soviet numerical superiority. Neither side captured prisoners, and the Soviets were determined to fight their way towards Lida. On 28 September 28, at about 1 a.m., Polish soldiers were pushed to Krwawy Bor, and the Soviets seized the road, along which their retreat continued.

Despite Polish defeat, the battle disorganized and slowed the retreat of Third Army. General Lazarevich with his officers fled to Lida, where he was attacked by 1st Legions Infantry Division, and as a result, was forced to escape further east.

Polish losses in the battle were 130 killed, 230 wounded and 410 missing. Several prisoners were shot by the Soviets in the forests near Lida. Exact Soviet losses are unknown, but they amounted to hundreds of killed and wounded, 1000 prisoners, 12 cannons and 15 heavy machine guns.

The Battle of Krwawy Bor is commemorated on the Tomb of the Unknown Soldier, Warsaw, with the inscription "KRWAWY BOR pod PAPIERNIA 27 – 28 IX 1920".

== Sources ==
- J. Odziemkowski, Leksykon wojny polsko-rosyjskiej 1919 – 1920, wyd. RYTM Warszawa 2004.
