= Joanna Broniewska-Kozicka =

Polish filmmaker (1929–1954)

- Anka Broniewska, 1954
- Born: 25 November 1929; Kalisz
- Died: 1 September 1954 (aged 24); Warsaw
- Burial place: Powązki Military Cemetery
- Education: University of Warsaw; University of Łódź
- Occupations: Producer, director, screenwriter
- Years active: 1952–1954
- Known for: Documentary films
- Spouse: Stefan Kozicki
- Children: 1
- Father: Władysław Broniewski

Joanna Broniewska-Kozicka (25 November 1929 – 1 September 1954) was a Polish documentary producer, director and screenwriter who died of natural gas poisoning. She became widely known after her death because of a well known collection of poems written by her father, Władysław Broniewski, titled Anka.

== Biography ==
Widely known as Anka Broniewska, she was the daughter of poet Władysław Broniewski and Janina Broniewski, who lived in Warsaw until the outbreak of World War II. Her parents' marriage broke up in 1938. When Soviet troops invaded Poland, she and her mother were moved to territories occupied by the Soviet Union. After the German troops of the Third Reich attacked the USSR from the west, the refugees were evacuated even farther east from their homeland, deep into the country to a state farm, later living in Kuybyshev and Moscow. Correspondence from this period survives between Anka and her father, who was imprisoned in the USSR for the crime of "Polish nationalism." After his release, he set off with Polish forces in Anders' Army to the Middle East, still striving to maintain his relationship with his daughter despite the distance that separated them.

After Anka's return to Poland, the 16-year-old Broniewska graduated from Maria Konopnicka High School No. 10 in Łódź and began studies at the University of Warsaw's Faculty of Humanities (art history and sociology) and at the Faculty of Journalism. During an internship at the weekly periodical Po Prostu, she met her future husband, journalist Stefan Kozicki. They married in December 1947, and she sometimes used the name Joanna Kozicka.

In the summer of 1948, Anka and Kozicki moved to Łódź, where she began working as an assistant director on the feature film Dom na pustkowiu (A House in the Wilderness) while simultaneously studying sociology at the University of Łódź. In the autumn of 1948, at 19, she gave birth to her daughter Ewa Zawistowska and continued working on the film and completing her third year of sociology. She soon interrupted her sociology and journalism studies. After receiving a state scholarship, in October 1949 she traveled to Paris, where she passed the exams for the second year of the Institute for Advanced Cinematographic Studies (IDHEC) Film Institute's Production Department.

After completing her film studies in France, she returned to Poland in January 1951 and defended her thesis at the Łódź Film School, presenting "The Paris Commune," for which she had previously gathered materials while living abroad. She became an independent director at the Documentary Film Studio in Warsaw. In the summer of that same year, she assisted documentary film director Joris Ivens in making a film about the World Festival of Youth and Students in Berlin. In 1952, she shot the film "Palace of Youth" at the WFD, which was followed in 1953 with another documentary, "The Brigade Begins the Assault," about the construction of the Jaworzno Power Plant.

In 1953, she began collecting documentation for her next film Vistula. Her father, Władysław Broniewski, co-wrote the script and provided a poetic commentary. They traveled the country together to film the production, but efforts stopped after Anka's tragic death from natural gas poisoning.

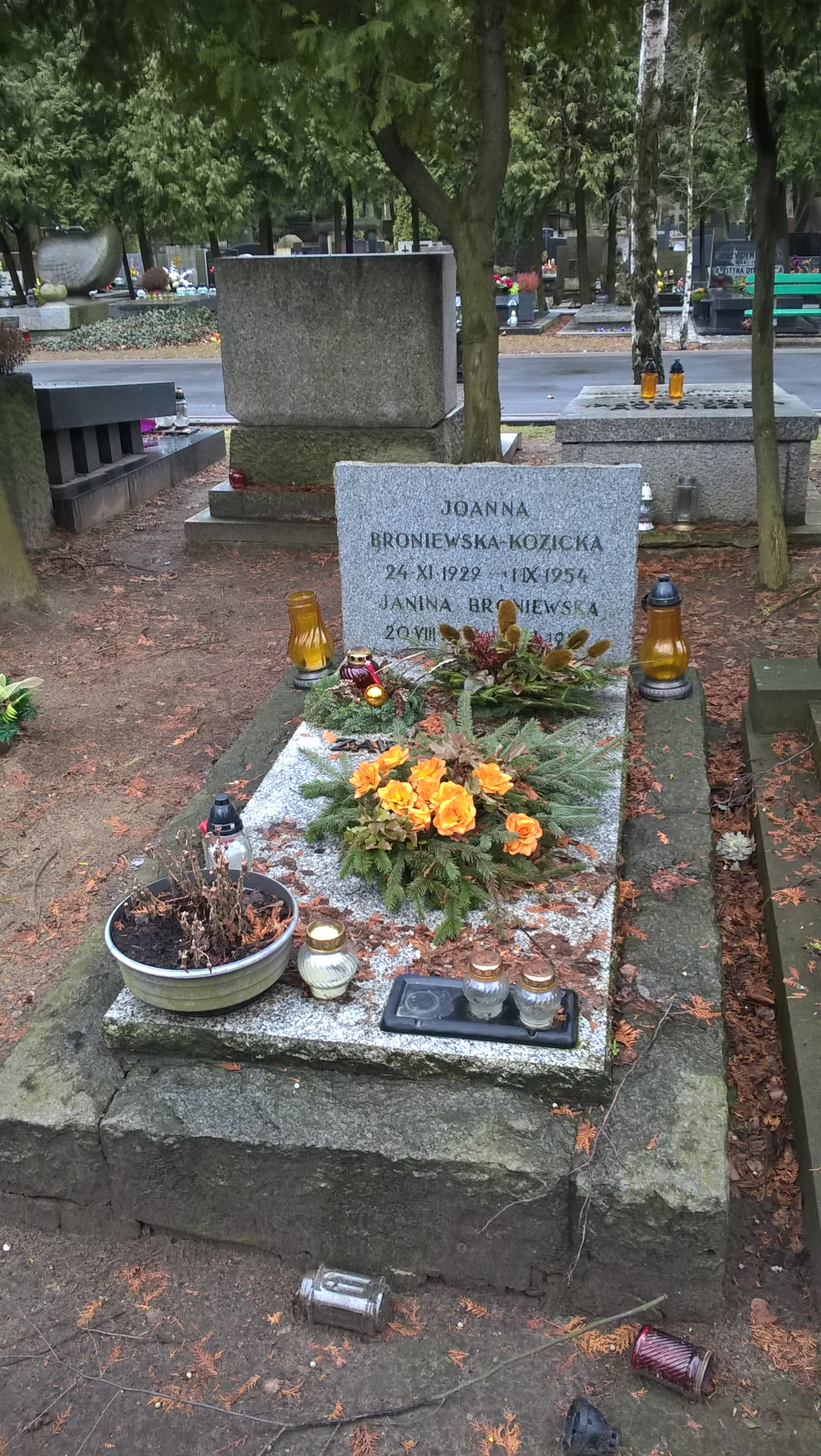
The grave of Joanna Broniewska-Kozicka and her mother (Janina) at the Powązki Military Cemetery (2016).

Joanna (Anka) Broniewska-Kozicka died on 1 September 1954 in her Warsaw apartment and was buried at the Powązki Military Cemetery (plot 2A-13-12). Speculation about her death remains, whether it was accidental or intentional.

== Legacy ==
After her death, Władysław Broniewski wrote a cycle of 17 poems in her memory entitled Anka, which literary critics have called contemporary Laments. In 1956, the collection was published in a booklet titled Anka.

According to Anka's daughter, Ewa Zawistowska, a "family archive consisting of two chests of documents, photographs and letters fell into her possession after the death of Janina Broniewska. Many documents, including letters from Anka and her husband, Stefan Kozicki, are published for the first time. The book was published by Prószyński i S-ka."

== Filmography ==
- 1949: A House in the Wilderness (assistant cinematography)
- 1951: Paris Commune (direction and screenplay)
- 1952: In the Palace of Youth (direction and screenplay)
- 1953: The Brigade begins its assault (production and screenplay
- 1954: Vistula (unfinished)
