= Battle of Borodzianka =

- Part of Polish–Soviet War
Date	11th – 13th June 1920
Location	Borodzianka, modern day Ukraine
Result	Polish victory

Belligerents
Poland	Russian SFSR

Commanders and leaders
Edward Śmigły-Rydz	Aleksandr Jegorow

Units involved
1st Legions Infantry Division	25th Rifle Division, Baszkirska Samodzielna Brygada Kawalerii, 7th Rifle Division

Casualties and losses
Around 260 killed and wounded	Unknown

The Battle of Borodzianka took place on 11–13 June 1920, during the Kiev offensive of the Polish Army in the Polish–Soviet War. Polish 1st Legions Infantry Division, commanded by Edward Śmigły-Rydz, clashed with Red Army's 25th Rifle Division, supported by Bashkir Cavalry Brigade. Soviet forces were commanded by Alexander Yegorov. The battle took place along the Zdwizh river, some 50 kilometers west of Kiev.

== Background ==
On 10 June 1920 the Polish Third Army, while evacuating from Kiev along the rail line to Korosten, met Soviet forces under Golikov. After a short skirmish, the Poles managed to fight open a route near Borodianka (Borodzianka). General Alexander Yegorov, who commanded Southwestern Front, decided to surround and destroy Polish forces near the Zdwizh river. To achieve this, he concentrated 25th Rifle Division and Bashkir Cavalry Brigade, and both units took their positions near Borodianka. Altogether, Soviet forces numbered 3500 soldiers.

Meanwhile, Edward Śmigły-Rydz and his soldiers marched along the rail track towards Korosten. Polish soldiers guarded some 30 trains with civilians, equipment and food, evacuated from Kiev. Polish column was some 30 kilometers long.

== The battle ==
On 11 June the first Polish battalions reached Borodianka. They were immediately engaged in a battle with the Red Army, which guarded river crossings. Poles tried to seize a rail bridge, but were repelled by Soviet machine gun fire.

After a short break, Colonel Stefan Dąb-Biernacki, who commanded 1st Legions Infantry Brigade, decided to carry out two simultaneous attacks on Nowa Grobla and the bridge. Furthermore, he sent Major Boleslaw Popowicz with three companies to attack the Soviets from the south. Soon afterwards, two Polish companies captured the bridge, and Soviet forces abandoned the rail station.

First stage of the battle ended in Polish victory, but the Soviets seized local hills, and the route of retreat was still closed. Genera Yegorov sent for reinforcements, and Colonel Dab-Biernacki, fully aware of the gravity of the situation, ordered an assault on 12 June, early in the morning. Polish soldiers spent a sleepless night, awaiting the signal for the assault. In the morning, after a hot meal, divided into two groups, they attacked the Soviets. The enemy, expecting Polish move, was ready and met the Poles with machine gun fire. Dab-Biernacki decided to send all his units into the bloody battle. Soviet soldiers of the 25th Rifle Division did not give up and stood their ground, and both sides in some cases used bayonets. Neither side took prisoners, and after one hour the Soviets began to retreat slowly.

In the afternoon, a group of Colonel Jozef Rybak arrived at the battlefield. By 6 pm, Polish engineers had repaired the rail bridge, and the column of evacuation trains, headed by Armoured Train Poniatowski, set off towards Poland. A gap in Soviet encirclement was opened, but the battle was not over. The enemy concentrated its forces in local villages, and attacked in the morning of the next day. After an artillery barrage, Soviet cavalry of 2nd Kuban – Don Regiment entered the battle, scattering Polish forces. Due to quick initiative of Dab-Biernacki, who ordered a counterattack, the Soviets were repelled and Poles were finally able to continue their retreat.

Polish losses amounted to 260 dead and wounded, while Soviet losses were so high that 217th Rifle Regiment virtually ceased to exist, as most of its soldiers and officers were killed.

The Battle of Borodzianka is commemorated on the Tomb of the Unknown Soldier, Warsaw, with the inscription "BORODZIANKA 11 – 13 VI 1920".

== Sources ==
- Janusz Odziemkowski, Leksykon wojny Polsko-rosyjskiej 1919–1920, Oficyna Wydawnicza RYTM Warszawa 2004
