= Battle of Arras (1915) =

Battle in 1915 during the First World War

- Part of the Second Battle of Artois on the Western Front of the First World War
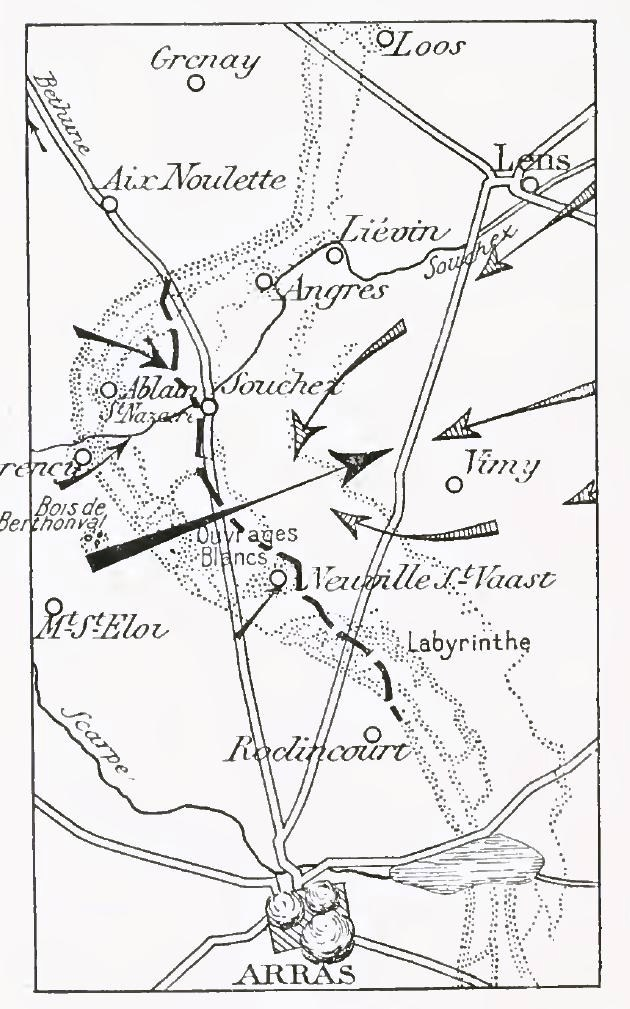
- French attack on Vimy Hill, May 1915
Date	May 9 1915
Location	Vimy Hill, Arras 50.379°N 2.774°E
Result	See Aftermath section

Belligerents
France	Germany

Commanders and leaders
Osmont d'Amilly †; Václav Dostal †; Lucjan Malcz †	Unknown

Units involved
Bayonne Legion Nazdar Company	Unknown

Strength
Nazdar company: 250	

Casualties and losses
Up to 75% of the combat status of dead or wounded Nazdar company: 42 killed 90 wounded	Unknown

The Battle of Arras was fought on 9 May 1915 on the Western Front in France. The so-called Bayonne Legion (a French Foreign Legion infantry unit which consisted of ethnic Polish volunteers) clashed with troops of the Imperial German Army, defending the hill of Vimy, located 10 kilometers north of Arras, France. The Czechoslovak battalion Nazdar also took part in the engagement, the first battle of what would become the Czechoslovak Legion, and was nearly wiped out in the process.

== Background ==
In August 1914, after the outbreak of the Great War, several ethnic Poles living in France volunteered to join the French Foreign Legion, hoping that a separate Polish unit would be created within that formation. On August 21, 1914, French authorities agreed to the request of the Committee of Polish Volunteers, and soon afterwards, two Polish units were formed. Some volunteers were sent to Bayonne, where a company of some 180 soldiers was formed and trained. This company came to be called the Bayonne Legion, and it became the 1st Foreign Regiment's 2nd Company, which was in the 1st Infantry Division. Its officers were French, while Poles served in lower ranks.

Other volunteers were sent to Rueil, where a second company was formed. On October 22, 1914, the Bayonne Legion was sent to the frontline in Champagne, where they took positions near Sillery, Marne, as part of the Moroccan Division. Until April 1915, the Poles kept their positions along the Aisne river.

== Battle ==
On May 9, the Legion attacked the hill of Vimy, located some ten kilometers from Arras. They succeeded in capturing German trenches, but with very heavy losses, i.e. 75% of the manpower. Only 50 soldiers survived the battle, with all officers, including the Legion's commander, major Osmonde, dying in the battle.

== Aftermath ==
Due to these losses, the unit's remnants were withdrawn to the rear. On June 16, several soldiers died in a clash with German forces near Souchez, and in the summer of 1915, the company was dissolved. Most of the survivors joined the Blue Army in 1917.

== Commemoration ==
The Battle of Arras is commemorated on the Tomb of the Unknown Soldier in Warsaw with the inscription "ARRAS 9 V 1915".

== Sources ==
- Mieczysław Wrzosek, Polski czyn zbrojny podczas pierwszej wojny światowej 1914–1918, Państwowe Wydawnictwo "Wiedza Powszechna", Warszawa 1990, ISBN 83-214-0724-2
