= Ławica, Poznań =

Ławica
- Neighbourhood
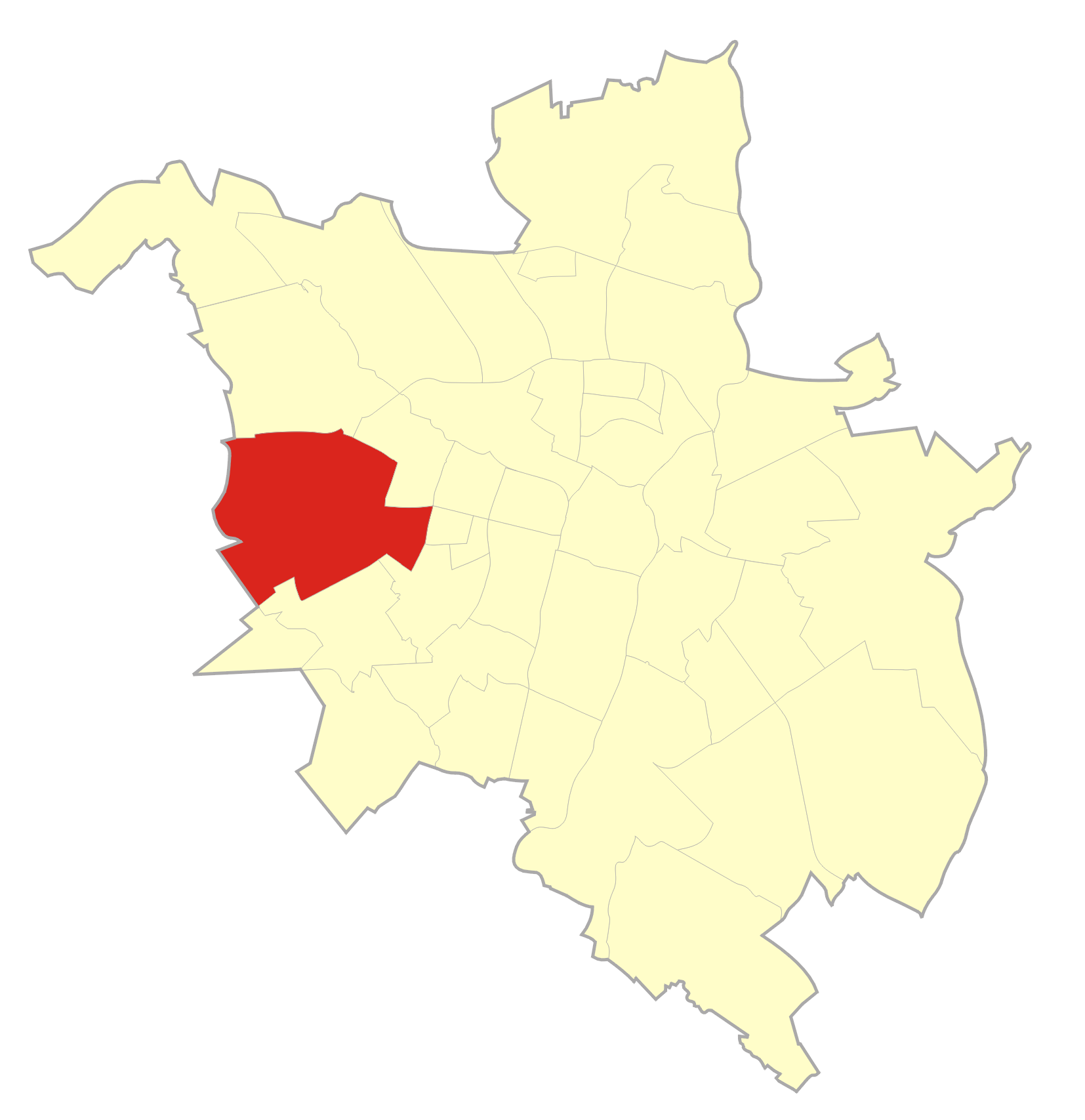
- Interactive map of Ławica
- Coordinates: 52°24′47″N 16°49′40″E
- Country: Poland
- Voivodeship: Greater Poland
- City: Poznań
- City district: Grunwald
- First mention: c.1400
- Incorporated into city limits: 1940

Population (2010)
  - Total: 6,312
- Time zone: UTC+1 (CET)
  - Summer (DST): UTC+2 (CEST)
- Postal code: 60-XXX
- Telephone code: (+48) 61
- Vehicle registration: PO; PY
- SIMC: 1008021
- Website: www.osiedlelawica.pl

Ławica, formerly a village, is an official neighbourhood and administrative area within Grunwald, in the city of Poznań, Greater Poland.

== History ==
Its first mention was around the year 1400, where is it was a village within the gmina of Żabikowo (now a part of Luboń).

Since the 20th Century it became a major transport hub especially with the Poznań-Ławica Airport, which was captured by on 6 January 1919 in the Battle of Ławica by the Greater Polish insurgents together with equipment worth 200 million ℳ including; 26 operational aircraft, around 400 dismantled ones, of which about 100 were suitable for scrapping; most of them were later completed and became part of the Polish military air force.

In 1940 the area was incorporated into the city limits. In 1977 the Tor Poznań racing circuit was opened.

Currently it is also a major residential neighbourhood with detached and semi-detached single family homes.

== Bibliography ==
- Włodzimierz Łęcki; Piotr Maluśkiewicz (1986), Poznań od A do Z (in Polish), Poznań: KAW, p. 78, ISBN 83-03-01260-6, OCLC 835895412
- Poznań – plan miasta i okolic 1:20.000 (in Polish), Poznań: Wydawnictwo Pietruska & Mierkiewicz, 2004, ISBN 83-87157-01-5
- Poznań plus 22 - atlas (in Polish), Warsaw: Wydawnictwo Demart, 2008, ISBN 83-7427-206-6
- Poznań - atlas aglomeracji 1:15.000 (in Polish), Poznań: CartoMedia/Pietruska & Mierkiewicz, 2008, ISBN 978-83-7445-018-8
