= Battle of Saint Hilaire-le-Grand =

The Battle of Saint Hilaire-le-Grand took place on July 25, 1918, during World War I. The 1st Polish Rifles Regiment, which was part of the French Army in World War I, clashed with forces of the German Empire near Saint-Hilaire-le-Grand, Marne department, in northeastern France.

After dissolution of the so-called Bayonne Legion (Legion Bajończyków), which existed from 1914 to 1915, no other ethnic Polish unit was created within the French Army. French authorities were well aware of the position of the Russian Empire, which strongly opposed any kind of Polish independence movement. The situation changed after the February Revolution of 1917, when Western Powers realized that Russia was no longer a major player in the conflict.

Due to efforts of Polish organizations in France, such as the Committee of Polish Volunteers and the Polish National Committee, on June 4, 1917, French President Raymond Poincaré signed a decree, in which he created the Polish Army in France. On January 10, 1918, the 1st Polish Rifles Regiment began training volunteers, many of whom were Polish immigrants to the United States, Brazil and other countries. In June 1918, the 1st Polish Rifle Division was created, and by July, this unit had 10,000 soldiers, commanded by General Józef Haller, who had come to France from Russia.

In July and August 1918, Polish regiments were sent to different sectors of the front in the Vosges Mountains and Champagne. The 1st Chevau-léger Regiment, together with sappers, was sent to the area of Saint-Hilaire-le-Grand. On July 5, the Poles attacked German positions there, capturing 120 prisoners, together with 12 heavy machine guns.

Soon after the battle, three Polish Chevau-léger regiments were merged into the 1st Rifle Division, and the united force guarded the French-German frontline from Rambervillers to Raon-l'Étape. In November 1918, the division was tasked with capturing Saarbrücken, but after the Armistice of 11 November 1918, it was no longer necessary.

In April and May 1919, all units of the Blue Army were sent to Poland, where they participated in the Polish–Soviet War and the Polish–Ukrainian War.

The Battle of Saint Hilaire-le-Grand is commemorated on the Tomb of the Unknown Soldier, Warsaw, with the inscription "St. Hilaire le Gd kolo Reims 25 VII 1918".

== Sources ==
- Mieczysław Wrzosek, Polskie formacje wojskowe podczas I wojny światowej, Białystok 1977, s.468–469
