= Tomb of the Unknown Soldier, Warsaw =

Monument

Coordinates: 52°14′28″N 21°00′41″E

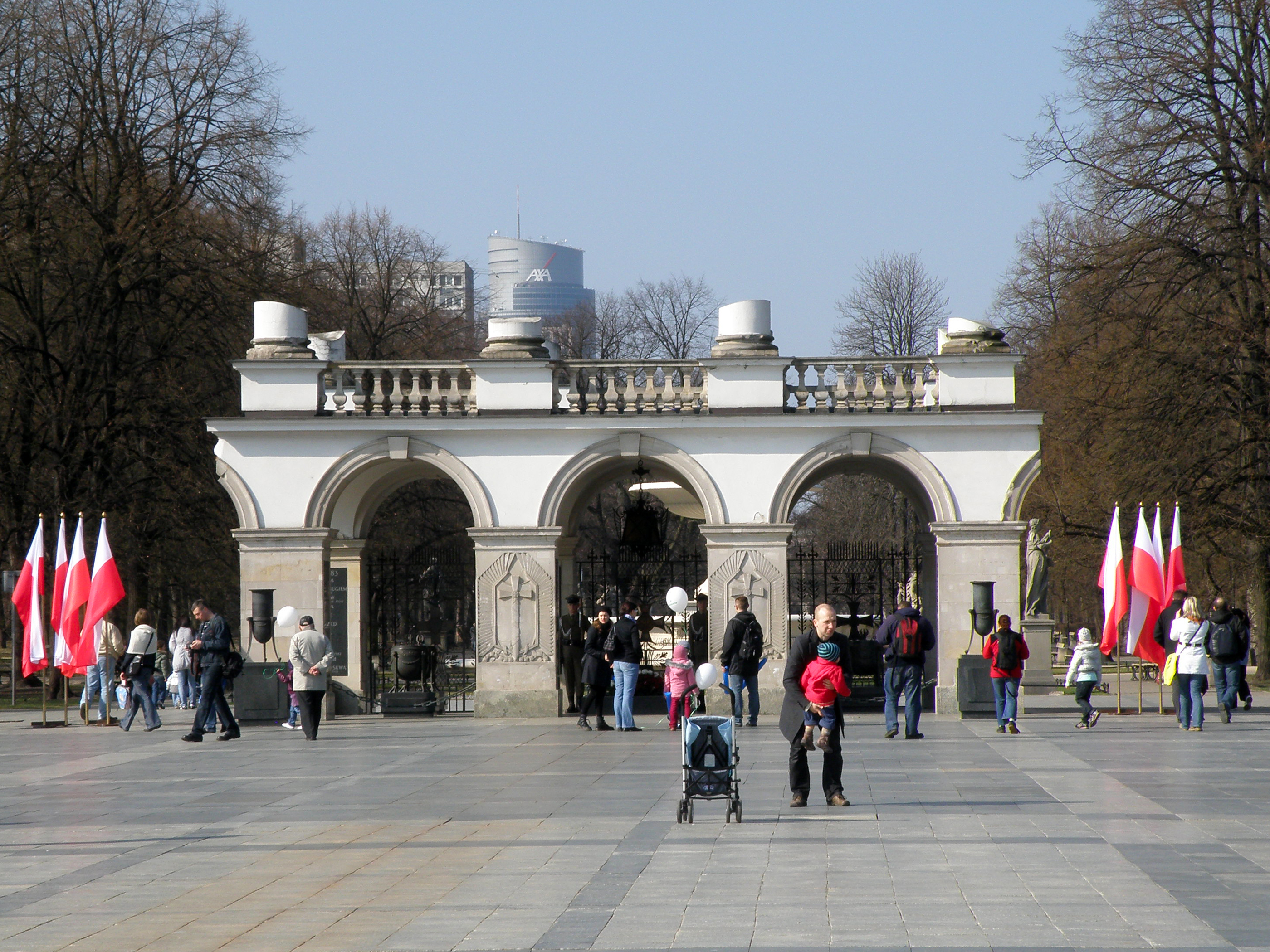
Tomb of the Unknown Soldier

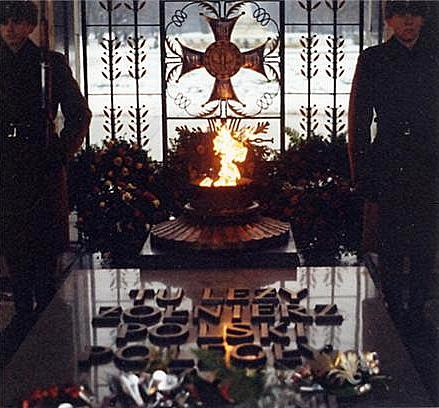
Inscription: Tu leży żołnierz polski poległy za Ojczyznę Trans.: "Here lies a Polish soldier fallen for the Homeland"

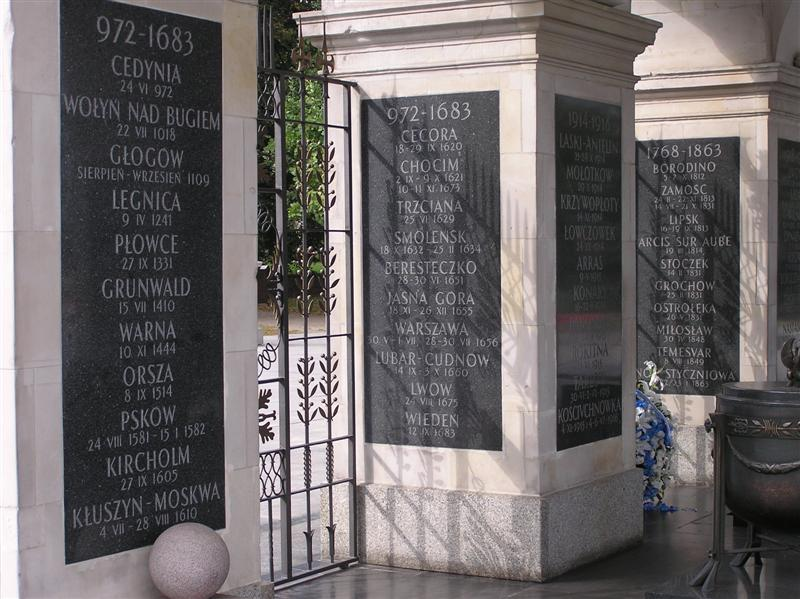
Tablets with names and dates of significant battles in Polish history

The Tomb of the Unknown Soldier (Polish: Grób Nieznanego Żołnierza) is a monument in Warsaw, Poland, dedicated to the unknown soldiers who have given their lives for Poland. It is one of many such national tombs of unknowns that were erected after World War I, and the most important such monument in Poland.

The monument, located at Piłsudski Square, is the only surviving part of the Saxon Palace that occupied the spot until World War II. Since 2 November 1925 the tomb houses the unidentified body of a young soldier who fell during the Defence of Lwów. Since then, earth from numerous battlefields where Polish soldiers have fought has been added to the urns housed in the surviving pillars of the Saxon Palace.

The Tomb is lit by an eternal flame and assisted by a guard post provided by the three companies of the 1st Guards Battalion, Representative Regiment of the Polish Armed Forces. Most official military commemorations in Poland take place at the Tomb, and it is where foreign representatives lay wreaths when visiting Poland.

The changing of the guard takes place every full hour, 365 days a year.

== History ==
In 1923, a group of unknown Varsovians placed, before Warsaw's Saxon Palace and the adjacent Saxon Garden, a stone tablet commemorating all the unknown Polish soldiers who had fallen in World War I and the subsequent Polish-Soviet War. This initiative was taken up by several Warsaw newspapers and by General Władysław Sikorski. On April 4, 1925, the Polish Ministry of War selected a battlefield from which the ashes of an unknown soldier would be brought to Warsaw. Of some 40 battles, that for Lwów was chosen. In October 1925, at Lwów's Cemetery of the Defenders of Lwów, three coffins were exhumed: those of an unknown sergeant, corporal, and private. The coffin that was to be transported to Warsaw was chosen by Jadwiga Zarugiewiczowa, mother of a soldier who had fallen at Zadwórze and whose body had never been found.

On November 2, 1925, the coffin was brought to Warsaw's St. John's Cathedral, where a Mass was held. Afterward eight recipients of the order of Virtuti Militari bore the coffin to its final resting place beneath the colonnade joining the two wings of the Saxon Palace. The coffin was buried along with 14 urns containing soil from as many battlegrounds, a Virtuti Militari medal, and a memorial tablet. Since then, except under German occupation during World War II, an honor guard has continuously been held before the Tomb.

On November 11, 2016, during the ceremony, President Andrzej Duda unveiled a new stone tablet commemorating 9 military rescue actions of prisoners from the custody of the Polish People's Republic security services, carried out by the cursed soldiers.

On November 10, 2017, Polish Minister of National Defence Antoni Macierewicz unveiled two new tablets commemorating a polish self-defense soldier who defended himself in 21 locations against the Ukrainian Insurgent Army and the Organisation of Ukrainian Nationalists during massacres of Poles in Volhynia and Eastern Galicia. On 9th November, a day before the ceremony, 'Bircza (1945–1946)' was removed from the tablets. In March 2026, separate battles in Bircza from 1939 and 1945-1946 were added to two tablets.

== Architecture ==
The Tomb was designed by the famous Polish sculptor, Stanisław Kazimierz Ostrowski. It was located within the arcade that linked the two symmetrical wings of the Saxon Palace, then the seat of the Polish Ministry of War. The central tablet was ringed by 5 eternal flames and 4 stone tablets bearing the names and dates of battles in which Polish soldiers had fought during World War I and the Polish–Soviet War (1919–21). Behind the Tomb were two steel gratings bearing emblems of Poland's two highest Polish military decorations—the Virtuti Militari and Cross of Valor.

During the 1939 invasion of Poland, the building was slightly damaged by German aerial bombing, but it was quickly rebuilt and seized by the German authorities. After the Warsaw Uprising, in December 1944, the palace was completely demolished by the Wehrmacht. Only part of the central colonnade, sheltering the Tomb, was preserved. Although German sappers were ordered to demolish the entire palace they refused to demolish the section that housed the tomb and its memorial. The original damaged walls either side of the present building are still in evidence.

After the war, in late 1945, reconstruction began. Only a small part of the palace, containing the Tomb, was restored by Henryk Grunwald. On 8 May 1946 it was opened to the public. Soil from 24 additional battlegrounds was added to the urns, as well as more tablets with names of battles in which Poles had fought in the Spanish Civil War and World War II. However, the government of the Polish People's Republic erased all trace of the Polish–Soviet War of 1920 as a goodwill gesture towards the Soviet Union, and only a few of the Polish Armed Forces' battles in the West were included. In the years following the end of communism in Poland in 1989, the names of Polish-Soviet War battles were restored, the names of Spanish Civil War battles were erased, and tablets containing the names of battles fought by the cursed soldiers were added.

In August 2022 ground works started on rebuilding the Saxon Palace, after the Polish Government announced a plan for reconstruction. It is expected to be completed by 2030.

=== Battles currently featured on the stone tablets ===
972–1683: Cedynia 24 VI 972; Wołyń nad Bugiem 22 VII 1018; Głogów August – September 1109; Legnica 9 IV 1241; Płowce 27 IX 1331; Grunwald 15 VII 1410; Warna 10 XI 1444; Orsza 8 IX 1514; Psków 24 VIII 1581-15 I 1582; Kircholm 27 IX 1605; Kłuszyn-Moskwa 4 VII-28 VIII 1610	972–1683: Cecora 18-29 IX 1620; Chocim 2 IX-9 X 1621 / 10-11 XI 1673; Trzciana 25 VI 1629; Smoleńsk 18 X 1632-25 II 1634; Beresteczko 28-30 VI 1651; Jasna Góra 18 XI-26 XII 1655; Warszawa 30 V-1 VII, 28-30 VII 1656; Cudnów 14 IX-3 X 1660; Lwów 24 VIII 1675; Wiedeń 12 IX 1683	1768–1863: Konfederacja barska 29 II 1768–18 VIII 1772; Zieleńce 18 VI 1792; Racławice 4 IV 1794; Warszawa 17 IV-4 XI 1794; Warszawa 6-8 IX 1831; Wilno 22 IV-13 VIII 1794; Maciejowice 10 X 1794; Trebbia 17-19 VI 1799; Somosierra 10 XI 1808; Raszyn 19 IV 1809; Smoleńsk 17 VIII 1812
1768–1863: Borodino 5-7 X 1812; Zamość 24 I-22 XI 1813/14 VII-21 X 1831; Lipsk 16-19 X 1813; Arcis sur Aube 19 III 1814; Stoczek 14 II 1831; Grochów 22 II 1831; Ostrołęka 26 V 1831; Miłosław 30 IV 1848; Temesvar 8 VIII 1849; Noc styczniowa 22/23 I 1863	Sybiria since 1768; Cytadela Warszawa 1833–1915; Łukiszki 1861–1864, 1940–1945; Poznań VII Fort 1939–1945; Pawiak-Al. Szucha 1939–1944; Montelupich-Brygidki-Zamek Lubelski 1939–1945; Łubianka-Butryki 1939–1945; Katyń-Charków-Miednoje 1940; Ciepielów 9 IX 1939; Osuchy 25-26 VI 1944; Podgaje 31 I 1945	1863–1921: Małogoszcz 24 II 1863; Ginietynie 21 IV 1863; Horki 17-25 V 1863; Miropol 17 V 1863; Żyrzyn 8 VIII 1863; Iłża 17 I 1864; Trans-Baikal Uprising 1866; Armed Resistance 1904–1908; Poznań-Ławica 28 XII 1918-6 I 1919; Rawicz 9 II 1919
1863–1921: Cieszyn-Skoczów 23-26 I 1919; Ostrołęka 5 VIII 1920; Zadwórze 17 VIII 1920; Dęblin – Mińsk Mazowiecki 16-18 VIII 1920; Cyców 16 VIII 1920; Białystok 22 i 30 VIII 1920; Sejny 2-10 i 22 IX 1920; Mińsk Litewski 15 X 1920; Bytom 16 VIII 1919; Katowice 19 VIII 1920; Góra Świętej Anny 21-27 V 1921	1914–1918: Laski-Anielin 1914; Mołotków 29 X 1914; Krzywopłoty 14 XI 1914; Łowczówek 24 XII 1914; Arras 9 V 1915; Konary 16-22 V 1915; Pakosław 19-20 V 1915; Rokitna 13 VI 1915; Tarłów 30 VI-2 VII 1915; Kosciuchnówka 4 XI 1915 i 4-6 VII 1916	1914–1918: Krechowce 24 VII 1917; Bobrujsk 2 II-11 III 1918; Kaniów 11 V 1918; Murmań 1918; Syberia 1918–1920; Kubań-Odessa 1918–1919; St. Hilaire Le Garde near Reims 25 VII 1918; Powstania wielkopolskie; Powstania górnośląskie
1918–1920: Lwów listopad 1918-marzec 1919; Lida 16 IV 1919 i 28 IX 1920; Wilno 19 IV 1919 – 9 X 1920; Dyneburg 3 I 1920; Kijów 7 V-11 VI 1920; Borodzianka 11-13 VI 1920; Chorupań pod Dubnem 19 VII 1920; Nastasów pod Tarnopolem 31 VII-6 VIII 1920; Radzymin-Ossów 13-15 VIII 1920	1918–1920: Borkowo pod Nasielskiem 14-15 VIII 1920; Sarnowa Góra pod Ciechanowem 16-20 VIII 1920; Przasnysz 21-22 VIII 1920; Komarów-Hrubieszów 30 VIII-1 IX 1920; Kobryń 14-15 IX 1920; Dytiatyń 16 IX 1920; Brzostowice 20 IX 1920; Grodno-Obuchowo 20-25 IX 1920; Krwawy Bór pod Papiernią 27-28 IX 1920	1939–1945: Westerplatte-Oksywie-Hel 1 IX-2 X 1939; Krojanty 1 IX 1939; Bory Tucholskie 1-3 IX 1939; Mława 1-3 IX 1939; Mokra 1-2 IX 1939; Obrona Śląska 1-5 IX 1939; Piotrków-Tomaszów Mazowiecki 5-7 IX 1939; Iłża 8 IX 1939; Wizna 8-10 IX 1939
1939–1945: Warszawa-Modlin 8-29 IX 1939; Bzura 9-22 IX 1939; Kałuszyn 11-12 IX 1939; Lwów 12-22 IX 1939 / 22-26 VII 1944; Bircza 12 IX 1939; Boratycze 14 IX 1939; Tomaszów Lubelski 17-27 IX 1939; Obrona Granicy Wschodniej RP 17 IX-1 X 1939; Grodno 2-22 IX 1939; Szack-Wytyczno 28 IX-1 X 1939; Kock 2-5 X 1939	1939–1945: Akcje Podziemia 1939–1945; Góry Świętokrzyskie 1939–1945; Narvik 12 V-6 VI 1940; Lagarde 17-18 VI 1940; Clos du Doubs 18-19 VI 1940; Tobruk 22 VIII-10 XII 1941; Zamojszczyzna 30 XII 1942-5 II 1943; Getto warszawskie 19 IV-8 V 1943; Lenino 12-13 X 1943; Kowel-Włodzimierz Wołyński 19 I-21 V 1944	1939–1945: Monte Cassino 11-25 V 1944; Lasy Janowskie-Puszcza Solska 9-25 VI 1944; Operacja "Burza" czerwiec-wrzesień 1944; Wilno 7-13 VII 1944; Ancona 17-18 VII 1944; Wisła-Praga 29 VII-2 X 1944; Powstanie warszawskie 1 VIII-2 X 1944; Falaise-Chambois 8-21 VIII 1944; Surkonty 21 VIII 1944; Arnhem 18-25 IX 1944
1939–1945: Breda 29-30 X 1944; Wał Pomorski 1-10 II 1945; Cytadela Poznańska 21-23 II 1945; Kołobrzeg 8-18 III 1945; Bolonia 9-21 IV 1945; Odra 16-20 IV 1945; Nysa Łużycka 16-19 IV 1945; Budziszyn 23-28 IV 1945; Wilhelmshaven 24 IV-5 V 1945; Berlin 26 IV-2 V 1945	Żołnierze Wyklęci 1945–1963: Rudniki 6 I 1945; Rowiny 29 I 1945; Kuryłówka 7 V 1945; Las Stocki 24 V 1945; Obława Augustowska 12-21 VII 1945; Miodusy Pokrzywne 18 VIII 1945; Zwoleń 15 VI 1946; Raczkowszczyzna 12 V 1949; Majdan Kozic Górnych 21 X 1963	Żołnierze Wyklęci 1945–1963: Puławy 24 IV 1945; Grajewo 8-9 V 1945; Rembertów 20-21 V 1945; Kielce 4-5 VIII 1945; Radom 9 IX 1945; Radomsko 19-20 IV 1946; Zamość 8 V 1946; Włodawa 22 X 1946; Pułtusk 25 XI 1946
Navy: Oliwa 28 XI 1627; Czarnobyl 27 IV 1920; Bałtyk 1 IX-5 X 1939; Morze Północne 3 IX 1939-8 V 1945; Atlantyk 9 IX 1939-8 V 1945; Morze Śródziemne 11 VI 1940–30 XII 1944; Morze Barentsa 20 VII 1941–10 I 1944; Zatoka Salerno 8-16 IX 1943; Inwazja Normandii 6 VI 1944; Konwoje 1939–1945	Air force: Lwów 5 XI 1918; Operacja Warszawska, Bitwy nad Wisłą Operacja Niemeńska nad Niemnem sierpień-wrzesień 1920; Obrona Polski wrzesień 1939; Battle of Britain 10 VII-31 X 1940; Niemcy 24 III 1941-4 V 1945; Loty do Polski 1941–1945; Bitwa o Atlantyk 10 V 1942-8 V 1945; Tunezja 17 III-12 V 1943; Normandia 6 VI 1944; Brandenburgia 16 IV-4 V 1945	Wołyń, Małopolska Wschodnia, Lubelszczyzna 1943–1946: Huta Stepańska-Wyrka III-VII 1943; Przebraże III 1943-III 1944; Pańska Dolina V 1943-III 1944; Rybcza III 1943-III 1944; Zasmyki VII 1943-IV 1944; Jagodzin-Rymacze IX 1943-IV 1944; Kupiczów XI 1943-III 1944; Hanaczów XI 1943-V 1944; Stanisłowka XII 1943-IV 1944
Wołyń, Małopolska Wschodnia, Lubelszczyzna 1943–1946: Łukowiec Wiszniowski – Łukowiec Żurawski 1943–1945; Puzów – Stężarzyce 8 II 1944; Korytnica 12 III 1944; Biłka Królewska – Biłka Szlachecka III-VI 1944; Narol 21-22 V 1944; Posadów – Rzeczyca 2 VI 1944; Bircza 1945–1946

== Gallery ==
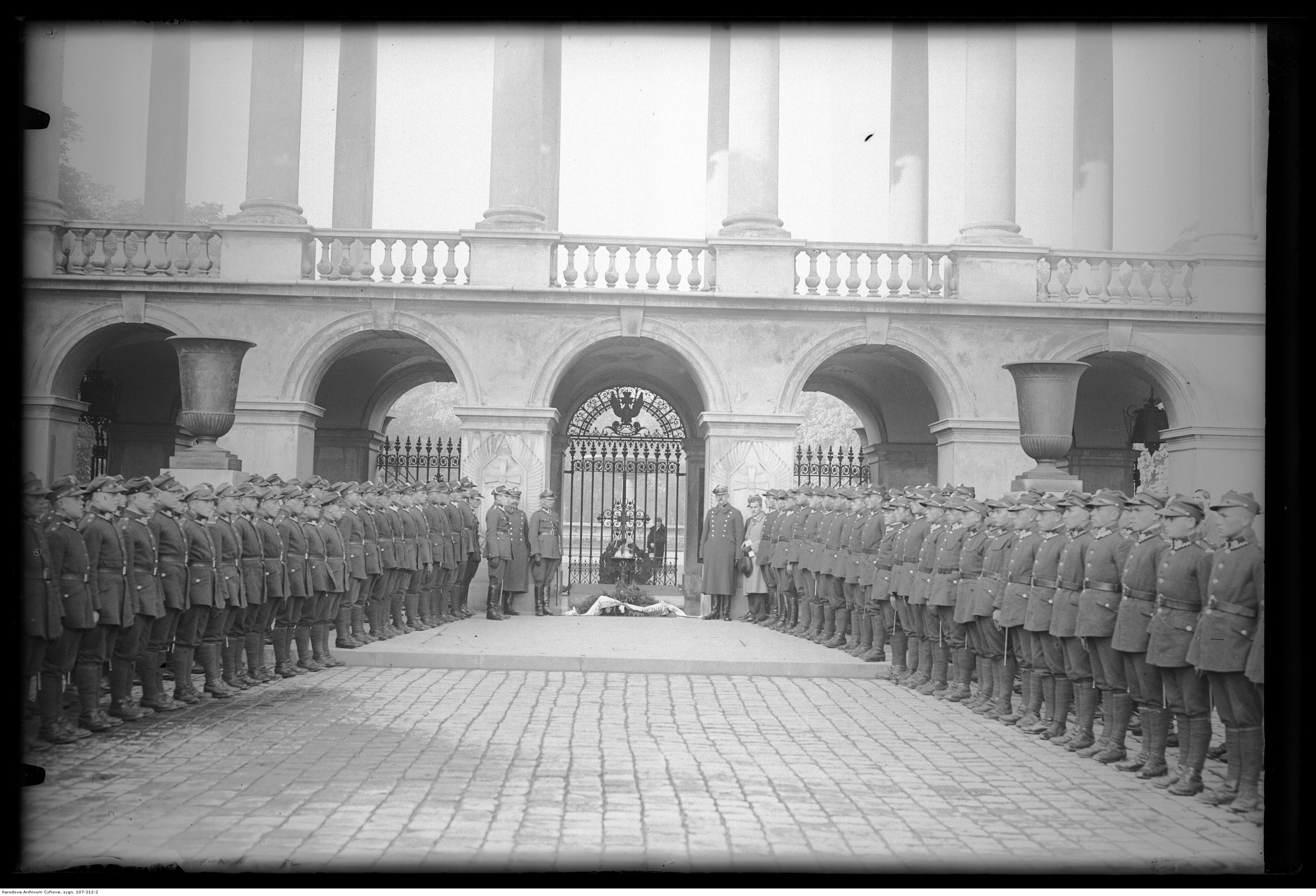
Tomb of the Unknown Soldier as a part of the Saxon Palace in 1928

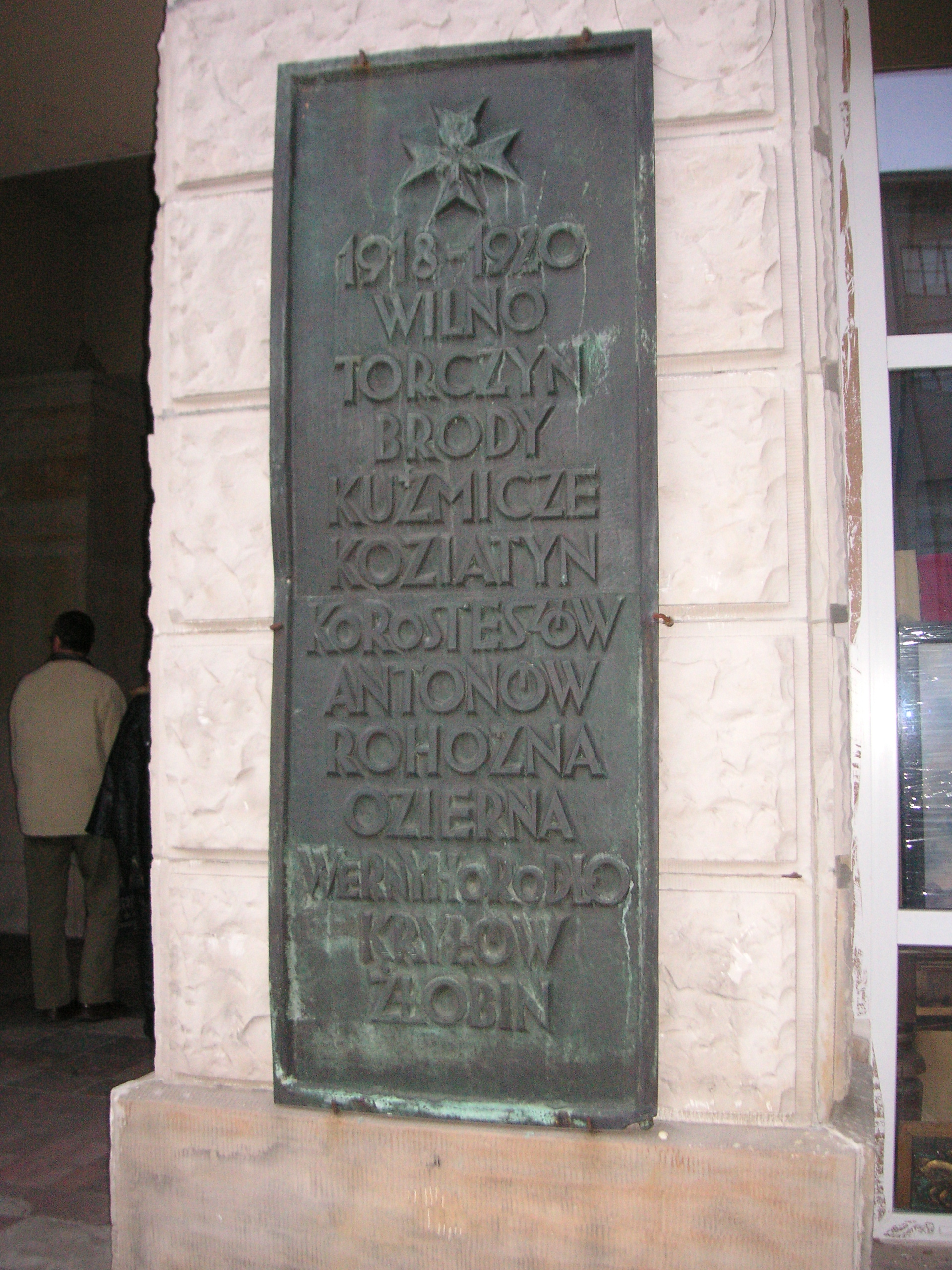
An original tablet from the Tomb

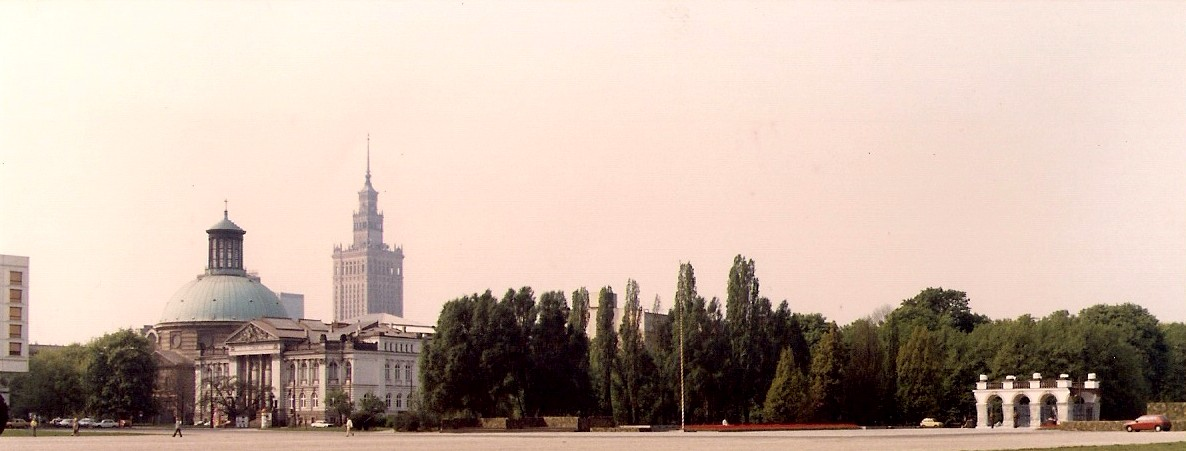
Tomb of the Unknown Soldier (far right) with (from left) Evangelical Church, the Zachęta art gallery, and, in background, Palace of Culture and Science

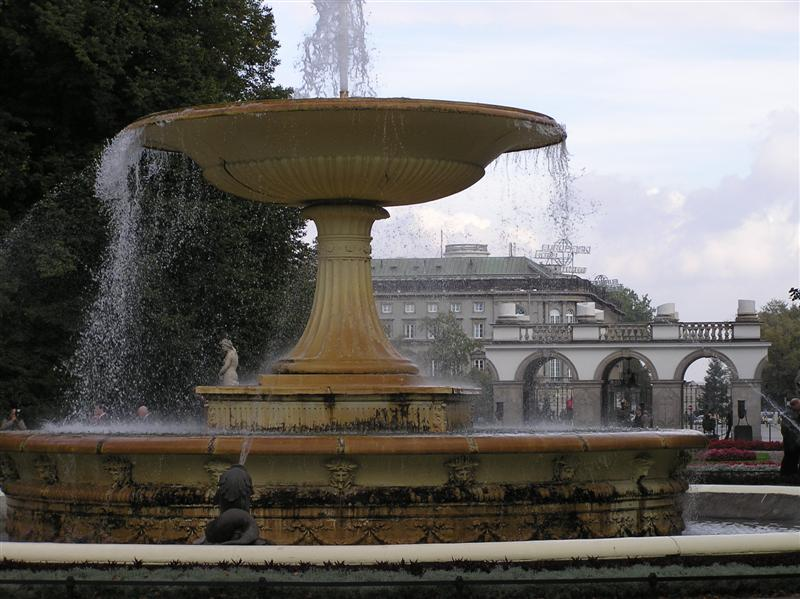
Saxon Garden, with Tomb in background

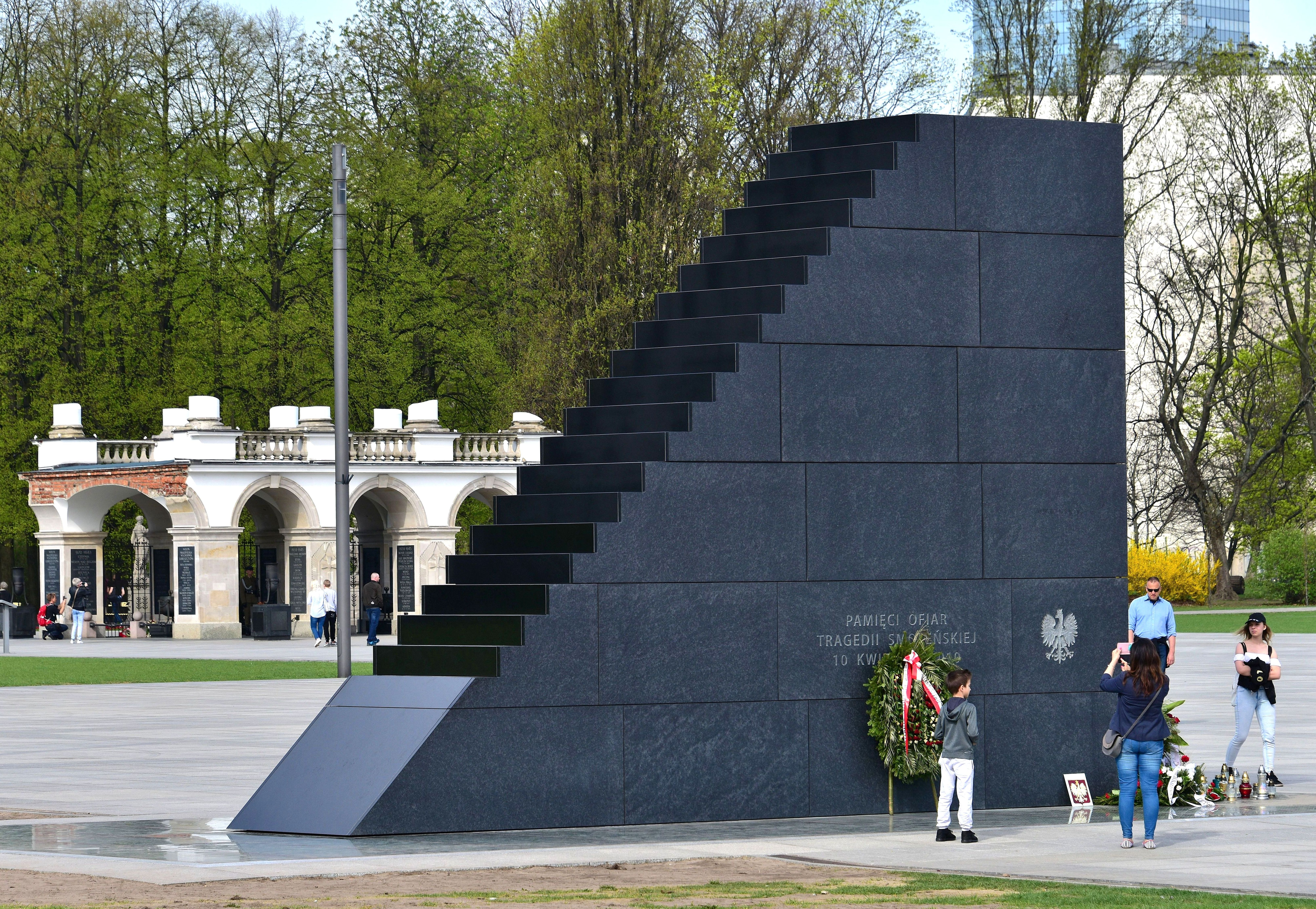
Monument to the victims of 2010 Smolensk air crash, in front of the Tomb of the Unknown Soldier

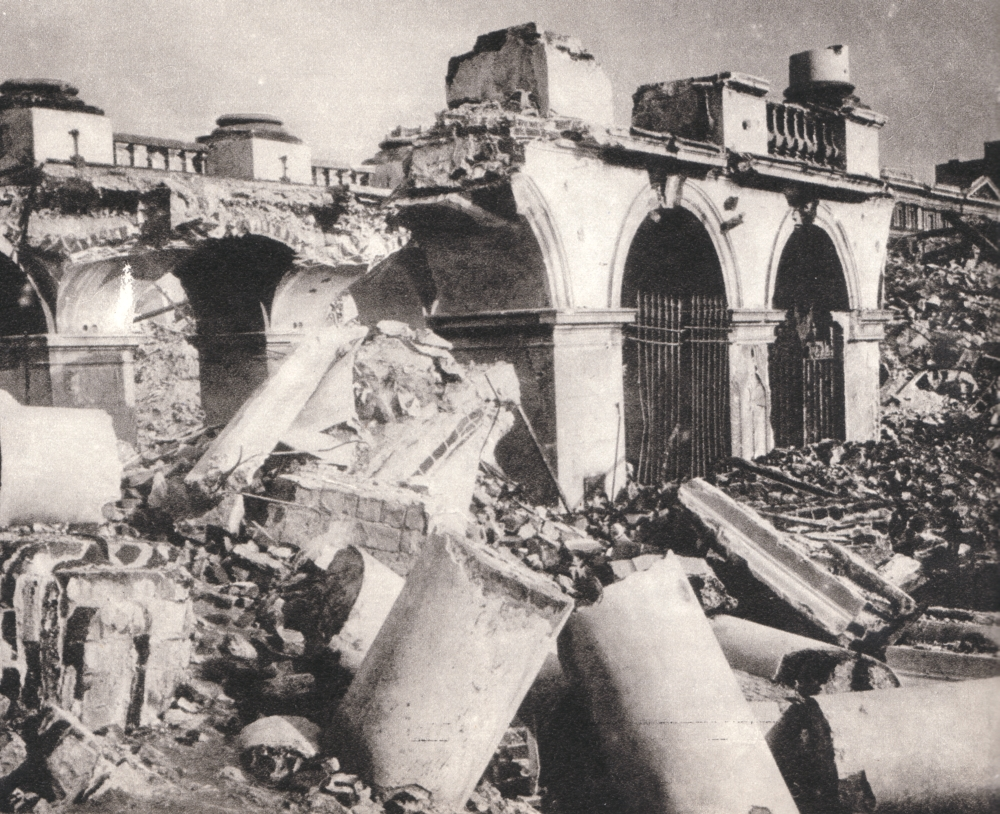
Remains of the Saxon Palace and the Tomb of the Unknown Soldier, 1945, after the destruction of Warsaw
