= Battle of Clos du Doubs =

1940 battle of the Fall of France

The Battle of Clos du Doubs took place between 18 and 20 June 1940 during the Battle of France. The Polish 2nd Rifle Division, commanded by General Bronislaw Prugar-Ketling, defended the frontline in the area of the Clos du Doubs, located near the French-Swiss border. The task of the Poles was to close all the roads leading to Switzerland, and to achieve this, General Prugar-Ketling divided his forces into two parts: southern (4th Warsaw Rifle Regiment, commanded by Colonel Aleksander Gembal), and northern (9th Kresy Infantry Regiment, commanded by Colonel Stanislaw Bien).

On 18 June, at about 1:30 pm, Polish forces exchanged fire with the advancing Wehrmacht. At 4 pm, two reinforced battalions of German infantry, supported by artillery, captured the town of Maiche. One hour later, Polish officers gathered at a meeting, during which they discussed a possible evacuation to Switzerland or a retreat to southern France. In the evening, however, the Poles were ordered to man the frontline between Saint-Hippolyte, Doubs and the Swiss border near Charmauvillers.

In the night of 18–19 June, Polish units moved to the new positions. The German assault on Damprichard and Saint-Hippolyte began in the morning, and after capturing both towns, the Germans moved towards Trevillers. Polish losses were heavy, and lacking support from their demoralized French allies, who retreated in panic, the Poles decided to cross the Swiss border. This took place on the night of 19–20 June.

On 15 December 1942, Swiss Army headquarters, with General Henri Guisan, created a defensive plan in case of German invasion. The Polish 2nd Rifle Division, with its 10,508 soldiers and officers, was supposed to join the Swiss forces.

The Battle of Clos du Doubs is commemorated at the Tomb of the Unknown Soldier, Warsaw.

== Sources ==
- Boje polskie 1939–1945: przewodnik encyklopedyczny by Krzysztof Komorowski, page 77 – 79
