= Battle of Miropol =

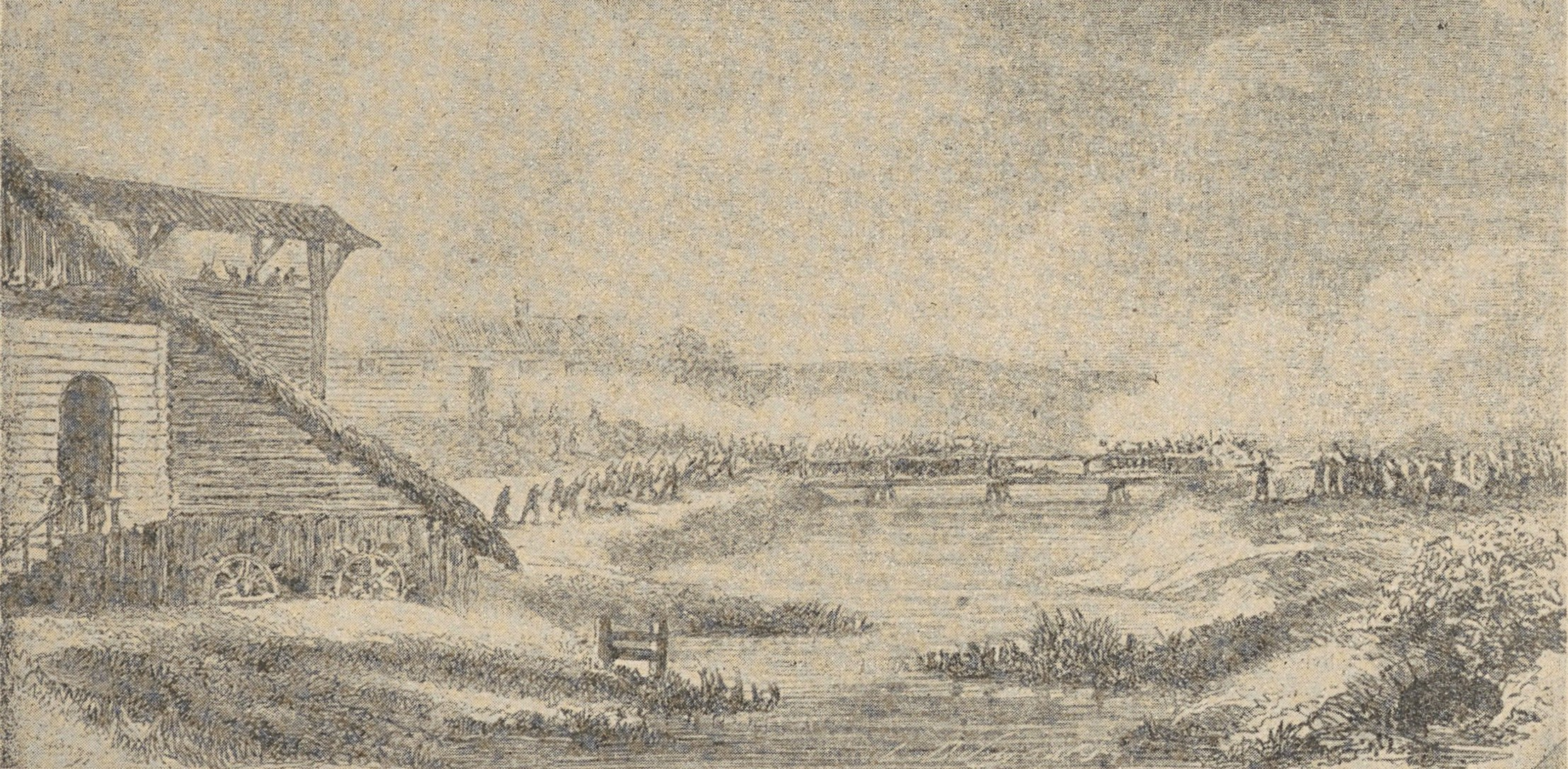
Battle of the Sluch River near Miropol in May 1863 (19th-century drawing)

The Battle of Miropol took place on May 16–17, 1863, near the town of Miropol, Volhynia, Russian Empire, during the January Uprising. A unit of 850 Polish rebels under General Edmund Rozycki clashed with a cavalry regiment (300 Cossacks) of the Imperial Russian Army, commanded by Captain Kaznakow. The battle ended in Russian victory.

In early spring 1863, the January Uprising, which began on the territory of Russian-controlled Congress Poland, spread over to western provinces of the Russian Empire, the so-called Western Krai, or Ziemie Zabrane (Stolen Lands). In Samogitia, the rebellion was led by Zygmunt Sierakowski and Rev. Antoni Mackiewicz, in Belarus by Konstanty Kalinowski and Romuald Traugutt, while in Ukrainian territories, including Volhynia and Podolia, it was commanded by General Edmund Rozycki.

With local volunteers, Rozycki created Regiment of Volhynian Cavalry. Most of this units consisted of members of the lower classes, as local magnates did not support the insurrection. To draw Ukrainian peasantry, members of Provincial Office of the Polish National Government issued an appeal, the so-called Golden Paper, in which they promised land plots. Polish activists in Volhynia and Podolia demanded the entry of strong rebel forces from Austrian Galicia, but Adam Stanislaw Sapieha did not support this demand. Under the circumstances, General Rozycki decided to start the insurrection in Volhynia and the area of Kiev in May 1863. Still, local peasants failed to support the rebels.

The insurrection in Ukraine began on May 8, when a rebel unit of 850 cavalry left Zytomierz. On the next day, Rozycki captured the town of Liubar without fighting. On May 12, the Poles seized Polonne, and stayed there for five days, waiting for reinforcements. Finally, the rebels headed eastwards, meeting the Russians at Miropol (Myropil). The battle lasted for two days, ending in retreat of Rozycki and his men. Nevertheless, rebel army was not destroyed. Instead, it was divided into two columns: the Russians eliminated Polish infantry, and then chased Rozycki, who tried to flee to Podolia.

On May 19 Rozycki captured 39 Russians, and then entered Podolia, where he was joined by a 60-men unit under Szaszkiewicz. The rebels tried to capture the town of Chmielnik (Khmilnyk), but their forces were inadequate and they gave up the attempt. Due to lack of popular support for the insurrection, Rozycki headed northwards, to Liubar, where he decided to march to the Austrian border. On May 25 he was defeated by Russians near Laszki. Three days later, remnants of Polish forces entered Austrian Galicia, ending the rebellion in Ukraine.

The Battle of Miropol is commemorated on the Tomb of the Unknown Soldier, Warsaw, with the inscription “MIROPOL 17 V 1863".

== Sources ==
- Stanisław Zieliński, Bitwy i Potyczki 1863–1864, Muzeum Narodowe w Rapperswilu, Rapperswil 1913,
- Dominik Szczęsny-Kostanecki, Kampania Różyckiego, Gazeta Słowo Polskie nr 2, 1-30.09.2012
- Hanna Irena Różycka, Wołyńskie echa Powstania Styczniowego 1863, Kresowy serwis Informacyjny nr 01/2012/(8) z 1.01.2012,
- Mała Encyklopedia Wojskowa, Wydawnictwo Ministerstwa Obrony Narodowej, Warszawa 1971, Wydanie I, Tom 3.
