= Battle of Tarłów =

Battle of Krzywoploty
- Part of the Eastern Front during World War I
Date	30 June – 2 July 1915
Location	Tarlow, Russian Empire (present-day Poland)
Result	Austro-Hungarian victory

Belligerents
Austria-Hungary	Russian Empire

Commanders and leaders
(Austria-Hungary) Józef Piłsudski	Unknown

Units involved
(Austria-Hungary) 1st Brigade of Polish Legions	Unknown

Strength
Unknown	Unknown

Casualties and losses
Unknown	Unknown

The Battle of Tarlow took place on June 30 – July 2, 1915, near the town of Tarlow, which at that time belonged to Russian-controlled Congress Poland. 1st Brigade, Polish Legions (part of the Austro-Hungarian Army), commanded by Józef Piłsudski, clashed with troops of the Imperial Russian Army.

== History ==
In late June 1915, the 1st Brigade reached the village of Wolka Tarlowska, and tried to capture a bridge over the Vistula river, defended by Russian soldiers. The so-called Tarlow Redoubt was a fortified position of the Russians, located on a hill. Both sides suffered heavy losses, especially 1st Battalion of 1st Legions Infantry Regiment, commanded by Major Edward Rydz-Śmigły. Soldiers were buried in mass graves: after World War I, all bodies were moved to a parish cemetery, where a military quarter was created. In July 1929, local community of Tarlow funded a monument dedicated to the soldiers of the Legions.

The Battle of Tarlow is commemorated on the Tomb of the Unknown Soldier, Warsaw, with the inscription "TARLOW 30 VI – 2 VII 1915". The inscription was removed after 1945 by Communist authorities, to return in 1990.

== Sources ==
- Mieczysław Wrzosek, Polski czyn zbrojny podczas pierwszej wojny światowej 1914–1918, Państwowe Wydawnictwo "Wiedza Powszechna", Warszawa 1990
