= Battle of Białystok =

- Part of the Polish–Soviet War
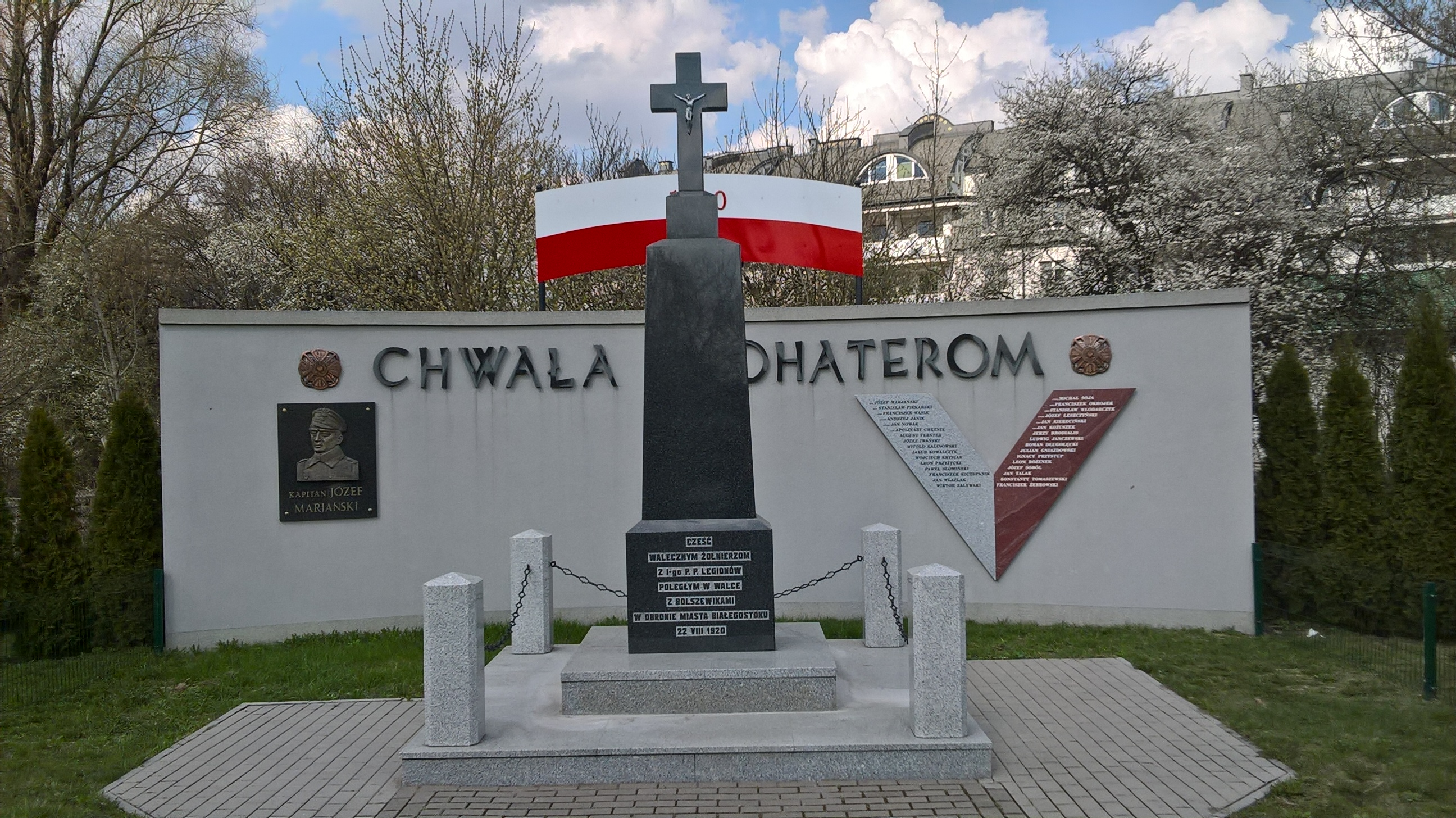
- Monument to Soldiers of the 1st Legions Infantry Regiment who died in the Battle of Białystok
Date	August 22, 1920
Location	Białystok, Poland
Result	Polish victory

Belligerents
Russian SFSR	Poland

Commanders and leaders
Nikolai Sollogub	Zygmunt Wenda; August Emil Fieldorf; Władysław Broniewski; Józef Marjański

Units involved
16th Army	1st Legions Infantry Regiment

Casualties and losses
600 dead and wounded 8,200 captured	209 dead and wounded

The Battle of Białystok was a battle of the Polish–Soviet War that took place near and in Białystok, Poland, on August 22, 1920, between the 1st Legions Infantry Regiment and the remains of the Soviet Russian Red Army 16th Army group and 3rd Army troops in the city of Białystok, which were withdrawing from Warsaw. The confusion caused by the Soviet forces, which had been chased, since their defeat at Warsaw, crushed into the forces stationed in Białystok and caused a complete breakdown in Bolshevik forces.

In the city, fighting took all day and covered the entire Białystok. Individual parts of the city repeatedly passed from Polish to Russian hands and backward. During the battle, several armored trains were used in combat.

== Background ==
On August 16, 1920, Polish forces, concentrated along the Wieprz River and began their counterattack. After 24 hours, it became clear that the Polish advance would threaten the rear of the Soviet 16th Army. By August 20, Poles captured Bug river crossings at Drohiczyn and Frankopol. Forced into retreat, the Soviet 16th Army headed towards Białystok, in a chaotic disorganised march.

Meanwhile, a Polish elite unit, the 1st Legions' Infantry Division, was also marching towards Białystok. On the evening of August 20, its commander, Colonel Stefan Dąb-Biernacki, ordered his soldiers to capture Białystok, together with its railroad junction, and to cut off the enemy's roads of retreat. Dab-Biernacki tasked 1st Legions' Infantry Regiment to carry out the assault. Altogether, Polish forces had some 2,000 soldiers.

On August 21, after a 40 km march, the vanguard companies of the regiment captured the village of Zwierki, 14 kilometers from Białystok. They captured 100 prisoners and nine machine guns, but some Soviet soldiers managed to escape and warned the garrison of Białystok of the Polish raid.

== Battle ==
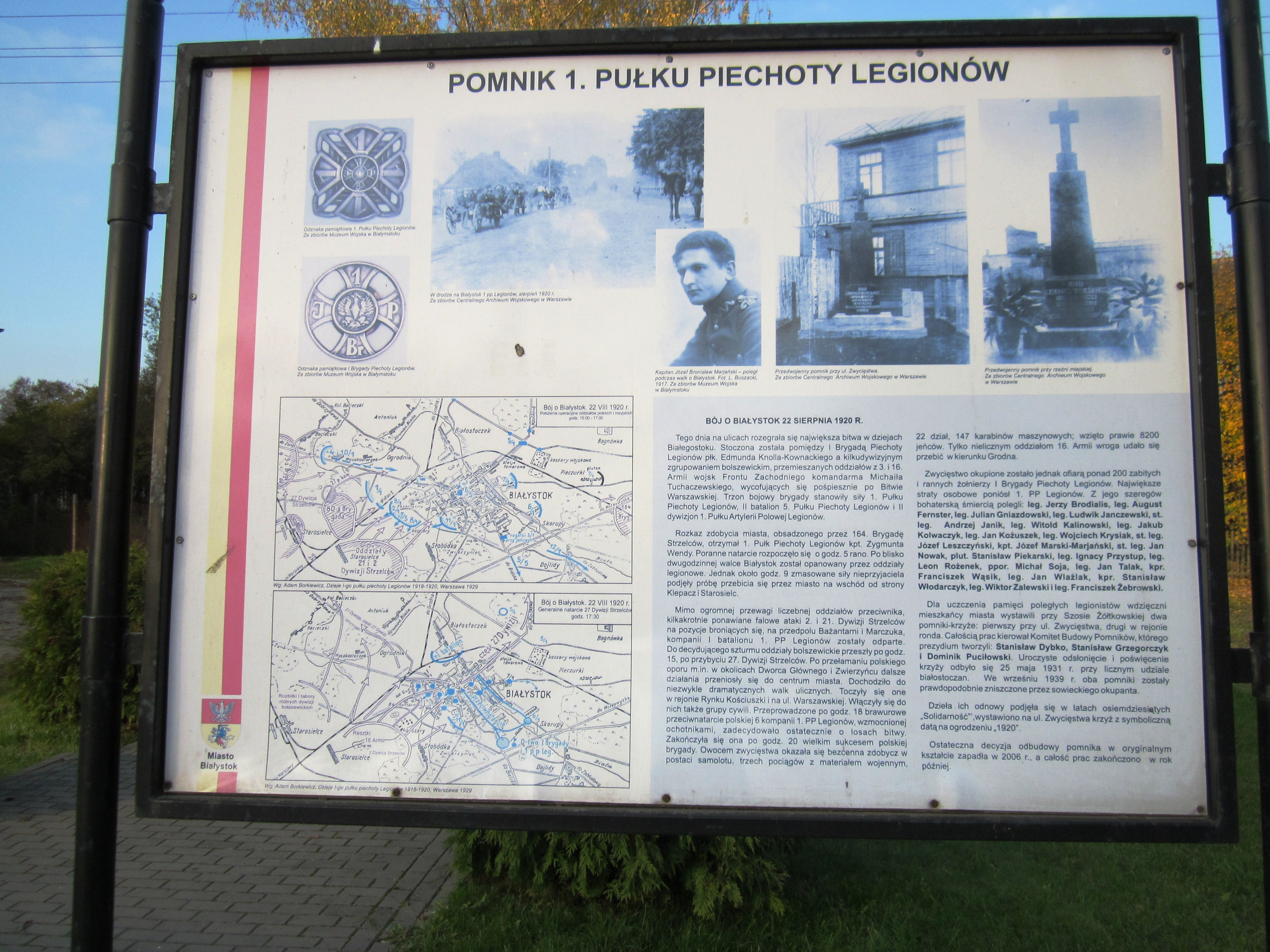
Information board about the monument to soldiers of the 1st Legions Infantry Regiment who died in the Battle of Białystok

The Polish assault began on August 22 at 2 a.m. The city was defended by the 164th Rifle Brigade of the 55th Rifle Division of the Red Army. Soviet forces were supported by cavalry, artillery, and armored train 22. Despite warnings, the defenders of Białystok were surprised by the 3rd Battalion of the 1st Legions' Regiment, under Captain Jozef Marski-Marjanski, which broke into the centre of the city.

By 7 a.m., Białystok was in Polish hands. The 164th Rifle Brigade was completely destroyed, with 2,000 prisoners taken, together with 13 cannons, 30 machine guns and three military trains with food and equipment. Polish forces did not have time to celebrate their victory, as at 8:15 a.m., the first units of Soviet 16th Army approached the city. The enemy advanced without regard to their losses, which forced Poles to retreat, after hand-to-hand combat with bayonets. The situation of the Poles was precarious, but that changed after Captain Marski-Marjanski had gathered several soldiers and initiated a counterattack in which he was joined by other soldiers. The Soviets soon panicked, and in the rout, some 1,000 Soviet prisoners had been taken.

At about 2 p.m., the Soviet 27th Rifle Division appeared in Białystok. An hour later, the Soviets attacked and tried to capture barracks of the former Imperial Russian Army. Enjoying numerical superiority, the Red Army seized the main rail station and entered the centre of Białystok. The Polish retreat was halted when 27th Cavalry Regiment entered the fray. Heavy street fighting lasted for the whole day, with buildings changing hands several times.

== Aftermath ==
The Battle of Białystok ended with the complete destruction of the Soviet 16th Army. Polish losses amounted to 209 dead and wounded, and the Soviets lost over 600 dead and wounded, 8,200 captured, together with 22 cannon, 147 machine guns, one aircraft and three cargo trains.

In the 1930s, a commemorative obelisk was unveiled on Zwyciestwa Street, the location of one of street clashes. The monument bears the name of the fallen during the battle including the commander of the 1st Battalion of the 1st Legions' Infantry Regiment, Captain Józef Marjański after whom a street in the center of the city was named. One of participants of the Battle of Białystok was Emil Fieldorf.

On the Tomb of the Unknown Soldier in Warsaw is the inscription "BIALYSTOK 22 i 30 VIII 1920".
