= 1st Legions Infantry Regiment =

Infantry regiment of the Polish Army

- 1 Pulk Piechoty Legionow Jozefa Pilsudskiego; 1 pp Leg.
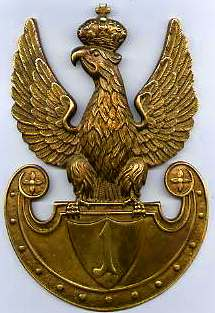
- Eagle of the First Infantry Regiment
- Active: 6 August 1914 – 1917; November 1918 – 23 September 1939
- Country: Austria-Hungary (1914-1917); Poland (1918-1939)
- Branch: Austro-Hungarian Army (1914-1917); Polish Army (1918-1939)
- Role: Infantry
- Part of: Polish Legions (1914-1917); 1st Legions Infantry Division (1919-1939)
- Garrison/HQ: Wilno
- Patron: Józef Piłsudski
- Anniversaries: August 6
- Engagements: World War I: Battle of Łowczówek; Battle of Tarłów; Battle of Kostiuchnówka; Polish–Soviet War: Battle of Daugavpils; Kiev offensive; Battle of Warsaw; Battle of Białystok; Battle of Lida; World War II: Invasion of Poland

First Legions Infantry Regiment of Józef Piłsudski (Polish: 1 Pulk Piechoty Legionow Jozefa Pilsudskiego; 1 pp Leg.) was an infantry regiment of the Polish Army in 1914-1939. Named after Józef Piłsudski, in the Second Polish Republic it was stationed in the city of Wilno.

First Legions Infantry Regiment was the oldest of all regiments of the Polish Army in the interbellum period. Its traditions dated to the First Cadre Company, which on August 6, 1914 marched from the Austrian Partition of Poland (Galicia) into Russian-controlled Congress Poland. Furthermore, it was based on the First Legions Regiment, part of Polish Legions in World War I, which existed from 1914 until 1917, and fought with distinction in the Battle of Łowczówek, Battle of Tarłów and Battle of Kostiuchnówka.

== Polish–Soviet War ==
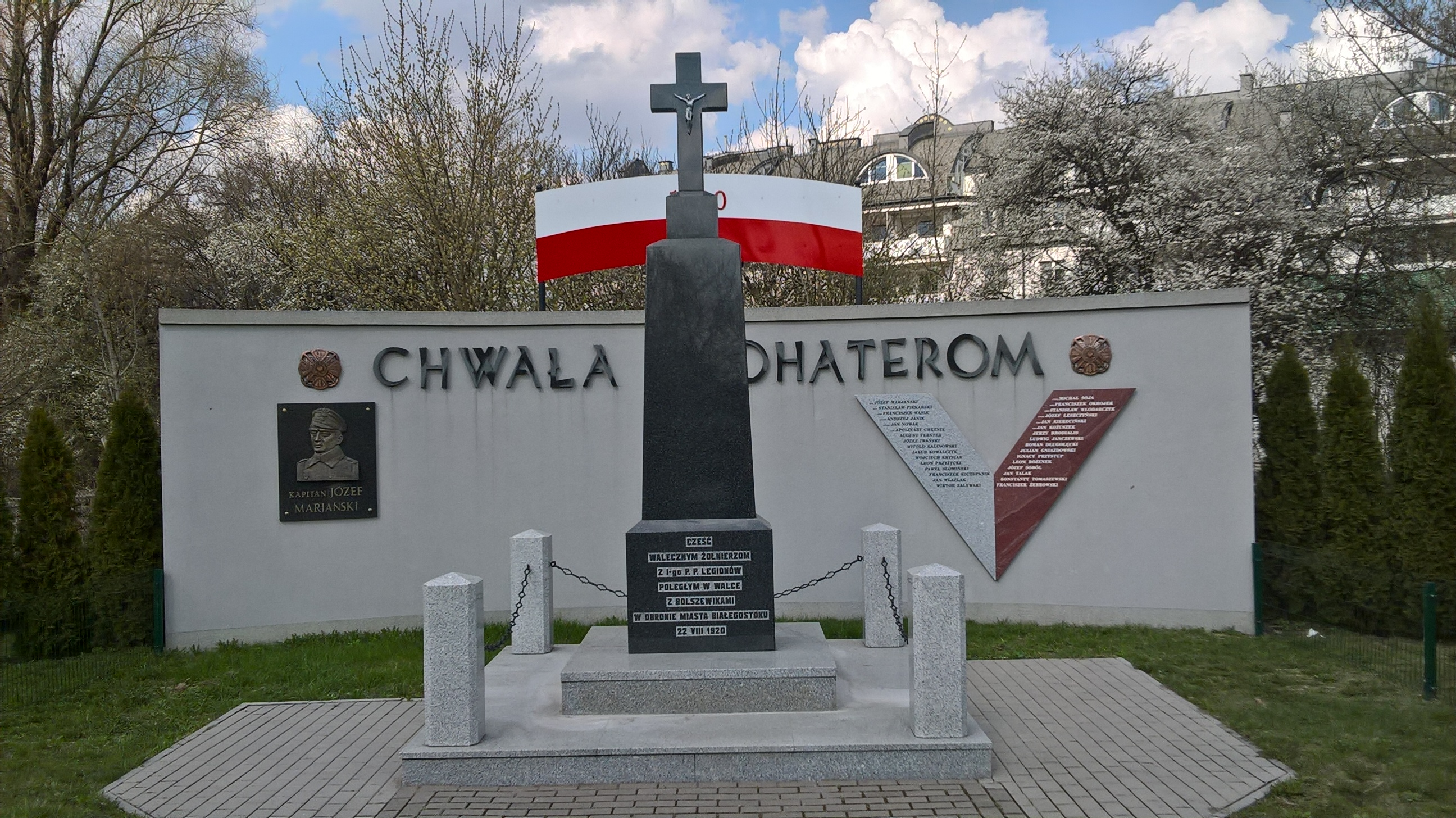
Monument to Soldiers of the 1st Legions Infantry Regiment who died in the Battle of Białystok in 1920

The regiment was formed in November 1918 in Jabłonna and Radzymin near Warsaw. A few months later it joined fighting against the Red Army: in the area of Wilno and in eastern Polish territories (present-day Belarus). In winter of 1919/1920 it took part in the Battle of Daugavpils, and in spring 1920, it participated in the Polish Kiev offensive. After a Soviet counteroffensive, the regiment, together with other Polish units had to retreat, fighting the Russian 1st Cavalry Army of Semyon Budyonny. In August 1920, after the Battle of Warsaw, the regiment freed Drohiczyn and then Białystok, beating the Red Army in the Battle of Białystok. It then fought in the Battle of Lida, ending its participation in the war in mid-October 1920.

On December 3, 1920, Marshall Józef Piłsudski decorated the flag of the regiment with Silver Cross of the Virtuti Militari.

== Second Polish Republic ==
In the interwar period, the regiment was stationed in northeastern city of Wilno (now: Vilnius, Lithuania). Its holiday was celebrated on August 6, the anniversary of the First Cadre Company march to Congress Poland. In 1930, Polish Ministry of Military Affairs included the regiment into the Second Category, which meant that in case of armed conflict, it was to be mobilized as one of the first units. In comparison to other regiments, First Legions Infantry Regiment was stronger by app. 500 soldiers.

The flag of the regiment was handed to it by Józef Piłsudski, on November 1, 1922. It was purchased by Polish residents of the town of Meriden, Connecticut.

== 1939 Invasion of Poland ==
In late August 1939 the regiment, commanded by Colonel Kazimierz Burczak, was concentrated in forests between the Bug River and the Narew, as part of 1st Legions Infantry Division (General Wincenty Kowalski), Operational Group Wyszków.

In the night of September 4/5, 1939, the regiment marched towards Różan, where it was engaged in first clashes with the advancing Wehrmacht. On September 5–6 it defended Polish positions near Pułtusk, and then retreated towards the Bug river. On September 8 it clashed with the enemy near Wyszków. Since there was the danger of encirclement, it had to retreat towards Biała Podlaska. On September 11, after the Germans had captured Kałuszyn, 1st Legions Infantry Division was surrounded by the Germans. After two days of bloody fighting, some Polish units managed to break through. On September 13–14 the regiment fought at Stoczek, then it advanced towards Trzciniec, to open the route to southern Poland. During this advance, the regiment suffered such heavy losses that it ceased to exist as a separate unit. Elements of the unit managed to reach the area of Chełm, and participated in fighting there, to capitulate on September 22–23.

== Commandants of the Regiment ==
- Major Leopold Lis-Kula 28 II - 7 III 1919
- Major Jan Kazimierz Kruszewski 12 III - 4 VIII 1919
- Major Władysław Dragat 5 VIII 1919 - 8 III 1920
- Colonel Jan Kruszewski 8 III - 8 VII 1920
- Captain Zygmunt Wenda 16 VIII - 8 IX 1920
- Colonel Jan Kruszewski 8 IX 1920 - 14 IX 1926
- Colonel Michał Pakosz 14 IX 1926-28 III 1928
- Colonel Bolesław Krzyżanowski 28 III 1928 - 21 I 1930
- Colonel Zygmunt Wenda 21 I 1930 - 7 IV 1934
- Colonel Aleksander Stawarz 7 IV 1934 - ?
- Colonel Kazimierz Burczak ? - 20 IX 1939
- Colonel Jan Kasztelowicz 20 - 23 IX 1939

== See also ==
- 1939 Infantry Regiment (Poland)

== Sources ==
- "Księga chwały piechoty": komitet redakcyjny pod przewodnictwem płk. dypl. Bronisława Prugara Ketlinga, Departament Piechoty MSWojsk, Warszawa 1937-1939. Reprint: Wydawnictwo Bellona Warszawa 1992
