= Battle of Ostrołęka (1920) =

1920 battle of the Polish–Soviet War

- Part of Polish–Soviet War
Date	5th August 1920
Location	Ostrołęka, Masovia, Poland
Result	Soviet victory

Belligerents
Poland	Russian SFSR

Commanders and leaders
gen. Bolesław Roja, kpt. mar. A. Wąsowicz	Boris Burienin

Strength
Ostrołęka Group, 1 battalion of the Marine Regiment	18th Rifle Division

Casualties and losses
50 sailors	Unknown

The Battle of Ostrołęka took place on 2–6 August 1920, during the Polish–Soviet War. Polish forces of the 108th Uhlan Regiment (part of Ostrołęka Group under General Bolesław Roja), supported by the 1st Maritime Rifle Regiment (Captain A. Wasowicz) clashed with Red Armys 18th Rifle Division. The battle ended in Soviet victory.

On 4 July 1920 the Soviet Western Front, commanded by General Mikhail Tukhachevsky, began its offensive. Polish Army tried to halt the enemy on the line of the Niemen river, but failed to do so, and prepared another defensive line, along the Narew and the Bug river. By late July 1920, the Soviet 4th Army, together with III Cavalry Corps ("Kavkor") of Hayk Bzhishkyan advanced south of the border with East Prussia, towards Osowiec, Łomża and Ostrołęka. The Soviets were opposed by 4 000 Polish soldiers of the Narew/Ostrołęka Group.

On 2 August the Soviets attacked Łomża, capturing it in the evening of the same day. A day before, the Soviet 10th Cavalry division attacked Nowogród, defended by Polish 108th Uhlan Regiment. The battle resulted in Soviet victory, and the capture of Nowogród was of immense strategic importance, as the cavalry of Hayk Bzhishkyan crossed the Narew, and threatened the rear of Polish 1st Army, which was fighting near Zambrów. Near Sniadowo, Soviet cavalry and riflemen clashed with 4th Battalion of 4th Pomeranian Regiment. Out of 500 Polish soldiers, only 170 survived the battle: the survivors were sent to Modlin to rest.

Under the circumstances, General Roja decided to send to Łomża the group of Major Bleszynski, but its counterattack failed, and Bleszynski had to retreat to Ostrołęka. On 4 August the Soviets captured Kolno, and shelled Ostrołęka. The town was defended by the 1st Battalion of the 1st Maritime Rifle Regiment. Its commandant, Captain Wasowicz, tried to halt the invaders before Ostrołęka, hoping to gain enough time for the 4th Pomeranian Infantry Regiment to come to his aid. Due to Soviet numerical superiority, the Polish units defending Ostrołęka had to abandon the town in the night of 6-7 August, when they marched to Różan.

Altogether, sailors of the Maritime Rifle Regiment lost 53 KIA. All were buried at the parish cemetery at Rzekuń, next to the bodies of 18 uhlans, killed near Zabiel. In 1928, two monuments, one dedicated to the sailors, another to the uhlans, were unveiled.

Despite the Polish defeat, the Battle of Ostrołęka was of significant strategic importance, as it slowed the Soviet advance westwards for ten days. As a result, Polish Army Headquarters had enough time to regroup the forces and prepare the Wieprz river counterattack (see Battle of Kock (1920)).

The Battle of Ostrołęka is commemorated on the Tomb of the Unknown Soldier, Warsaw, with the inscription "OSTROLEKA 5 VIII 1920".

== See also ==
- Battle of Warsaw (1920)

== Sources ==
- J. Szczepański, Wojna polsko-bolszewicka na Mazowszu, wyd. BUWIK 1996
- J. Odziemkowski, Leksykon wojny polsko-rosyjskiej 1919–1920, wyd. RYTM Warszawa 2004.
- A. Kosecki, Wojna 1920 w Ostrołęckiem wyd. WSH w Pułtusku 1996
