= 41st Infantry Division (Poland) =

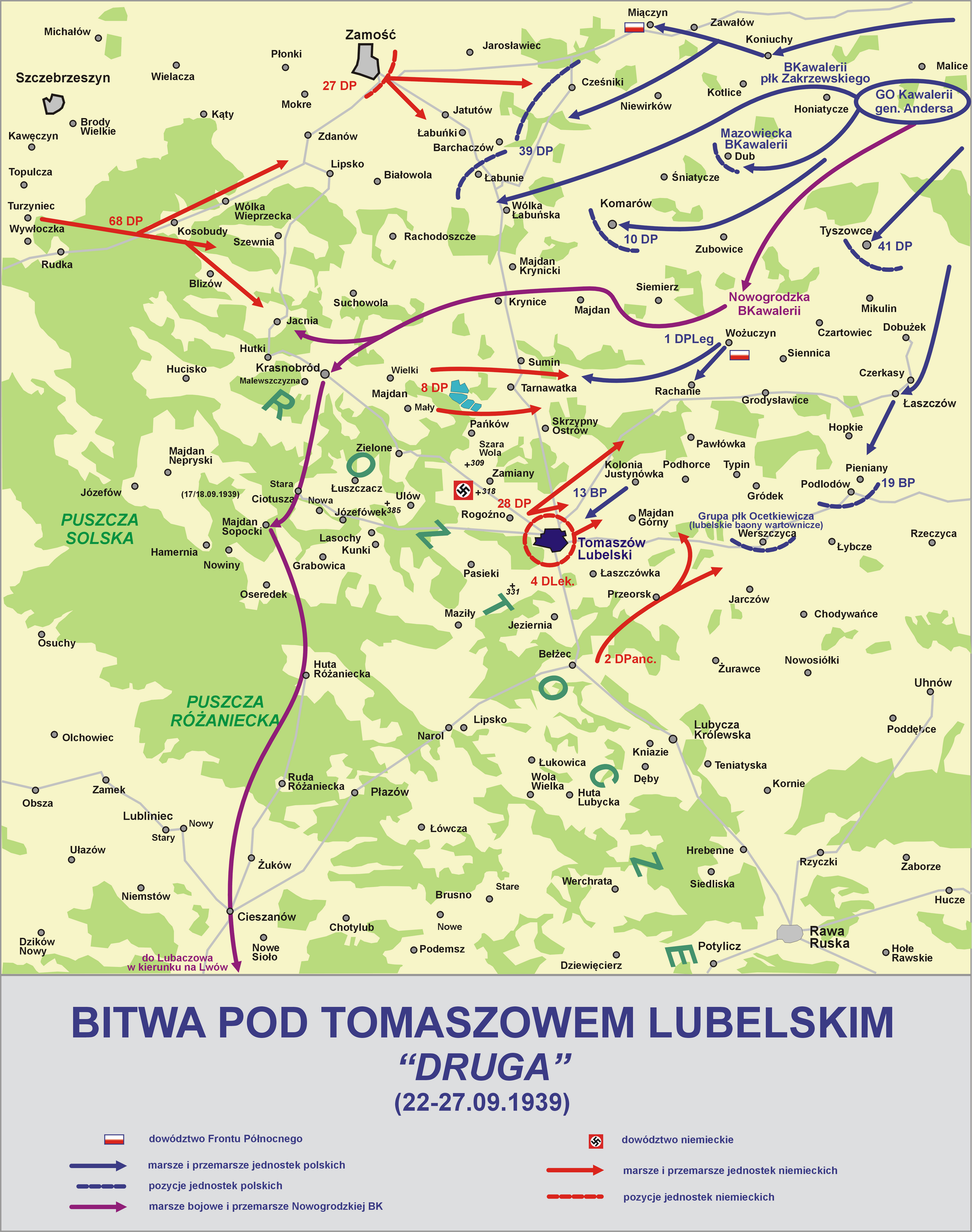
- Battle of Tomaszów Lubelski (II)
- Active: 1939
- Country: Poland
- Branch: Infantry
- Size: ca. 15,000 men
- Engagements: World War II: Battle of Różan; Battle of Wyszków; Battle of Tomaszów Lubelski

Commanders
- Notable commanders: Wacław Piekarski

The 41st (Reserve) Infantry Division (Polish: 41. Dywizja Piechoty) was a tactical unit of the Polish Army during the early stages of World War II.

During peace time the unit existed only on paper, as part of the mobilization scheme accompanying the Plan West. The division's sub-units were to be created by other peace-time regiments in case of general mobilization. Most infantry battalions were created by the NCO School of Ostrów Mazowiecka (114th and 116th Infantry Regiment) and Infantry Reserves Training Facility at Różan (most of 115th Infantry Regiment). Additional infantry and artillery battalions, as well as services were formed by 13th, 33rd and 71st Infantry Regiment, as well as the 9th Light Artillery Regiment.

The division was finally created on 24 August 1939 as part of the secret mobilization preceding the outbreak of World War II. It became part of the Commander-in-Chief's strategic reserve as part of the Corps-sized Wyszków Operational Group, along with the elite 1st Legions Infantry Division and reserve 35th Infantry Division. The core of the division was formed by seven battalions of infantry and one battalion of artillery. The remaining units (two battalions of infantry, two of artillery and services) were formed a week later, during the general mobilization. Despite difficulties, the division was battle-ready by 7 September 1939. By orders of the C-i-C the staff of the 41st Division was formed by Brigadier General Wacław Piekarski (until then the Chief of Infantry at the Ministry of Military Affairs), with Col. Marian Raganowicz as his deputy (until then the commanding officer of Infantry NCO School) and Col. Adam Sawczyński as the artillery CO.

Although not yet fully formed the fast pace of German advance during the invasion of Poland meant that the division was dispatched to the front by 4 September 1939 and took over the task of screening the area around Różan, along the Narew river. On 5 September 1939 the German "Wodrig" Corps (1st and 12th Infantry Divisions), having broken through Polish positions in the Battle of Mława, assaulted Różan directly. Despite numerical and technical superiority, the German attacks across Narew were bloodily repelled.

However, the following day the situation changed dramatically. The Commander-in-Chief ordered the division to be withdrawn towards Wyszków and attached to the Independent Operational Group Narew. Later that day the orders were reversed and the 41st was ordered to retake the town of Różan, which it had abandoned only a couple of hours before. Despite repeated attempts in the following two days, the division suffered heavy losses and was forced to withdraw. In addition, overnight of 6–7 September 1939 the retreating 41st Division met the 33rd Infantry Division. In a pitched and chaotic friendly fire that erupted, the 41st lost further two infantry battalions and one light artillery battalion. In effect, both divisions had to be withdrawn further away, towards the Bug River crossing at Brok, and any hope to stabilize the front at the Narew river was lost. As the bridge at Brok had been demolished by Polish sappers prematurely, the disorganized regiments of the 41st Division had to continue the withdrawal west towards Wyszków, losing many more men in the process. By the evening of 7 September only 7 battalions reached the destination, with roughly 35 percent of their original strength remaining.

The following day the division was attached to the Modlin Army and overnight it regrouped near Łazy, Strachów and Gwizdały. After a brief respite, the division moved to a position between Liwiec and Brok. On 10 September, while en route, the division was attacked by Panzer Division Kempf. While the German unit was severely under-strength, the pitched battle in open terrain resulted in heavy losses for the Polish unit. The defeated sub-units of the division retreated in disarray towards Włodawa and on 14 September arrived near Chełm. By this time the unit numbered only about 5000 men at arms.

Following reorganization, the division was directly attached to Gen. Stefan Dąb-Biernacki's Northern Front. On 19 September 1939 it took part in the battle of Włodawa against the German 3rd Panzer Division. It then took part in the second battle of Tomaszów Lubelski fighting near Aleksandrów and Tereszpol. Encircled by the 8th Infantry Division from the South, the VII Army Corps from the West and North, and by the advancing Red Army from the East, the division held on to its lines until 26 September 1939, when it finally capitulated.

== See also ==
- Invasion of Poland
- Polish army order of battle in 1939
- Polish contribution to World War II
- List of Polish divisions in World War II
