= Battle of Różan =

1939 Invasion of Poland battle in WWII

Coordinates: 52°53′22″N 21°23′57″E

- Part of Invasion of Poland
Date	4–6 September 1939
Location	Near Różan, Warsaw Voivodeship, Poland
Result	German victory

Belligerents
Germany	Poland

Commanders and leaders
(Nazi Germany) Georg von Küchler (Nazi Germany) Rudolf Schmidt (Nazi Germany) Werner Kempf	(Second Polish Republic) Wincenty Kowalski (Second Polish Republic) Czesław Rzedzicki

Units involved
(Nazi Germany) 3rd Army: 12th Infantry Division 1st Cavalry Brigade Panzer Division Kempf	(Second Polish Republic) Operational Group "Wyszków": 41st (Reserve) Infantry Division

Strength
30,000 men	3,300 men 15 guns

Casualties and losses
12–18 tanks (on 5 September)	20 killed 50 wounded (on September 5)

The Battle of Różan, otherwise known as defence of Różan bridgehead, took place between the 4 and 6 September 1939, in the fields before the town of Różan on the Narew River. A small Polish garrison of three World War I forts (consisting of two infantry battalions) successfully defended the bridgehead against the entire German panzer division for the entire day and night. However, as a result of a misunderstanding of the commander in chief's orders, the Polish forces were then withdrawn to the other side of the river, and then further eastwards on the 6 September.

== Background ==
On September 1, 1939, the German Wehrmacht invaded Poland, with the 3rd Army under Georg von Küchler advancing south from East Prussia with the intention of seizing a bridgehead across the Vistula. From September 1–3 the 3rd Army engaged the Polish Pomorze Army in the Battle of Mława, breaking through the Polish defenses on September 4 and forcing the surviving Polish units to fall back to the Modlin Fortress, which lay at the intersection of the Vistula and Narew rivers. General Fedor von Bock, the commander of the German Army Group North, then intervened, ordering von Küchler to cease his advance towards Modlin and instead redirect his forces towards Różan to seize a crossing of the Narew, with the ultimate intention of sweeping the 3rd Army behind the main Polish force to seize Łomża and then cross the Bug river.

Różan was defended by 3,300 troops primarily belonging to the 115th Infantry Regiment of the 41st (Reserve) Infantry Division, commanded by Col. Czesław Rzedzicki and supported by a battalion of 75mm artillery guns, all under the overall command of Operational Group Wyszków, commanded General Wincenty Kowalski.

== Battle ==
At 1000 on September 5 the German 12th Infantry Division and 1st Cavalry Brigade made contact with the Polish defenses and mounted an assault, which was repelled by accurate Polish artillery fire. Around noon, Panzer Division Kempf arrived on the battlefield, and the Germans launched another attack, supported by artillery and six Heinkel He 111 bombers. However, the Germans were again repulsed, with Polish anti-tank guns knocking out 9-12 German tanks. General Werner Kempf ordered Waffen-SS troops from Panzer Division Kempf to attempt an assault crossing of the Narew in rubber boats, but this attack was foiled by the Polish 114th Infantry Regiment. By 1800 the German forces had abandoned their attack and fallen back to their original positions.

== Aftermath ==
At the cost of 70 casualties, the Polish forces had successfully held back the advancing German forces for a full day. However, General Kowalski recognized that the severely outnumbered Polish troops were likely to be overrun by a followup assault and authorized an overnight withdrawal. The 115th Infantry Regiment attempted to destroy the bridge over the Narew, but lacked sufficient explosives to completely destroy the structure.

== See also ==
- List of World War II military equipment of Poland
- List of German military equipment of World War II
