= Battle of Modlin =

1939 battle between Nazi Germany and Polish forces

Coordinates: 52°26′18″N 20°40′55″E

- Part of Invasion of Poland
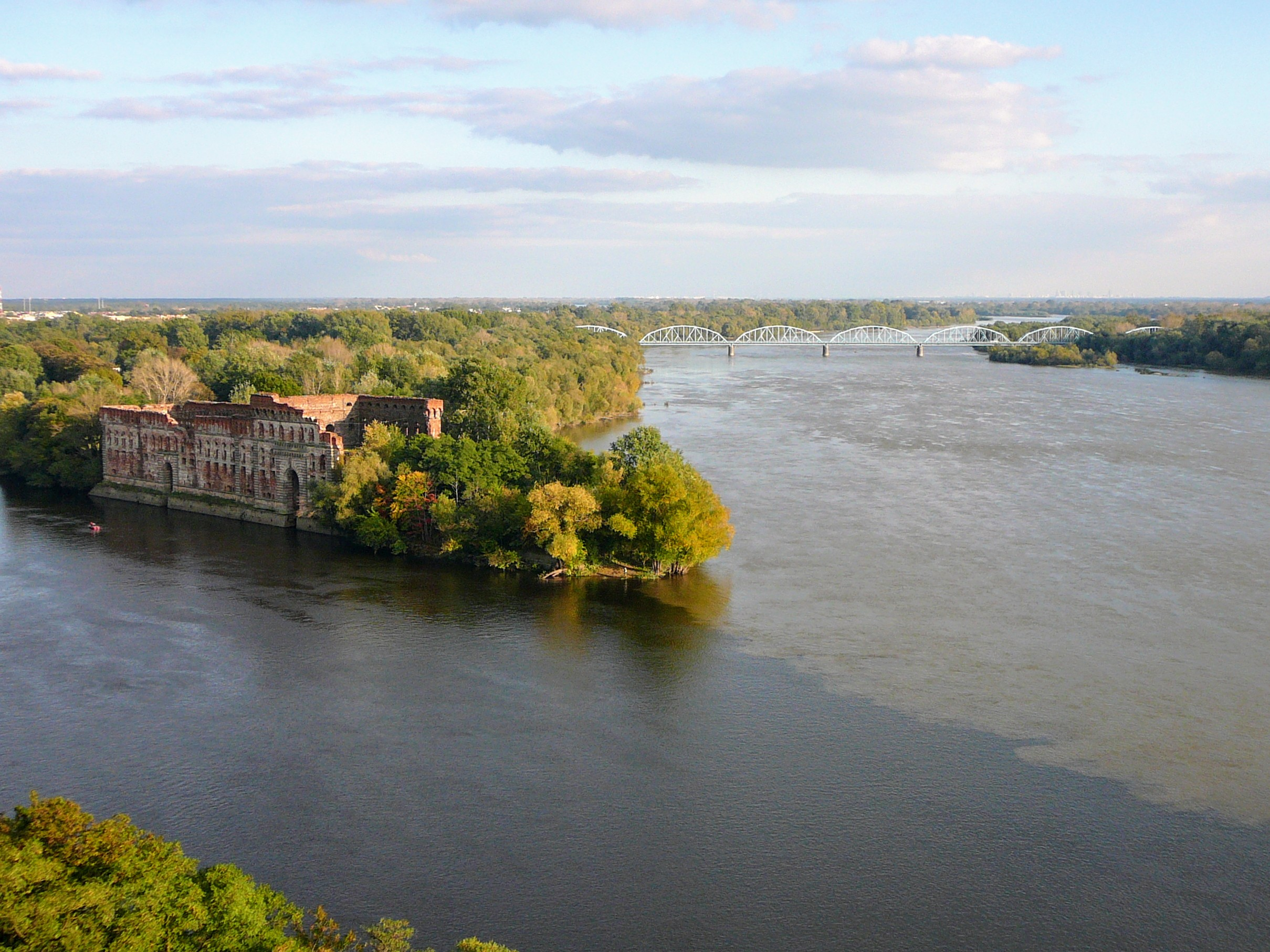
- Ruins of the southern bridgehead
Date	13–29 September 1939
Location	Modlin village, Modlin Fortress, Warsaw Voivodeship, Poland
Result	German victory

Belligerents
Germany	Poland

Commanders and leaders
(Nazi Germany) Hermann Hoth (Nazi Germany) Adolf Strauss (Nazi Germany) Werner Kempf	(Second Polish Republic) Wiktor Thommée

Units involved
German Units: (Nazi Germany) II Army Corps: Panzer Division Kempf; 32nd Infantry Division (Nazi Germany) XIV Army Corps: 29th Motorized Infantry Division (Nazi Germany) XV Army Corps: 1st Light Division; 2nd Light Division (Nazi Germany) Wehrmacht Reserves: 213th Infantry Division; 221st Infantry Division; 228th Infantry Division	Polish Units: (Second Polish Republic) Army Modlin: 8th Infantry Division; 20th Infantry Division (Second Polish Republic) Army Łódź: 2nd Legions Infantry Division; 28th Infantry Division; 30th Infantry Division

Strength
4 infantry divisions 2nd Light Division; Panzer Division Kempf; 100 aircraft	40,000 men (peak); 96 guns 7 TK-3 tankettes Armoured train "Śmierć"

Casualties and losses
900 killed 670 wounded	1,300 killed 4,000 wounded 35,000 captured

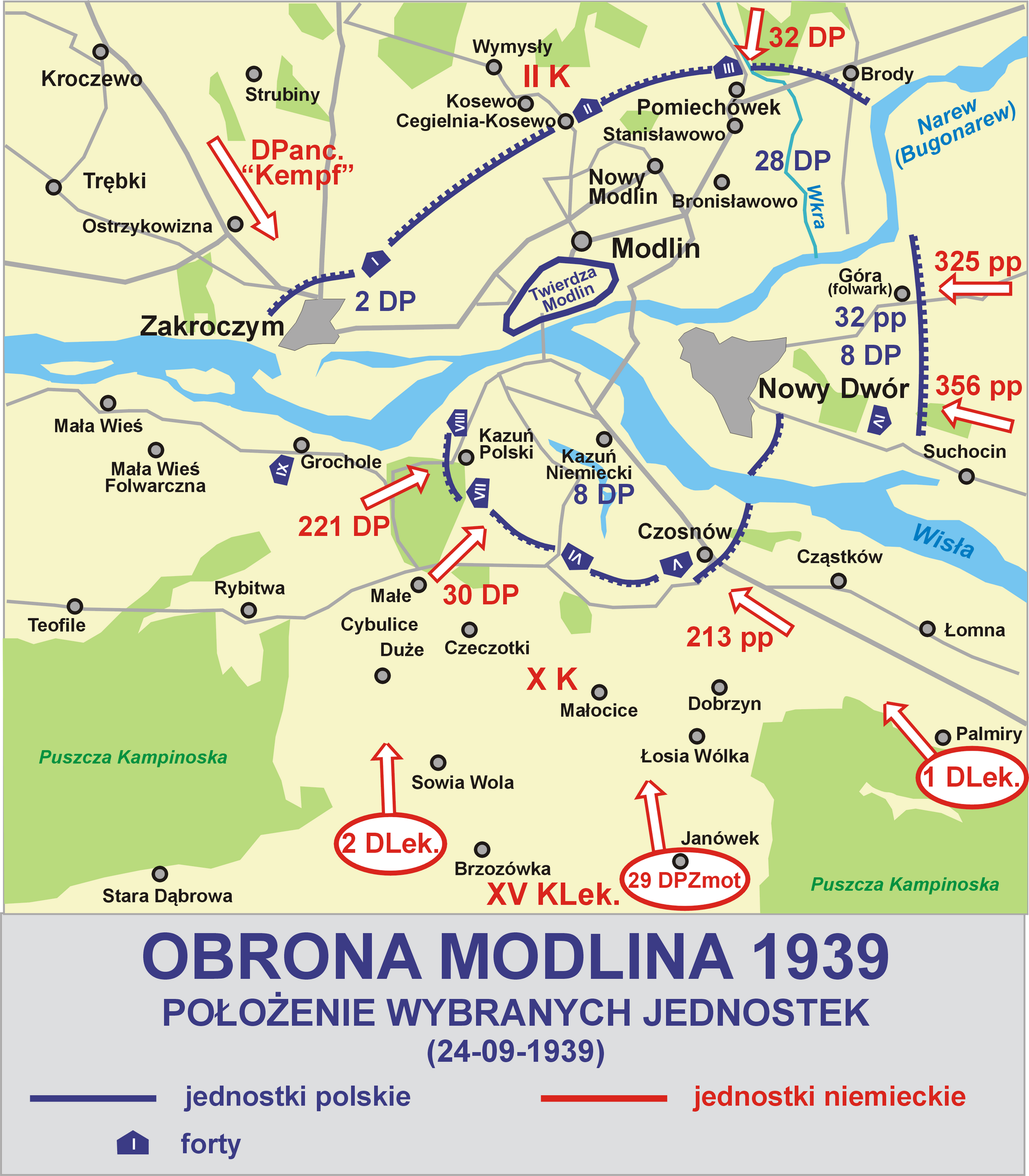
Map of the battle by Lonio17

The Battle of Modlin took place during the 1939 German invasion of Poland at the beginning of the Second World War. Modlin Fortress was initially the headquarters of the Modlin Army until its retreat eastwards. From 13 to 29 September 1939, it served as a defensive citadel for Polish forces under the command of General Wiktor Thommée against assaulting German units. The fighting was closely linked with the strategic situation of the Battle of Warsaw.

The Polish forces defending the fortress included the armoured train Śmierć ("death") and the Modlin anti-aircraft battery, which was credited with shooting down more Luftwaffe planes than any other in the entire September campaign.

Fortress Modlin capitulated on 29 September, one of the last to lay down its arms in the campaign, and surrendered 24,000 troops. Several days earlier, Rochus Misch had attempted to negotiate the surrender of the fortress and was shot and badly wounded while returning from the negotiations, for which he was awarded the Iron Cross.

Soldiers of the Panzer Division Kempf committed the Massacre in Zakroczym on 28 September 1939.

== See also ==
- List of World War II military equipment of Poland
- List of German military equipment of World War II
