= Wacław Piekarski =

Polish brigadier general (1893–1979)

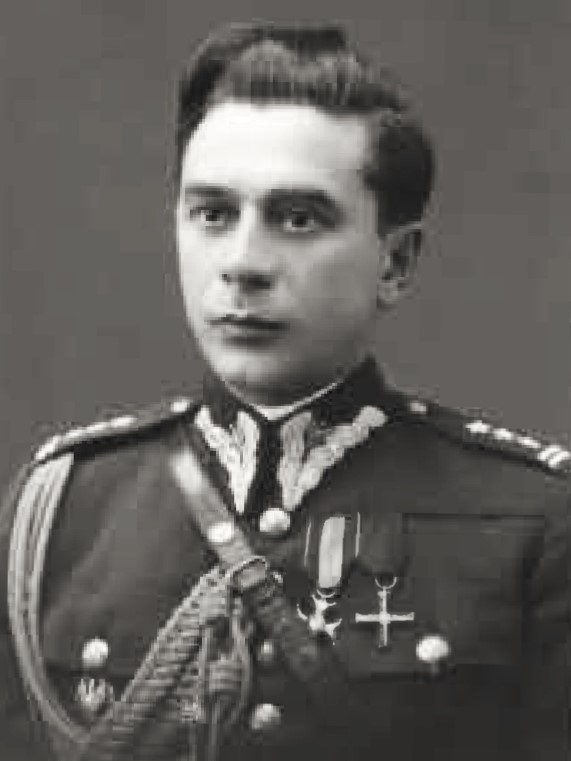
Wacław Piekarski - 1934

Wacław Piekarski (1893–1979) was a Polish military officer and a general (generał brygady) of the Polish Army. He fought in World War I in the ranks of various Polish formations. During the Invasion of Poland and the opening stages of World War II he was the commanding officer of Polish 41st Infantry Division. After the war he remained in exile and served as the head of the house for the elderly of the Polish Humanitarian Fund in Lailly-en-Val.

Wacław Piekarski was born 5 June 1893 in Pilica, then in Russian-held part of Poland. Following the outbreak of World War I he defected to Austro-Hungarian Galicia and joined the Polish Legions. In 1918 he was accepted into the Polish Army and attached to the 36th 'Academic Legion' Infantry Regiment. Between 1922 and 1924 he studied at the École Supérieure de Guerre in France. During that time, on 3 May 1922 he was promoted to the rank of lieutenant colonel.

In January 1925 Piekarski was attached to the Polish General Staff as part of the Division II (Polish intelligence and counter-espionage service) as head of Section 2. In 1926 however he was moved to the Office of General Inspector of the Armed Forces and became the 1st Staff Officer of Gen. Jan Romer. Following this brief staff practice, the following year he became the commanding officer of the 54th 'Kresy Rifles' Infantry Regiment in Tarnopol (modern Ternopil, Ukraine). Promoted to full colonel on 1 January 1928, in 1931 he joined the Border Defence Corps and became the commanding officer of its 4th Brigade based in Czortków (modern Chortkiv, Ukraine).

In October 1935 Wacław Piekarski became the Divisional Infantry Commander (de facto deputy commander) of the 11th 'Carpathian' Infantry Division stationed around Stanisławów (modern Ivano-Frankivsk, Ukraine). A year later, in October 1936 he became the CO of 29th Infantry Division based in Grodno (modern Hrodna, Belarus). After two years serving in that capacity, in October 1938 he was recalled to Warsaw and became the chief of Department of Infantry in the Ministry of Military Affairs. On 19 March 1939 he was promoted to the rank of brigadier general.

During the Nazi and Soviet Invasion of Poland of 1939 Piekarski commanded the reserve 41st Infantry Division, and then an improvised division composed of remnants of his unit and the 33rd Infantry Division. Despite heavy losses, Piekarski's unit-maintained cohesion until the very end of the campaign. He capitulated with his forces on 26 September 1939 and spent the rest of the war in German captivity in Oflag VIII-E Johannisbrunn and Oflag VII-A Murnau. After the war, unable to return to Soviet-held Poland, he stayed in exile in France. He served as a long-time head of the Rest House of the Polish Humanitarian Fund, a palace in Lailly-en-Val for veterans of Polish forces living abroad. He died 14 February 1979 in Créteil.
