= Zakroczym =

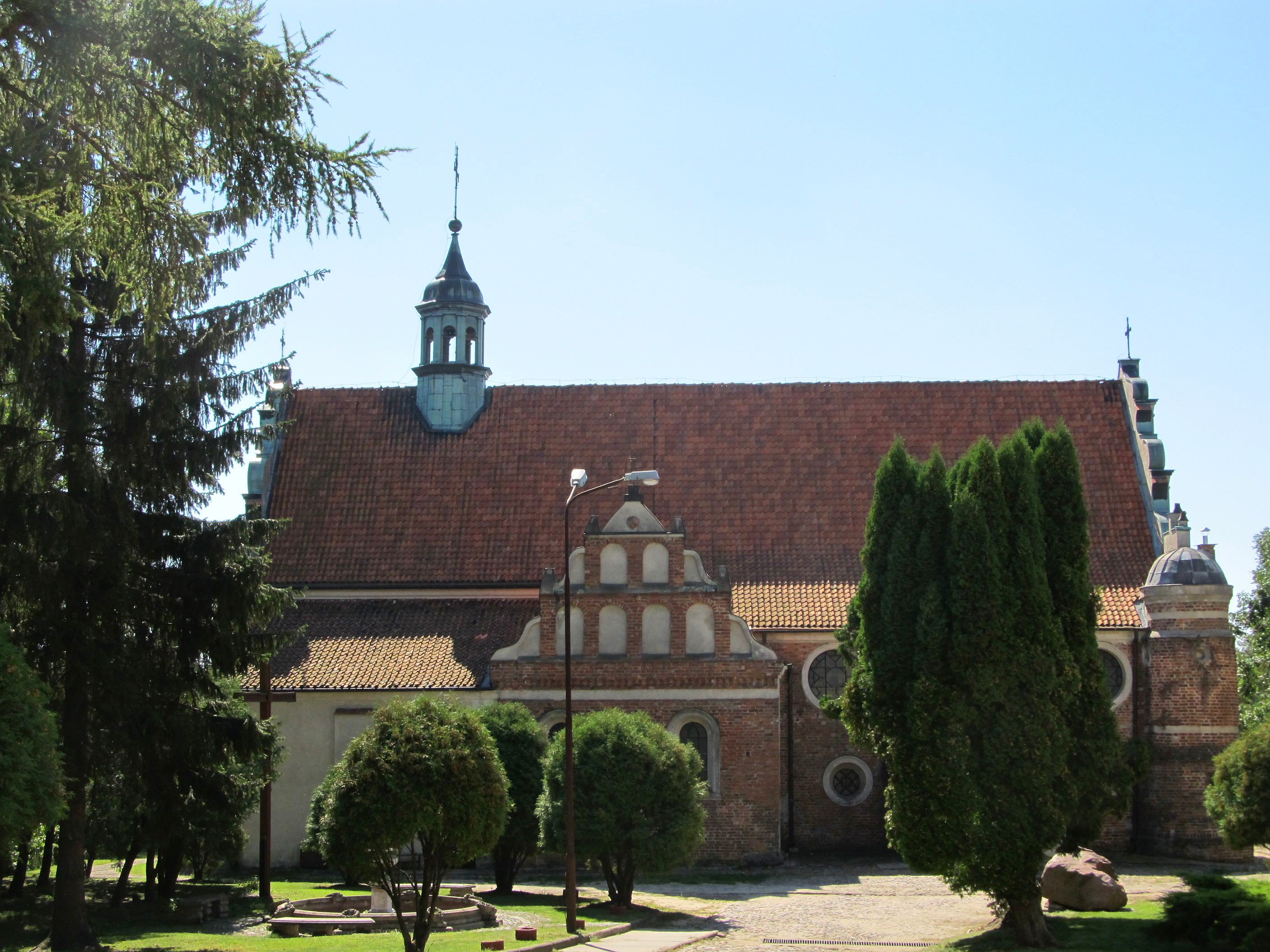
- Church of the Exaltation of the Holy Cross

- Flag Coat of arms

- Location within Poland
- Coordinates: 52°26′16″N 20°36′43″E
- Country: Poland
- Voivodeship: Masovian
- County: Nowy Dwór
- Gmina: Zakroczym
- Established: 11th century
- Town rights: 1422

Government
  - Mayor: Artur Ciecierski

Area
  - Total: 19.97 km^{2} (7.71 sq mi)
- Elevation: 67 m (220 ft)

Population (2006)
  - Total: 3,367
  - Density: 168.6/km^{2} (436.7/sq mi)
- Time zone: UTC+1 (CET)
  - Summer (DST): UTC+2 (CEST)
- Postal code: 05-170
- Area code: +48 22
- Car plates: WND
- Primary airport: Warsaw Modlin Airport
- Website: http://www.zakroczym.pl

Zakroczym ([zaˈkrɔt͡ʂɨm]; Yiddish: זאקראטשין Zakrotshin) is a town in the Masovian Voivodeship, Poland. The Vistula River flows through the town. Zakroczym has a long and rich history: in the Kingdom of Poland and the Polish–Lithuanian Commonwealth, it was the capital of an administrative unit (ziemia), part of Mazovian Voivodeship. Also, Zakroczym was a royal town of the Crown of the Kingdom of Poland.

== Name ==
The name of Zakroczym comes from ancient Polish word zakrot, which means river crossing. Originally, the town was located closer to the Vistula river, and was called Kroczym or Kroczyn. Due to numerous floods, Zakroczym was moved to a higher location.

== History ==
- c. 1155 – first mention of the gord and settlement of Zakroczym, property of Benedictine Monastery from Mogilno,
- 8 June 1335 – Mazovian dukes Siemowit II and Trojden I renew here truce with Grand Master of the Teutonic Knights, Dietrich von Altenburg,
- 1374 – Zakroczym becomes capital of a land, part of Masovian Voivodeship, and remains so until 1795,
- 1422 – Duke of Mazovia Janusz I of Warsaw grant town charter to Zakroczym,
- 1656–1657 – Zakroczym is occupied by Swedish forces (see Swedish invasion of Poland). The town is partially destroyed,
- 1709 – Zakroczym is burned by Swedish troops during the Great Northern War,
- 1757 – construction of a monastery Order of Friars Minor Capuchin begins,
- 1793 – the town is seized by the Russians,
- 1795 – Zakroczym becomes part of the Kingdom of Prussia in the Third Partition of Poland,
- 1806 – French forces cross the Vistula near Zakroczym, before the Battle of Pułtusk,
- 1807 – Zakroczym becomes part of the Polish Duchy of Warsaw,
- 1815 – Zakroczym becomes part of Congress Poland,
- 1831 – after Russian capture of Warsaw, meetings of Polish government and Sejm take place at the monastery,
- 1883–1888 – construction of Fort 1 Zakroczym, first ring of fortifications of the Modlin Fortress,
- 20 August 1915 – Russian garrison of the fortress capitulates to Germans,
- 1918 – Poland regains independence after World War I, Zakroczym restored to Poland,
- 10–28 September 1939 – Battle of Modlin between Poland and Germany during the German-Soviet invasion of Poland, which started World War II,
- 28 September 1939 – Massacre in Zakroczym, Wehrmacht soldiers kill around 600 Polish civilians and prisoners of war by firing squad,
- December 1939 – local Polish parish priest Antoni Więckowski deported by the Germans to the Soldau concentration camp and murdered there,
- January 1940 – 40 Poles from Zakroczym, including pre-way mayor Tadeusz Henzlich, murdered by the Germans in the Palmiry massacre,
- November 1941 – Last remaining Jews deported by the German Nazis to the ghetto at Nowy Dwór Mazowiecki,
- 1944 – Germans create a transit camp for 30,000 residents of Warsaw, deported from the city after the Warsaw Uprising,
- 1945 – end of German occupation and World War II, as a result of which 78% of the town is destroyed.

== Sights ==
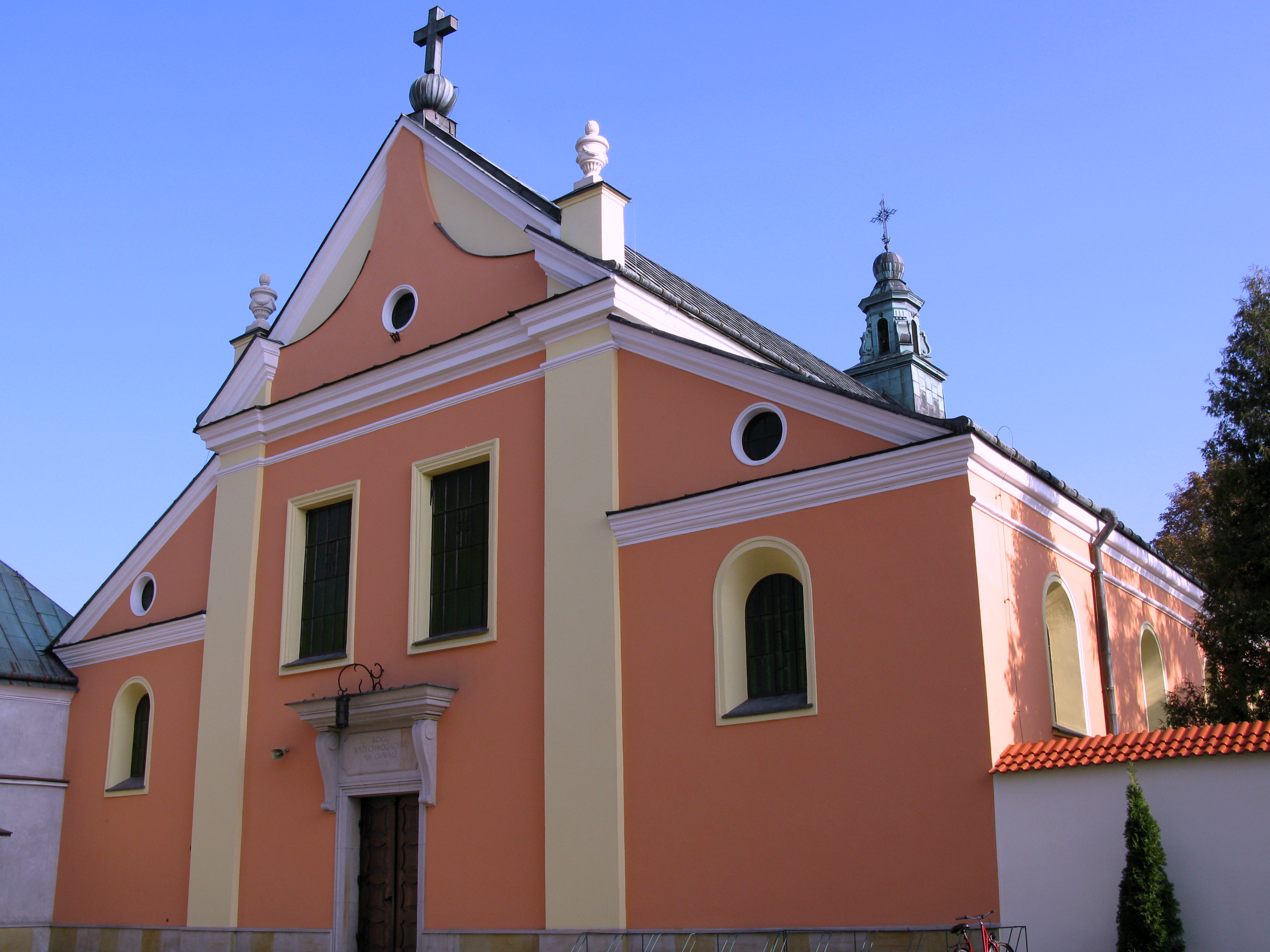
Baroque Saint Lawrence church

- Gothic-Renaissance Church of the Exaltation of the Holy Cross (15th or 16th century), rebuilt after World War II in 1949. In its northern and southern walls there are Swedish cannonballs,
- Baroque Capuchin monastery and church of Saint Lawrence,
- a monument dedicated to insurgents of 1830 and 1863, and to victims of the war,
- castle hill, with a 19th-century manor house, built on 15th-century foundations. Original manor house was built before 1422 by Mazovian dukes,
- traces of an 11th-century gord, located northeast of town, on a high bank of the Vistula. The gord, first mentioned in 1065, was burned in late 13th century, and later rebuilt.
- Fort Nr. 1 Zakroczym (1883–1888).

== Transport ==
The Expressway S7 and National road 62 run to the north of the town, and the Warsaw Modlin Airport is located just east of the town.

== Cuisine ==
The Zakroczym area is one of the places of cherry cultivation in Poland, which is one of the world's main cherry producers. Cherry products such as podchmielone wisienki zakroczymskie (cherries covered with syrup and spirit) and konfitura wiśniowa zakroczymska (a local type of traditional Polish cherry jam) are officially protected traditional foods of Zakroczym, as designated by the Ministry of Agriculture and Rural Development of Poland.
