= Oflag VIII-E Johannisbrunn =

World War II German prisoner-of-war camp

Oflag VIII-E
- Jánské Koupele, German-occupied Czechoslovakia (now Czech Republic)
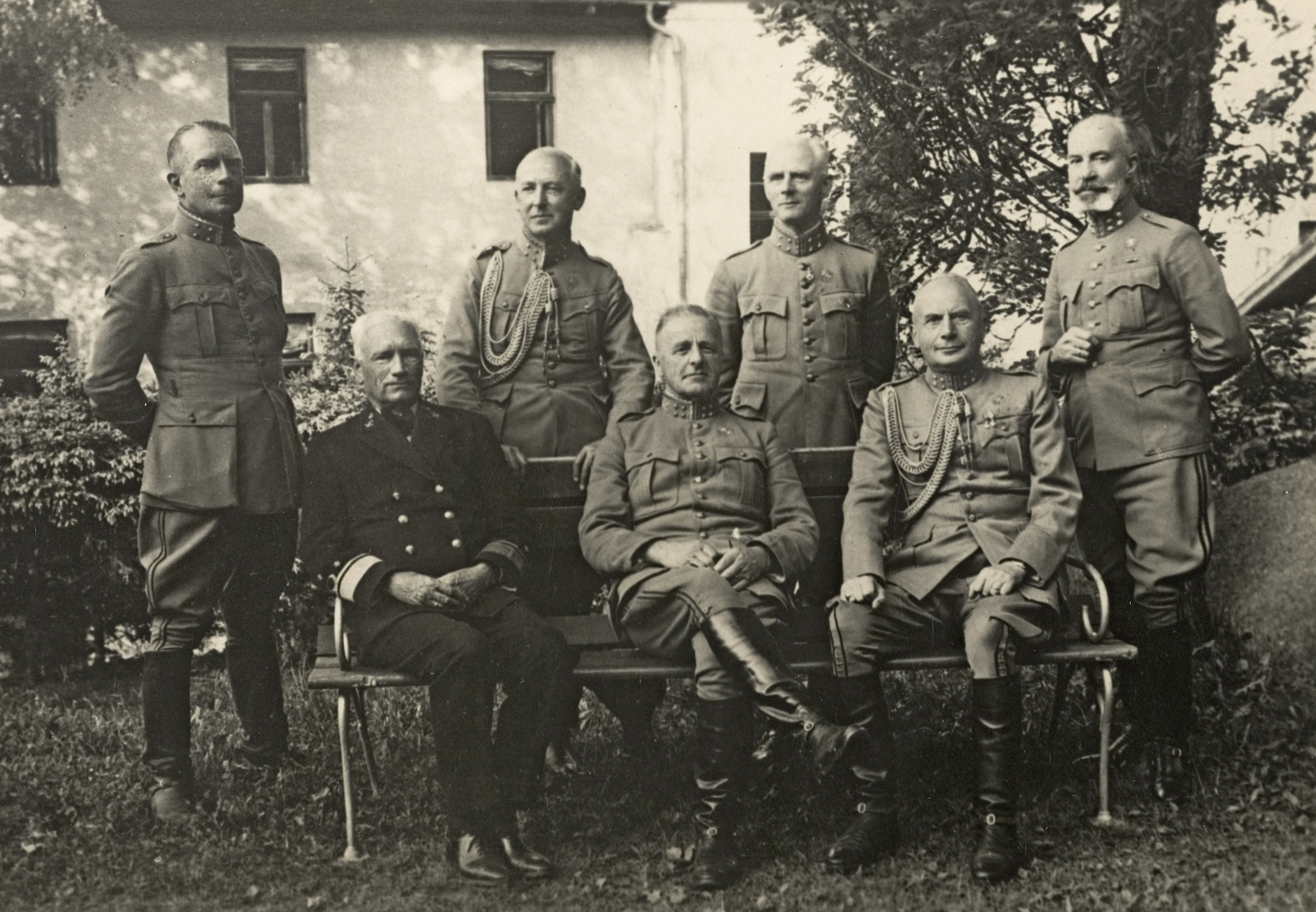
- Senior Dutch officers in 1941 during their captivity in Oflag VIII-E

Site information
- Type: Prisoner-of-war camp
- Controlled by: Nazi Germany

Location
- Jánské Koupele, Czech Republic
- Location within Czech Republic
- Coordinates: 49.83524°N 17.70425°E

Site history
- In use: 1940–1942
- Battles/wars: World War II

Garrison information
- Occupants: Predominantly Polish and French general officers, plus other Allied general officers

Oflag VIII-E was a World War II German prisoner-of-war camp for Allied general officers (Offizierlager) located in Jánské Koupele (then Johannisbrunn) in German-occupied Czechoslovakia (now located in the Moravian–Silesian Region, Czech Republic).

== Camp history ==
The camp, a former spa hotel, was opened in July 1940 and housed approximately 70 Allied generals and their aides. Among those officers imprisoned were 30 from Poland, 24 from France, 7 from the Netherlands, 6 from Belgium, 1 from the United Kingdom, and a Colonel from Norway. On April 27, 1942, all the Poles were transferred to other camps, mostly to Oflag VII-A Murnau. Soon after all the other prisoners were also transferred, and the camp was closed on 1 July 1942.

=== Commandants ===
- Oberst Hencker (29 October 1940 – 30 June 1941)
- Generalmajor Johann Janusz (1 July 1941 – 19 May 1942)

== Notable prisoners ==
A number of high-ranking officers were held in the camp, including:

Polish

Generał dywizji

- Władysław Bortnowski
- Tadeusz Kutrzeba
- Juliusz Rómmel

Generał brygady

- Roman Abraham
- Franciszek Alter
- Władysław Boncza-Uzdowski
- Leopold Cehak
- Jan Chmurowicz
- Walerian Czuma
- Franciszek Dindorf-Ankowicz
- Juliusz Drapella
- Janusz Gąsiorowski
- Edmund Knoll-Kownacki
- Wincenty Kowalski
- Józef Kwaciszewski
- Stanislaw Malachowski
- Czesław Młot-Fijałkowski
- Zygmunt Piasecki
- Wacław Piekarski
- Zygmunt Podhorski
- Zdzislaw Przyjalkowski
- Jan Jagmin-Sadowski
- Stanisław Taczak
- Wiktor Thommée
- Juliusz Zulauf

Kontradmirał

- Józef Unrug

British

- Brigadier Nigel FitzRoy Somerset (145th Infantry Brigade)

Dutch

- General Henri Gerard Winkelman, Commander-in-Chief Dutch Forces 1940

== See also ==
- List of prisoner-of-war camps in Germany
