= Czesław Młot-Fijałkowski =

Polish military officer (1892–1944)

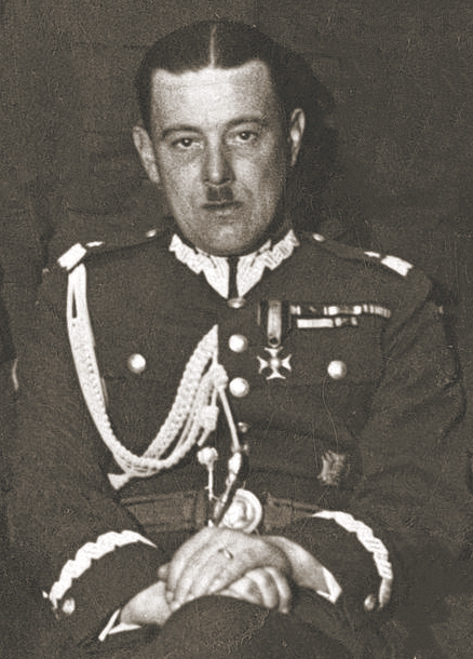
- Born: 14 April 1892; Okalewo, Austro-Hungary
- Died: 17 April 1944 (aged 52) Murnau am Staffelsee, Nazi Germany
- Allegiance: Austro-Hungary; Second Polish Republic
- Branch: Austro-Hungarian Army; Polish Legions; Polish Armed Forces
- Service years: 1914–1944
- Conflicts: World War I World War II

Czesław Młot-Fijałkowski (1892–1944) was a Polish military officer and a brigadier general of the Polish Army.

Czesław Fijałkowski was born on 14 April 1892 in Okalewo (now in Rypin County), in the Płock Governorate of Congress Poland, then part of the Russian Empire. In 1912 he graduated from a trade school in Skierniewice and left Congress Poland for Liège, where he joined the University of Liège. There he joined the Polish Rifle Squads organization and became the head of its local branch in Belgium. Following the outbreak of World War I he returned to Poland and joined the Polish Legions already in August 1914. He served on the front, commanding a platoon, a company and eventually a battalion of the 5th Legions' Infantry Regiment. Around that time he earned the nickname of Młot (Polish for Hammer), which afterwards became part of his surname. Following the Oath crisis of 1917 he was interned in Beniaminów, but was released in May 1918 and was allowed to join the Polnische Wehrmacht, at the same time secretly cooperating with the Polish Military Organization.

Already in November 1918 he joined the reborn Polish Army in the rank of Kapitan and took part in the defence of Cieszyn Silesia against the Czechoslovak invasion and later in the Polish–Ukrainian War. Verified in the rank of major, in 1920 he was promoted to the rank of lieutenant colonel. After almost a year of staff duties during the Polish–Soviet War, in late 1920 he became the commanding officer of the Pułtusk-based 13th Infantry Regiment and then in 1923 promoted to the rank of colonel. A skilled peacetime commander, he held command posts in the Polish 26th Infantry Division (deputy CO; 1926–1928) and then Polish 7th Infantry Division (1928–1929). In 1930 he was again promoted, this time to the rank of brigadier general, and assigned to the Łomża-based Polish 18th Infantry Division, which he commanded until the end of the interbellum.

In 1939, during the mobilization for the War with Germany, he was named the CO of the newly formed Narew Operational Group, a Corps-sized unit that was to defend the Polish border between the Narew river and the border with Lithuania, along the Biebrza river line. With two cavalry brigades and two infantry divisions (11th and 33rd) under his command, Młot-Fijałkowski ordered his units to probe the enemy and reconnaissance the enemy territory. Thus his unit became the only Polish detachment to cross into Germany during the Polish Defensive War. However, the Modlin Army stationed to the west of his troops was forced to steadily withdraw southwards, and on 7 September 1939 Młot-Fijałkowski's unit was ordered the same. However, by that time the Guderian Corps managed to defeat the Polish 18th Infantry Division and outflank the Polish unit, which had to break through with significant losses on both sides. In the effect only the cavalry brigades survived and were commanded from then on by Gen. Zygmunt Podhorski, while Młot-Fijałkowski became a member of his staff.

Together with Podhorski's improvised unit Młot-Fijałkowski reached Białowieża on 20 September, where a new cavalry division Zaza was being formed. Immediately it started a fast march southwards in order to link up with other Polish units fighting in the area of Lublin and Tomaszów Lubelski. On 29 September it finally reached the Wieprz River area, where it became a part of Gen. Franciszek Kleeberg's Independent Operational Group Polesie. With that unit Czesław Młot-Fijałkowski took part in the battle of Kock, the last major engagement of the Polish campaign.

Taken prisoner of war by the Germans, Młot-Fijałkowski spent the rest of the war in various German POW camps. Among them were the Oflag IV-B Koenigstein and Oflag VII-A Murnau, where he died on 17 April 1944.

== Honours and awards ==
- Silver Cross of the Virtuti Militari
- Commander's Cross of the Order of Polonia Restituta, previously awarded the Officer's Cross
- Cross of Independence
- Cross of Valour - four times
- Gold Cross of Merit

== Notes and references ==
General:

1. Artur Kuprianis (2004). Generał brygady Czesław Młot-Fijałkowski (1892-1944) (in Polish). Warsaw: Trio. p. 304. ISBN 83-88542-82-6.
2. Zbigniew R. Muszyński (January 2001). "Młot-Fijałkowski Czesław (1892-1944)". Gazeta Wyborcza (in Polish) (2001–08–05). Archived from the original on 2007-06-30.
