= 33rd Infantry Division (Poland) =

The 33rd Infantry Division was a reserve infantry division of the Polish Army in the final days of the Second Polish Republic. It was not part of peacetime structure of the army, and was formed on August 24–27, 1939, out of units stationed at military districts I (Warsaw) and III (Grodno). It consisted mainly of Border Protection Corps battalions, together with students of Central Border Protection Corps Officer School (Osowiec) and 32nd Light Artillery from Rembertów.

According to the operational plan of the Polish Army, the Division, commanded by Colonel Tadeusz Zieleniewski became part of Independent Operational Group Narew, as a reserve unit. In late August 1939, it concentrated in Czerwony Bór, and was tasked with defending the area of Ostrołęka, Łomża and Nowogród. One of divisional units was sent to Osowiec Fortress.

In the first three days of the Invasion of Poland, the division had limited contact with the enemy. On September 5, it was ordered to attack the 3rd Army (Wehrmacht). On the next day, it marched to its concentration point, north of Wyszków. In the night of September 6/7, 1939, the division, together with other units of the Wyszków Group, attacked the town of Różan, in order to hold Polish positions along the Narew river. The Wehrmacht responded with its panzers along a wide front, which resulted in a general Polish retreat. Subunits of the division began to flee in panic, mixing with the 41st Infantry Division, which also retreated. Polish losses were high, furthermore, Colonel Zieleniewski was unable to find General Wacław Piekarski, commandant of the 41st Division.

On September 7, five battalions of the 33rd Division reached Wyszków. On the next day, remnants of the Division were attached to Modlin Army. On September 10, the Division, while on the march, was attacked by tanks of Panzer Division Kempf. After another retreat, the Division regrouped in the village of Piszczac, where it rested for two days, and received new equipment from military magazines at Biała Podlaska.

In the night of September 14/15, General Mieczyslaw Rys-Trojanowski, who at that time stayed at Kowel, ordered the Division to march to Brzesc nad Bugiem, in order to reinforce the garrison of the Brest Fortress. Even though General Rys-Trojanowski was not in the position to dispose of units of Modlin Army, Colonel Zieleniewski obeyed the order, and in the morning of September 15 commanded his soldiers to march to Brzesc. Soon afterwards, however, General Emil Krukowicz-Przedrzymirski came to Piszczac, and ordered Zieleniewski to march to Włodawa. On September 17, the Division took part in a skirmish near Włodawa, after which it joined Northern Front of General Stefan Dąb-Biernacki, and marched southwards.

On September 19 at the village of Majdan Ostrowski, General Krukowicz-Przedrzymirski reorganized his forces, merging the remnants of the 33rd I.D. with the remnants of the 41st I.D. The new unit, with 6000 soldiers and 35 cannons, was named the 41st I.D., was commanded by General Wacław Piekarski.

== Sources ==
- Tadeusz Jurga, Władysław Karbowski, Armia „Modlin" 1939, Wydawnictwo Ministerstwa Obrony Narodowej, Warszawa 1987, ISBN 83-11-07274-4.

== See also ==
- Polish army order of battle in 1939
- Polish contribution to World War II
