= Wiktor Thommée =

Polish general (1881–1962)

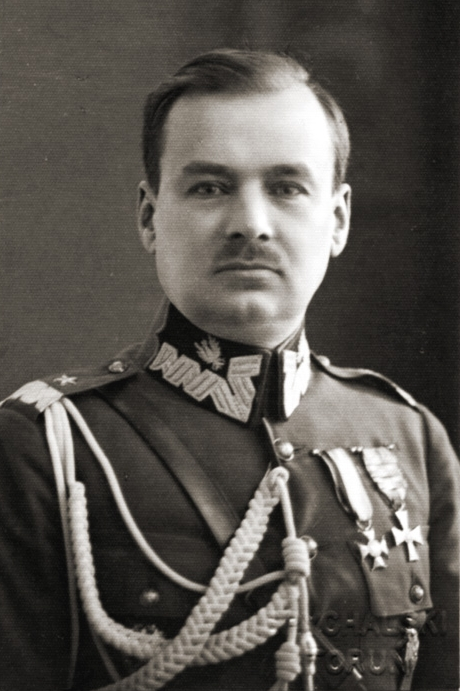
- Born: 30 December 1881; Sventiany, Russian Empire
- Died: 12 September 1962 (aged 80) Warsaw, Poland
- Allegiance: Poland
- Branch: Polish Army
- Service years: from 1901
- Rank: generał brygady
- Conflicts: Russo-Japanese War; World War I; Russian Civil War; Polish–Soviet War; World War II; Invasion of Poland
- Awards: Virtuti Militari Golden Cross Virtuti Militari Silver Medal Polonia Restituta Commander's Cross Golden Krzyż Zasługi Krzyz Walecznych, 4 times Medal of Independence

Wiktor Thommée (1881–1962) was a Polish military commander and a brigadier general of the Polish Army. A veteran of the Great War and the Russian Civil War, he is best known for his command over Piotrków Operational Group and the battle of the Bzura during the Invasion of Poland of 1939.

== Early life ==
Wiktor Thommée was born 30 December 1881 in Sventiany, Russian Empire (modern Švenčionys, Lithuania), to a Polish family of distant French provenance. After graduating from trade schools in Lida and Dyneburg (modern Daugavpils, Latvia), in 1901 he joined an officers' school in St. Petersburg. In 1904 he graduated and received the grade of second lieutenant, after which he was attached to the Voronezh-based 124th Infantry Regiment. With that unit he took part in the Russo-Japanese War of 1904–1905. Twice wounded, he spent several months in various hospitals, after which he was dismissed from active service for recovery and joined the Trade Institute in Kharkov (modern Kharkiv, Ukraine). In 1912 he was again admitted to the Russian Army and until 1914 he studied at the Academy of the General Staff in St. Petersburg.

== First World War ==
After the outbreak of the Great War, Thommée joined the 276th Infantry Regiment and served with distinction as a commanding officer of a company and then battalion. In 1916 he was promoted to the rank of lieutenant colonel and became an adjutant at the staff of the 48th Corps in the area of the Romanian front. After the Russian Revolution of 1917, he quit the army and on 25 September 1918 he joined the Polish Army in the area of Kuban. There, on 9 November he became the de facto chief of staff of Lucjan Żeligowski's Polish 4th Rifle Division, formally a part of the Polish Blue Army allied to France, United Kingdom, U.S. and Imperial Russia. After the division returned to Poland and was reformed into the 10th Infantry Division, Thommée served as the chief of its staff during the opening stages of the Polish-Bolshevik War until August 1919. On 22 August that year he became the head of the Third department of the staff (Offensive intelligence "B"), controlling the intelligence net in the European part of Russia, at the North-Western Front, Masovian Front and then the Polish 1st Army under Gen. Franciszek Latinik.

A skilled officer of intelligence service, Thommée asked his superiors to move him to front-line service and on 17 June 1920 he was made the commanding officer of the famous 28th Kaniów Rifles Infantry Regiment. For the rest of the Polish-Bolshevik War, he commanded the 19th Infantry and then 20th Infantry Brigades. For his service during the conflict, in 1922 he was promoted to the rank of colonel (with precedence of 1 June 1919).

After the Peace of Riga had been signed, Thommée remained in the army and on 10 August 1921 he was made the commanding officer of the General Army Area Brześć. On 20 October 1922 he became the first officer of the Grodno-based 3rd Military Area Command (DOK III) and at the same time he started his studies at the Higher War School in Warsaw. On 1 July 1923 he was promoted to the rank of brigadier general, and on 15 August 1924 he became the commanding officer of the 15th Infantry Division stationed in Bydgoszcz. One of the most promising staff officers of his times, in 1926 he was sent to Paris, where he graduated from the prestigious Ecole Superieure de Guerre. Upon his return to Poland, he continued his service at various posts, including the command over the Toruń-based 8th Military Area Command (DOK VIII; 1934–1938) and then the Łódź-based 4th Military Area Command (DOK IV).

== Second World War ==
At the outbreak of the Invasion of Poland, on 1 September 1939, Thommée assumed the command over the Piotrków Operational Group, one of Polish Army Corps within the Łódź Army. Renamed to Thommée Operational Group on 6 September, the unit was the only part of the Łódź Army not to suffer tremendous losses during the retreat from the borders. After Gen. Juliusz Rómmel left his army for Warsaw, Wiktor Thommée managed to reorganise the withdrawing forces of the Łódź Army and fight the battle of Cyrusowa Wola on 8 September, in which he defeated the German 10th Infantry Division. After the battle, on 13 September his forces moved to the Modlin Fortress, where Thommée assumed the command of the Modlin Army. Besieged, the forces under his command defended the area until 29 September. Due to lack of supplies, food and water, Gen. Thommée negotiated the capitulation of his forces under the condition that all the soldiers were to be treated as prisoners of war and were to be set free.

Although initially the Germans honoured the treaty, on 7 November 1939, Thommée was arrested along with a large part of his staff and was sent to Germany. He spent the remaining part of World War II in various German prisoner-of-war camps. Initially in Oflag IV-B Koenigstein and Stalag I-B Hohenstein, he was transferred to Oflag VIII-E Johannisbrunn. In 1942 he was sent to Oflag VII-A Murnau, from where he undertook numerous escape attempts and was finally sent to Oflag VI-B Dössel.

Liberated in 1945, he moved to the United Kingdom, where in April he joined the Polish Armed Forces in the West. Unlike most of his war-time colleagues, in January 1947 he returned to communist Poland. Formally accepted into the army, he was retired and deprived of his pension. He lived in poverty in Gdynia, at times working as a janitor. It was not until the death of Bolesław Bierut and the political thaw of 1956 that Wiktor Thommée was granted with a pension and a flat in Warsaw.

He died on 12 September 1962 and was buried in the Alley of the Meritorious in Warsaw's Powązki Military Cemetery. On 1 January 1964 he was posthumously promoted to the rank of division general (Lt. Gen.).

== Awards ==
Throughout his life, Thommée was awarded with some of the highest Polish military decorations. Among them were:

- Virtuti Militari (5th and 4th classes)
- Commanders' Cross of the Order of Polonia Restituta
- Cross of Valour (Krzyż Walecznych), 4 times
- Gold Cross of Merit (Krzyż Zasługi)
- Independence Medal
