= Army Detachment Kempf =

- German: Armeeabteilung Kempf
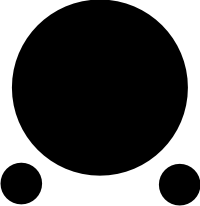
- Unit marking
- Active: 1 February 1943 – 22 August 1943
- Country: Nazi Germany
- Branch: Heer ( Wehrmacht)
- Engagements: Battle of Kursk

Commanders
- Notable commanders: Werner Kempf

Army Detachment Kempf (German: Armeeabteilung Kempf) was an army-sized formation of the Wehrmacht on the Eastern Front during World War II. As part of Army Group South, Detachment Kempf saw action during Operation Citadel, the German attempt to cut off the Kursk salient and destroy a large part of the Soviet Army.

== Operational history ==
The detachment was formed on 1 February 1943 as Armee-Abteilung Lanz, led by Hubert Lanz. On 21 February 1943 Lanz was replaced by Werner Kempf and the detachment was renamed to reflect this change. In February–March that year, The detachment fought in the Third Battle of Kharkov.

The detachment took part in the Battle of Kursk. Beginning on the night of 4/5 July 1943, the III Panzer Corps, the detachment's primary attack formation, spearheaded the thrust east of Belgorod. After the failure of the operation, Army Detachment Kempf retreated with the rest of Army Group South. Kempf was relieved of command on 17 August 1943. He was replaced by Otto Wöhler on August 16 and the detachment was designated as the 8th Army.

The order of battle for Operation Citadel was:

- III Panzer Corps: 6th, 7th, & 19th Panzer Divisions, 168th Infantry Division
- XI Army Corps: 106th, 198th, 320th Infantry Divisions
- XLII Army Corps: 39th, 161st, 282nd Infantry Divisions

== Commander ==
| No. | Portrait | Commander | Took office | Left office | Time in office |
|---|---|---|---|---|---|
| 1 | Hubert Lanz | General der Gebirgstruppe; Hubert Lanz (1896–1982) | 1 February 1943 | 21 February 1943 | 20 days |
| 2 | Werner Kempf | General der Panzertruppe; Werner Kempf (1886–1964) | 21 February 1943 | 16 August 1943 | 176 days |
| 3 | Otto Wöhler | General der Infanterie; Otto Wöhler (1894–1987) | 17 August 1943 | 22 August 1943 | 5 days |
