= Okalewo =

- Village
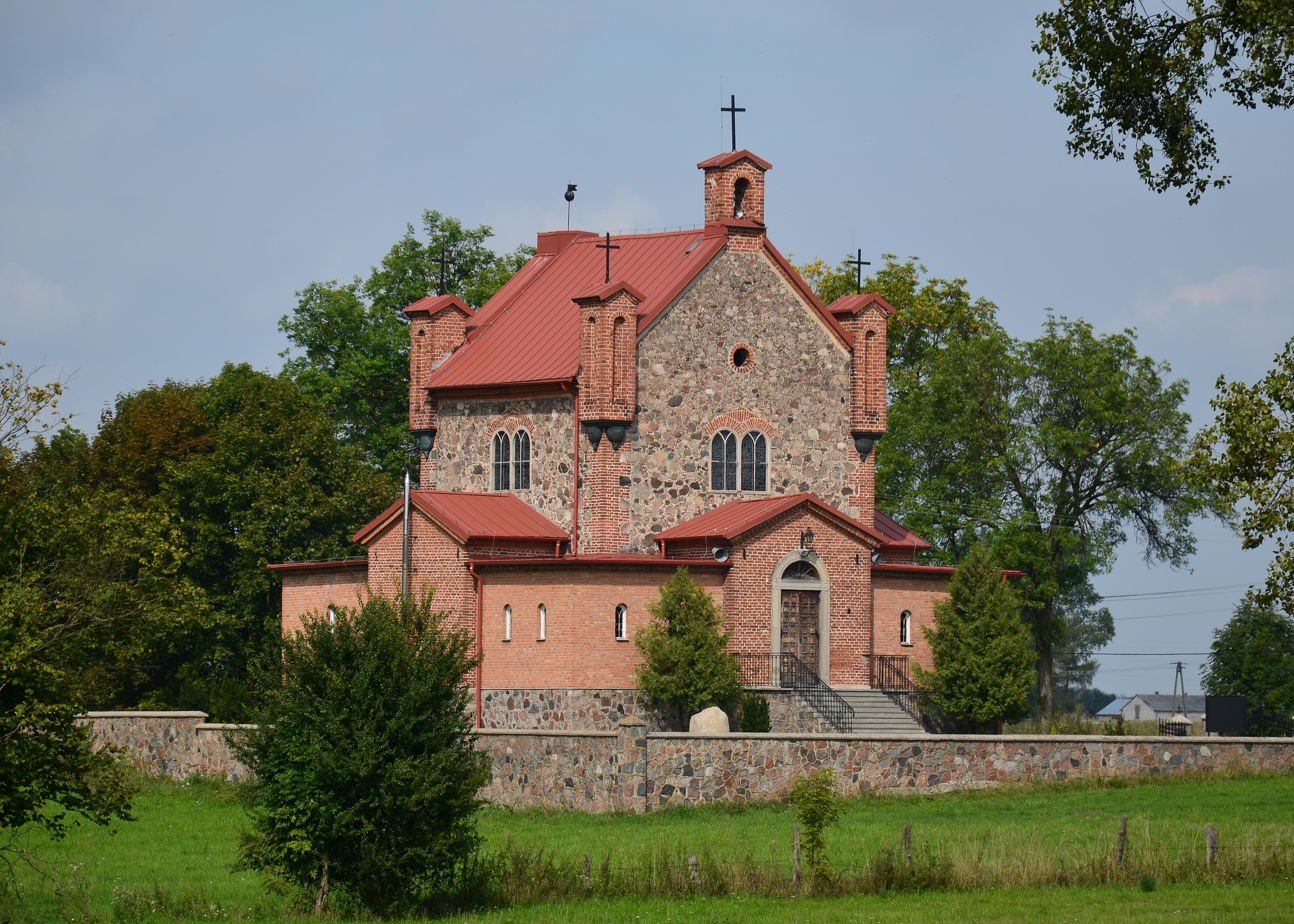
- Our Lady of the Scapular church in Okalewo

- Location within Poland
- Coordinates: 53°4′N 19°37′E
- Country: Poland
- Voivodeship: Kuyavian-Pomeranian
- County: Rypin
- Gmina: Skrwilno
- Population: 900
- Time zone: UTC+1 (CET)
  - Summer (DST): UTC+2 (CEST)
- Vehicle registration: CRY

Okalewo [ɔkaˈlɛvɔ] is a village in the administrative district of Gmina Skrwilno, within Rypin County, Kuyavian-Pomeranian Voivodeship, in north-central Poland.

== History ==
In 1827, the village had a population of 341. A steam mill was built in 1869.

During the German occupation of Poland (World War II), local teachers were among Polish teachers from the county deceitfully gathered at a supposed formal meeting and then massacred in Rypin in November 1939 (see Intelligenzaktion). Furthermore, a Polish teacher from Sławianowo was murdered by the occupiers in the forest of Okalewo.

== Notable people ==
- Czesław Młot-Fijałkowski (1892–1944), brigadier general of the Polish Army
