= Werner Kempf =

German general (1886–1964)

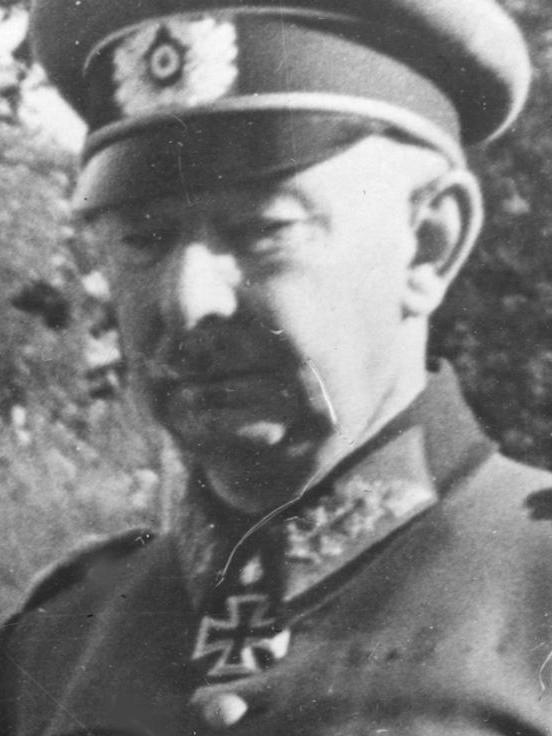
- Kempf in 1943
- Born: 9 March 1886; Königsberg, East Prussia, German Empire
- Died: 6 January 1964 (aged 77); Bad Harzburg, West Germany
- Military career
- Allegiance: German Empire; Weimar Republic; Nazi Germany
- Branch: German Army
- Service years: 1905–1945
- Rank: General der Panzertruppe
- Commands: XXXXVIII Panzer Corps; Army Detachment Kempf
- Conflicts: World War I World War II
- Awards: Knight's Cross of the Iron Cross with Oak Leaves

Werner Kempf (9 March 1886 – 6 January 1964) was a general in the German Army rising to corps-level command during World War II. Kempf is best known for commanding the Army Detachment Kempf during the Battle of Kursk.

== Career ==
Kempf joined the Imperial German Army in 1905; following World War I, he served in the Reichswehr and later the Wehrmacht. In October 1937 Kempf took command of the newly formed 4th Panzer Brigade; in January 1939 he was promoted to Generalmajor. At the beginning of World War II in Europe, he took part in the invasion of Poland as commander of Panzer Division Kempf, which was also known as the Panzerverband Ostpreußen (Panzer Group East Prussia) of the 3rd Army under Georg von Küchler. As divisional commander, he received the capitulation of Fort Zakroczym, which was followed by Massacre in Zakroczym, at the conclusion of the Battle of Modlin. The division returned to East Prussia at the end of the Poland campaign, and Kempf was named commander of the 1st Light Division, renamed 6th Panzer Division, on 18 October 1939.

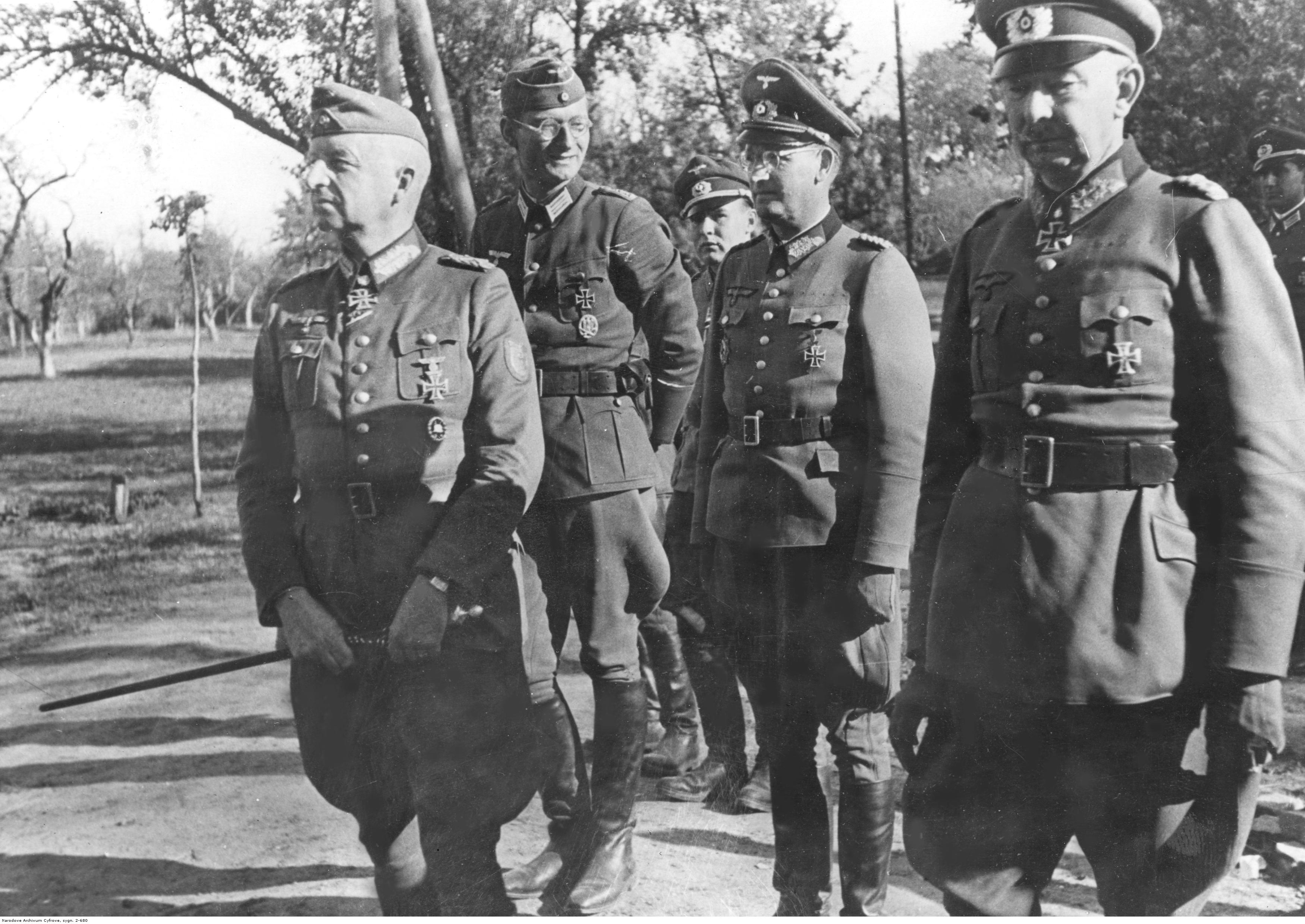
Marshall Erich von Manstein during the inspection of the unit on the Eastern Front 1943

In 1939 and 1940 Kempf led the 6th Panzer Division in the Battle of France. He was awarded the Knight's Cross of the Iron Cross on 3 June 1940 for his role in the campaign, and was promoted to Generalleutnant on 1 August 1940. On 6 January 1941, he was ordered to form XLVIII Army Corps (motorized), and became its commander, along with a promotion to General der Panzertruppe, on 1 April 1941. With this corps Kempf took part in Operation Barbarossa, the invasion of the Soviet Union, starting on 22 June 1941, as part of Panzer Group 1 of Army Group South, where the corps took part in the Battle of Uman and Battle of Kiev (1941), and pushed as far as Kursk.

From 5 May 1942 he was commanding general of the XLVIII Panzer Corps and was in this position on 10 August 1942 when he was awarded the Oak leaves to the Knight's Cross. At the end of September 1942, Kempf was transferred to the Führerreserve, before the Battle of Stalingrad. In July 1943, he participated in the Battle of Kursk as commander of the Army Detachment Kempf. From May to September 1944 he was commander of the Wehrmacht in the Baltics. He was then moved to the leadership reserve until he was taken into captivity in May 1945. He was released in 1947.

== Awards and decorations ==
- Iron Cross (1914) 2nd Class (15 September 1914) & 1st Class (28 February 1916)
- Clasp to the Iron Cross (1939) 2nd Class (15 September 1939) & 1st Class (28 September 1939)
- Knight's Cross of the Iron Cross with Oak Leaves
  - Knight's Cross on 3 June 1940 as Generalleutnant and commander of 6 Panzer-Division
  - 111th Oak Leaves on 10 August 1942 as General der Panzertruppe and commander of XLVIII. Panzerkorps
