= Oflag IV-B Königstein =

World War II German prisoner-of-war camp

Oflag IV-B
- Königstein, Saxony
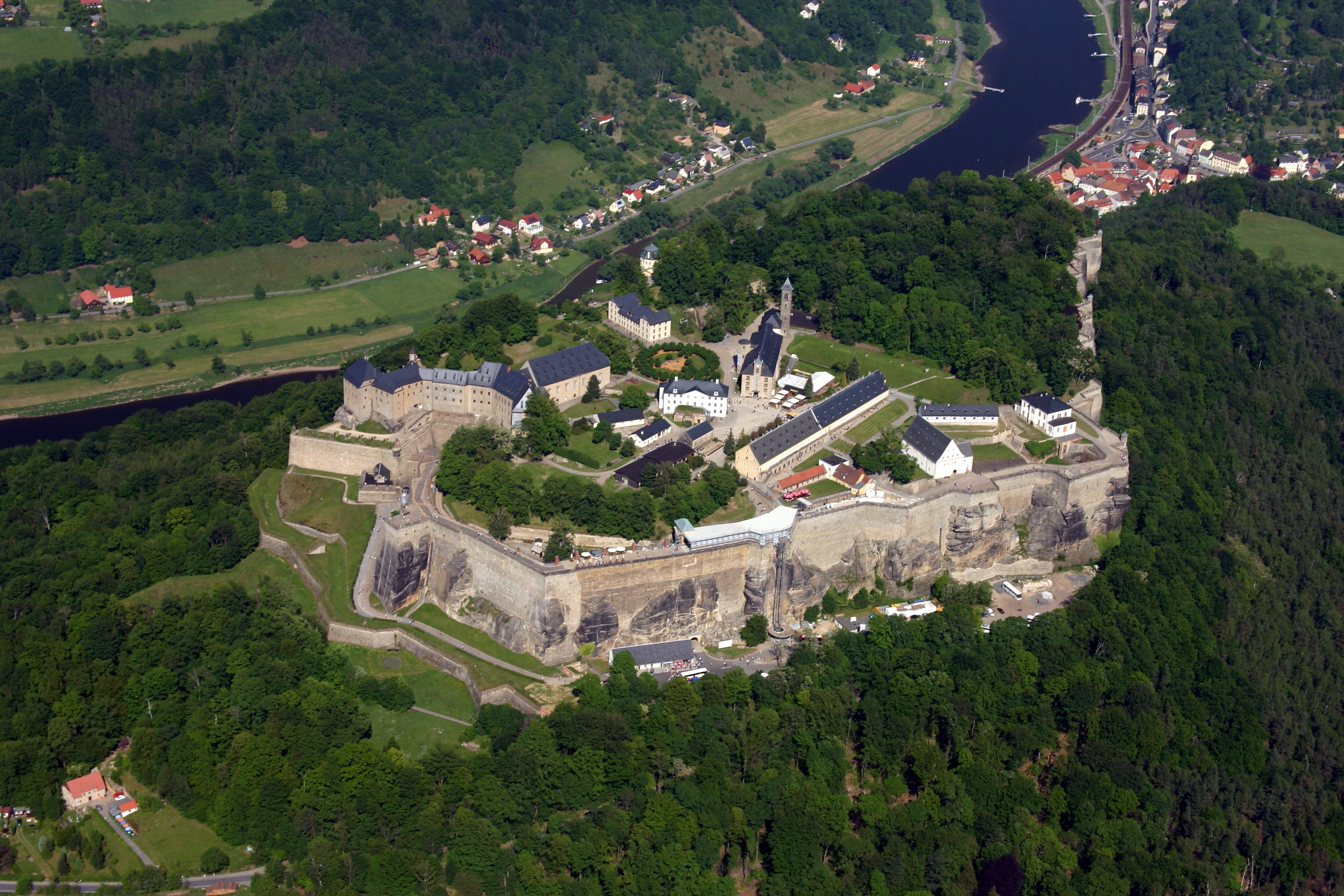
- Festung Königstein

Site information
- Type: Prisoner-of-war camp
- Controlled by: Nazi Germany

Location
- Königstein, Germany, (pre-war borders, 1937)
- Coordinates: 50.91889°N 14.05667°E

Site history
- In use: 1939–1945

Garrison information
- Occupants: Allied officers

Oflag IV-B Koenigstein was a German POW camp for Allied officers during World War II. It was located in Festung Königstein ("Königstein Fortress") near the town of Königstein in Saxony.

== Camp history ==
After the Invasion of Poland of 1939, most high-ranking Polish officers were imprisoned there. The staff officers were imprisoned in the casemates and the generals in one of the forts. The lower-ranking officers were incarcerated in the lower levels of the fortress. Despite harsh conditions in the living chambers, the officers were granted relative freedom and had a part of the fortress gardens at their disposal. Apart from Antoni Szylling and Tadeusz Piskor, who were imprisoned in Murnau, all Polish army commanders taken by the Germans in 1939 were held there. After the Fall of France in 1940, most Polish officers were transferred to either Oflag VIIA Murnau or Oflag VIII E Johannisbrunn, and French officers were imprisoned in the castle.

After being freed in 1941, an orderly to a French admiral wrote that life there was boring but "not particularly onerous", with "adequate by European prison standards" sanitation, inadequate but regular rations, and cigarettes for purchase. The prisoners quickly found German bugs in their rooms, and discovered that an "English general" imprisoned with them was a German agent. The orderly estimated that 20% of the 120 French general officers favored cooperation with Germany (with many freed to join the Vichy government), 30% favored the Allies, and 50% were neutral.

In retaliation to the killing of general Fritz von Brodowski while in French custody, an execution order of all French generals was written by the Director of the Reich Security Main Office, SS general Ernst Kaltenbrunner. Only one execution was to be carried out, General Gustave Mesny, shot in the neck with a bullet near Nossen.

The camp was surrendered to the French General Condé on 8 May, the French flag was raised over the fortress for a while. A few Russians reached the fortress on 9 May 1945. The Russians stayed only long enough to remove anything of value, and loading up the German guards, they returned to their HQ leaving the French Generals alone. A short while afterwards, a French light aircraft landed and the pilot informed them that he had come to collect General Saint Ceran of the French Air Force. The remaining inmates asked that he inform the Americans of their plight which he did, and despite Koenigstein being in the Russian zone, a decision was taken to swiftly remove the French generals from the castle on 11 May. They were flown back to Paris on 12 May, many of them free for the first time in five years.

== Notable inmates ==
- General Henri Giraud (France) - Commander, 7th Army, captured 19 May 1940, escaped 17 April 1942.
- General René Prioux (France) - Commander, Corps de Cavalerie, captured 29 May 1940, released April 1942.
- Brigadier General Alphonse Juin (France) - Commander, 15th Motorized Infantry Division, surrendered on 30 May 1940, released 15 June 1941.
- Admiral Jean-Marie Charles Abrial (France) - Commander-in-Chief of Northern Naval Forces, surrendered on 19 June 1940, released 20 July 1940.
- General Auguste Alaurent (France)- captured in Dunkirk, remained in the Königstein until 9 May 1945
- Major-General Franciszek Kleeberg (Poland) - Commander, Independent Operational Group Polesie, surrendered 6 October 1939, died 5 April 1941.
- Major-General Juliusz Rómmel (Poland) - Commander, Łódź Army and Warsaw Army, signed the final act of capitulation of Warsaw on 28 September.
- Major-General Władysław Bortnowski (Poland) - taken captive during the Battle of Bzura.
- General Henri Winkelman (Netherlands) - Commander-in-chief, Armed forces of the Netherlands, surrendered on 14 May 1940, liberated May 1945.
- General Otto Ruge (Norway) - Chief of Defence of Norway, arrested June 1940, liberated May 1945.

== See also ==
- List of prisoner-of-war camps in Germany
