= Oflag VII-A Murnau =

World War II German prisoner-of-war camp

Oflag VII-A
- Murnau am Staffelsee, Bavaria
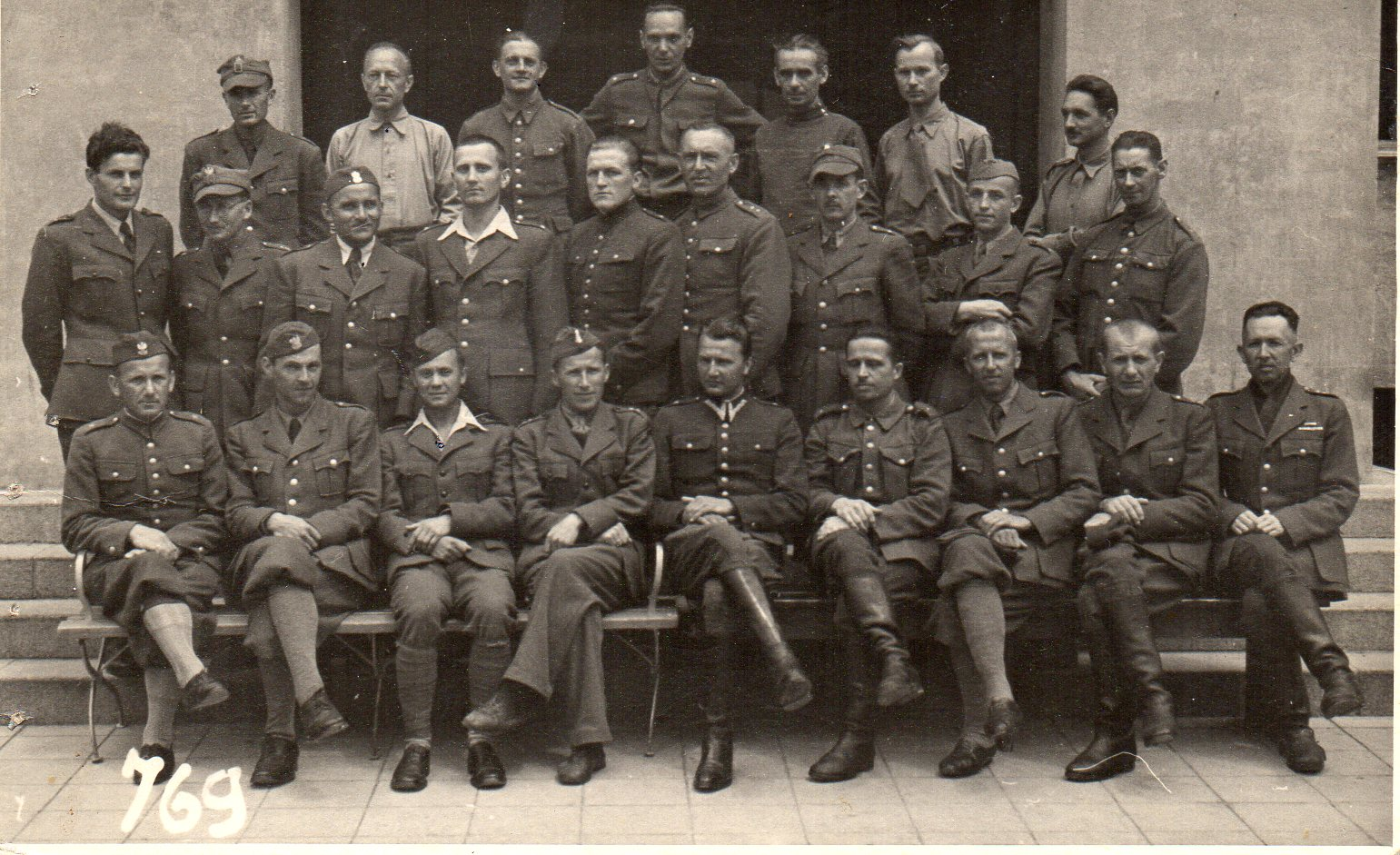
- A group of Polish officers in Oflag VII-A

Site information
- Type: Prisoner-of-war camp
- Controlled by: Nazi Germany

Location
- Murnau, Germany (pre-war borders, 1937)
- Location within Germany
- Coordinates: 47.690442°N 11.205106°E

Site history
- In use: 1939-1945
- Battles/wars: World War II

Garrison information
- Occupants: Polish Army officers

Oflag VII-A Murnau was a German Army prisoner-of-war camp for Polish Army officers during World War II. It was located 2 km (1.2 mi) north of the Bavarian town of Murnau am Staffelsee.

== Camp history ==
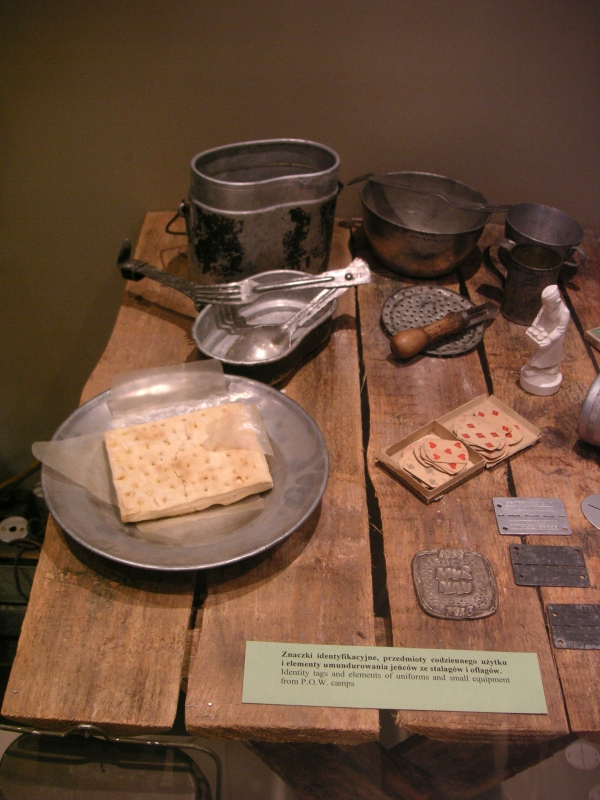
Various items of daily use from Oflag VII-A (from the Museum of the Polish Army, Warsaw)

The camp was created in September 1939. It consisted of an enclosure 200 m (660 ft) square, surrounded with barbed wire and guard towers. Immediately after the German invasion of Poland, at the beginning of World War II, some 1,000 Polish officers were imprisoned there. On April 27, 1942, additional Polish POWs were transferred there from the so-called "Generals' Camp" Oflag VIII-E in Janské Koupele in German-occupied Czechoslovakia (now in the Czech Republic). In October 1944, 592 Polish insurgents of the suppressed Warsaw Uprising were brought from Stalag 344, and further Polish officers were brought later from Stalag VII-A. By early 1945 the number of POWs held in the camp reached over 5,000.

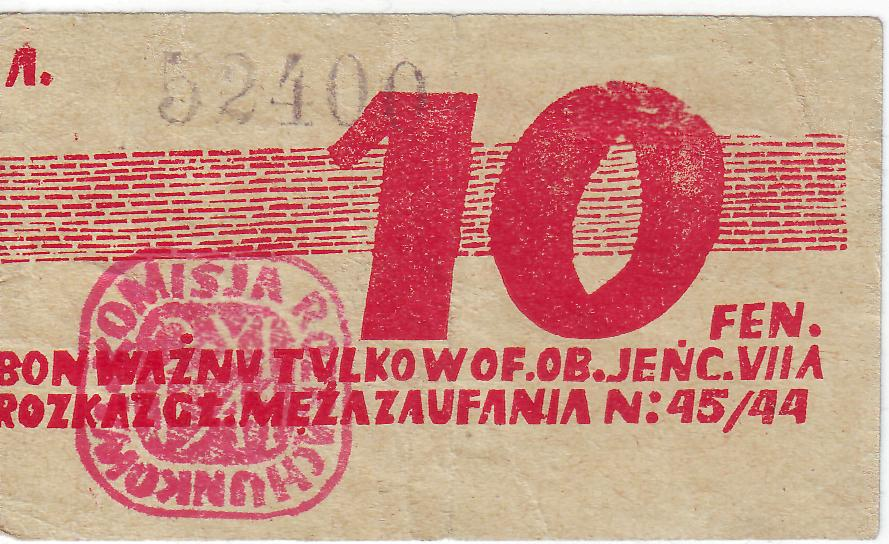
Ten-pfennig voucher of the camp’s Settlement Commission, 1944

On 2 November 1944, the camp’s Settlement Commission (Komisja Rozrachunkowa) issued vouchers in denominations from one pfennig to five marks under an order from Colonel Józef Korycki. Reserve Second Lieutenant Tadeusz Kluźniak designed and cut the wooden printing blocks. By December, vouchers with a total value of approximately 100,000 marks were in circulation.

The camps was liberated by troops of the U.S. 12th Armored Division on 29 April 1945.

== List of notable prisoners ==
Among those imprisoned in Murnau were:

=== Rear Admiral (Kontradmirał) ===
- Józef Unrug

=== Divisional Generals (Generał dywizji) ===
- Władysław Bortnowski
- Tadeusz Kutrzeba
- Tadeusz Piskor
- Juliusz Rómmel

=== Brigade Generals (Generał brygady) ===
- Roman Abraham
- Franciszek Alter
- Władysław Bończa-Uzdowski
- Leopold Cehak
- Jan Chmurowicz
- Walerian Czuma
- Franciszek Dindorf-Ankowicz
- Juliusz Drapella
- Janusz Gąsiorowski
- Edmund Knoll-Kownacki
- Wincenty Kowalski
- Jan Kazimierz Kruszewski
- Józef Kwaciszewski
- Stanisław Małachowski
- Czesław Młot-Fijałkowski
- Bernard Mond
- Zygmunt Piasecki
- Wacław Piekarski
- Zygmunt Podhorski
- Emil Przedrzymirski-Krukowicz
- Zdzisław Przyjałkowski
- Jan Jagmin-Sadowski
- Antoni Szylling
- Stanisław Taczak
- Wiktor Thommée
- Juliusz Zulauf

=== Officers ===
- Witold Pilecki, former prisoner no 4859 of Auschwitz under assumed name of Tomasz Serafiński; Murnau prisoner no 101892

=== Majors ===
- Seweryn Kulesza
- Edward Pach

=== Captains ===
- Bronisław Przyłuski
- Władysław Dawidek
- Stanisław Guliński

== See also ==
- List of prisoner-of-war camps in Germany
