= Sławianowo =

- Village
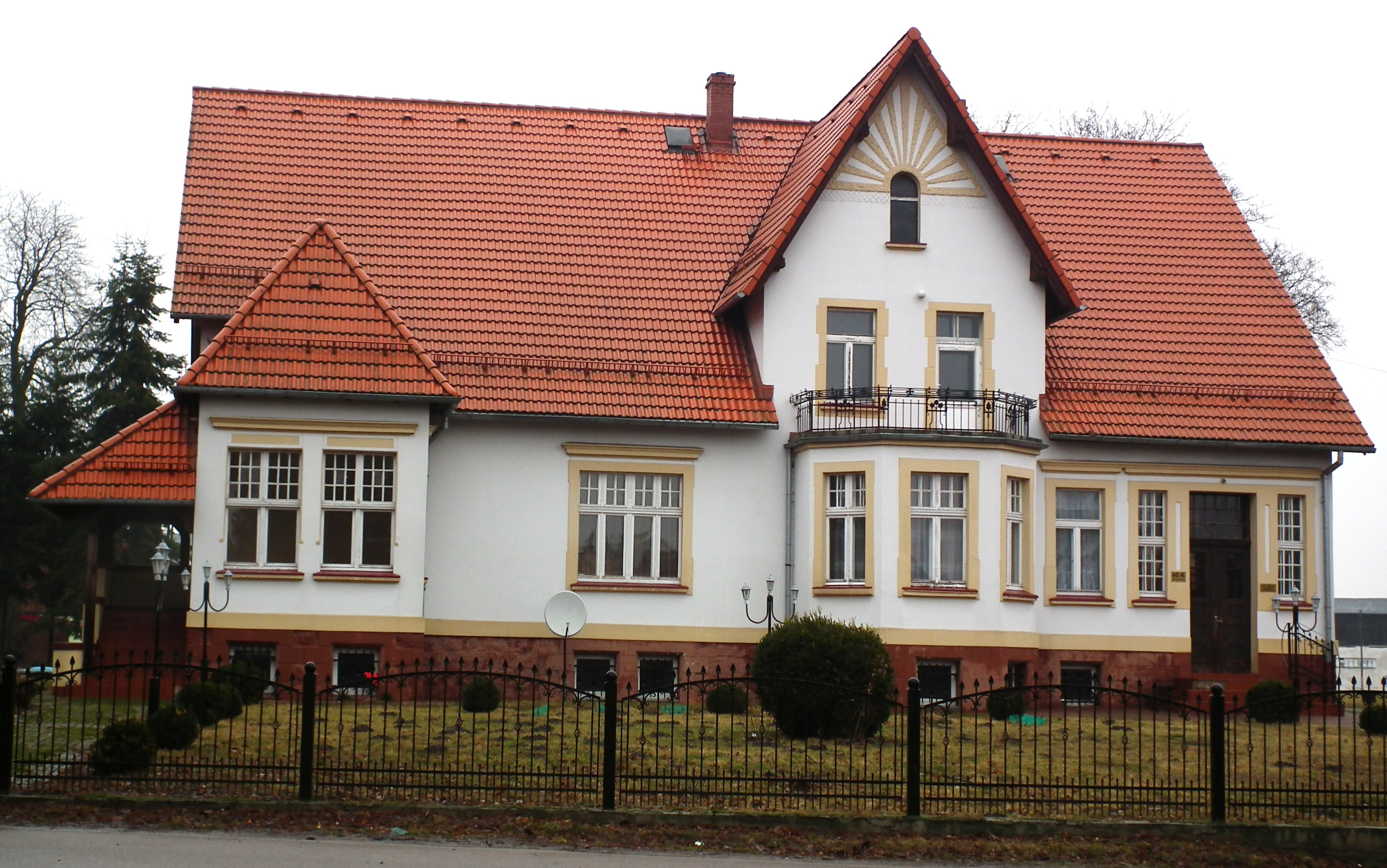
- Old manor house in Sławianowo

- Location within Poland
- Coordinates: 53°16′N 17°9′E
- Country: Poland
- Voivodeship: Greater Poland
- County: Złotów
- Gmina: Złotów
- Population: 410
- Time zone: UTC+1 (CET)
  - Summer (DST): UTC+2 (CEST)
- Vehicle registration: PZL

Sławianowo [swavjaˈnɔvɔ] is a village in the administrative district of Gmina Złotów, within Złotów County, Greater Poland Voivodeship, in north-central Poland. It is situated on the northern shore of Lake Sławianowskie Wielkie in the ethnocultural region of Krajna in the historic region of Greater Poland.

== History ==
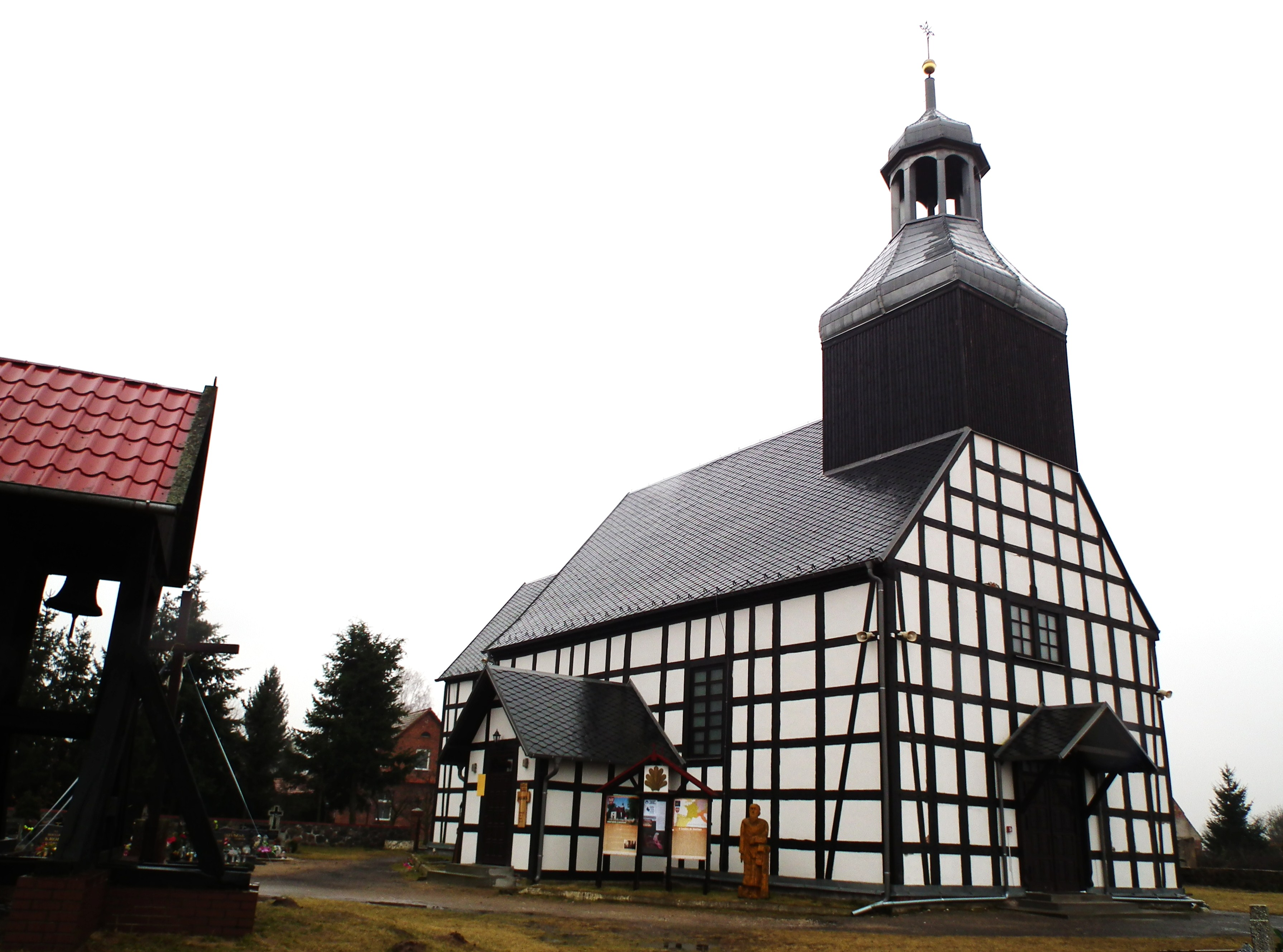
St. Jacob the Apostle Church

The territory became a part of the emerging Polish state under its first historic ruler Mieszko I in the 10th century. Sławianowo was a private village of Polish nobility, including the Działyński family, administratively located in the Nakło County in the Kalisz Voivodeship in the Greater Poland Province. In 1704, the Brotherhood of Saint Barbara was founded in Sławianowo.

In 1885, it had a population of 140.

In 1939, the Germans arrested the local Polish parish priest, and murdered a local Polish teacher in Okalewo (see: Nazi crimes against the Polish nation), and the village was renamed to Steinmark in attempt to erase traces of Polish origin. During World War II, the German occupying administration operated a forced labour subcamp of the Stalag II-B prisoner-of-war camp for Allied POWs in the village. Following Germany's defeat in World War II, in 1945, the village became again part of Poland and its historic name was restored.
