= Modlin Fortress =

Large fortress in Poland

Coordinates: 52°26′18″N 20°40′55″E

- Nowy Dwór Mazowiecki, Poland
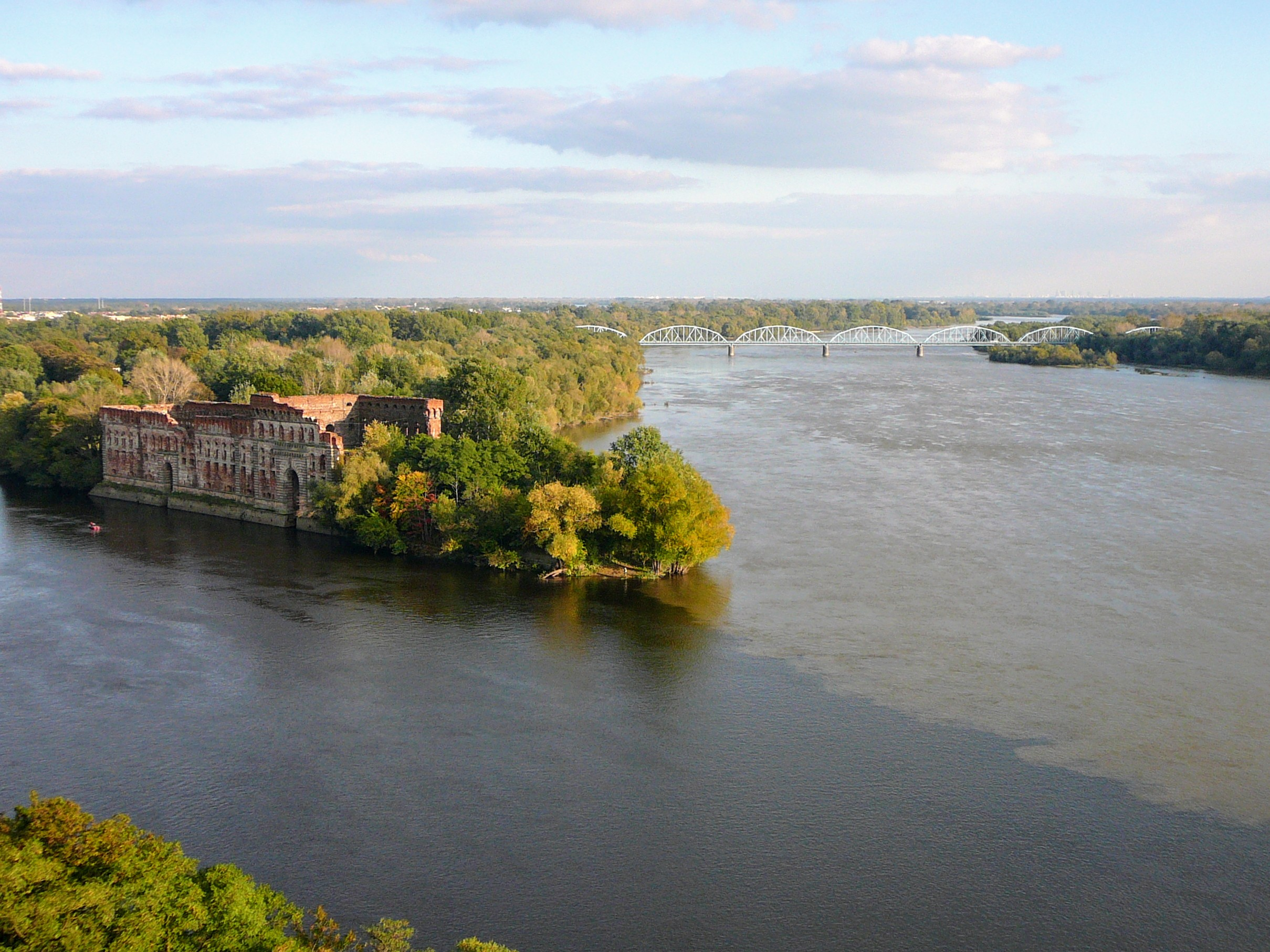
- One of the bridgeheads on the other side of the Narew

Site information
- Type: Bastion citadel
- Controlled by: France, Imperial Russia, Poland

Site history
- Built: 1806–1812
- In use: 1812–present
- Battles/wars: November Uprising, Battle of Modlin

Airfield information
- Identifiers

Modlin Fortress (Polish: Twierdza Modlin), called in Russian the Novogeorgievsk Fortress (Russian: Крепость Новогеоргиевск), is one of the largest 19th-century fortresses in Poland. It is located in the town of Nowy Dwór Mazowiecki in district Modlin on the Narew river, approximately 50 kilometers north of Warsaw. It was originally constructed by the French from 1806 to 1812.

== History ==
The strategic importance of the area limited by the Vistula, Bug, Wkra and Narew was known to various armies throughout the ages. The first fortified stronghold was built in Zakroczym by the Piast dynasty in the 11th century.

The first modern fortifications in the area of today's citadel were built by the forces of the Polish Masovian troops, which established a camp here in September 1655 to defend against the Swedish invasion. These were fortified artillery positions defending the crossings over the Vistula and Bugonarew, and a moat protecting the camp from the east. During the Battle of Nowy Dwór Mazowiecki, Polish forces blocked the crossing of Swedish troops for ten days, then, forced to retreat by Swedish artillery fire, they broke away from the enemy, using the fortifications and terrain obstacles, avoiding destruction.

The next modern fortified position was built there in 1656 by the Swedish armies during The Deluge. The so-called Bugskansen was a star-shaped fortified military camp, located probably close to the confluence of the Narew and the Vistula, at the so-called Swedish Island. The camp was also guarding a wooden bridge over the Vistula prior to the battle of Zakroczym and served as the main supply depot of the Swedish army during the battle of Warsaw of July 1656. After the Swedish defeat the fort was demolished in 1660 and the area remained unfortified for roughly 150 years.

After the Partitions of Poland the area was incorporated into the Russian Empire. Shortly afterward Jan Pieter van Suchtelen, a Dutch military engineer in Russian service prepared a construction plan for a mighty fortress in the area, named after the nearby town of Zakroczym. The fort was to be a bastion fortress, located approximately 1.5 km from the rivers and with several forts guarding the area from the west. However, the project was never accomplished as in 1806 the area became part of the Duchy of Warsaw, a rump Polish state created by and allied to Napoleon Bonaparte.

From the very beginning of French presence in Poland, Bonaparte's engineers started to fortify the border with Russia, expecting either a Russian offensive towards western Europe – or a future offensive of the French armies towards Petersburg and Moscow. In December 1806, while in Poznań, Napoleon ordered a fort to be built on two islands located at the confluence of the Narew and the Vistula. The fortification was to be temporary and was to become primarily a supply depot and a huge granary, serving as a supply centre for the forces operating in Poland or Russia. The construction started almost immediately, although chief engineer of the French forces Gen. François de Chasseloup-Laubat decided to build the fortress on the northern bank of the river rather than on the islands. The work started in early 1807, yet went on very slowly. It was not until the following year that the pace was speeded up, and in 1809 the first casemates and walls were ready. It was there that the core of the Polish Army was stationed after the Battle of Raszyn against the invading forces of Austria. Soon after the outer rim of defences on the right bank of the Vistula was ready. It ran more or less along the inner line of modern fortifications. It consisted of a semi-circular earthwork reinforced with wooden stockade and five bastions. In addition, the area was guarded by two fortified bridgeheads, one in Kazuń on the left bank of the Vistula and the other next to Nowy Dwór Mazowiecki.

Warsaw fortified region, including Warsaw and Novogeorgievsk fortresses and connecting works. Works marked in grey were planned but never built. By 1914 the Warsaw fortress was deactivated.

In 1810 the very concept of the fort was changed and Napoleon decided to turn Modlin into a pivotal fortress in his line of fortifications and expand it significantly by adding an outer rim of defenses. General de Chasseloup-Laubat was replaced with a famous French engineer Jean Mallet de Granville (later a naturalized Pole under the name of Jan Malletski), aided by Gen. François Haxo. It is not certain whether the authors of the expansion were the two to supervise its construction, or Napoleon himself. The works continued on a very fast pace as Napoleon was planning his campaign in Russia and envisioned Modlin to become the main fortress behind his lines. By September 1811 more than 19,000 people were taking part in the works. Because of that the authorities of the Duchy of Warsaw were considering to grant Modlin with a city charter, which however did not succeed. Although the following year, shortly before the outbreak of the Franco-Russian War, the number of workers exceeded 20 thousands, the fortress was never fully completed.

The French plans included a fortified area composed of three, semi-independent fortifications. The main line of defences was located on the right bank of Vistula and Narew, and was composed of a polygonal fortification with 4 bastions and 3 linking ravelins (one facing the Utrata river, one facing the village of Modlin and one in the centre). The ravelins were between 800 and 1000 meters away from the main line of fortifications, in order to reinforce the defenses against new models of heavy artillery. The second part of the fortress was the Kazuń bridgehead on the left bank of the Vistula, composed of a single ravelin. The third was a redoubt located between Vistula and Narew and the fourth was an artillery nest located on the Swedish Island. Among the engineers to supervise the construction were also Gen. Ignacy Prądzyński, Gen. Prevo-Vernois and Lt. Col. Filip Mięciszewski. After the defeat of the Grande Armée at Moscow, the fortress was taken over by the forces of the Duchy of Warsaw. On 5 February 1813 the Russian army of 36,000 soldiers arrived to the fortress and laid siege to it. The Polish forces under Dutch general Herman Willem Daendels defended the fortress until 1 December 1813. It was the last of the French fortresses along the Vistula to capitulate.

== Fortress in Congress Poland ==
After 1815 the fortress found itself in Congress Poland, a state which was a part of the Russian Empire, but had considerable autonomy and an army of its own. It was weakly manned by Polish and Russian units, and little new construction work was carried out. During the November Uprising of 1830 the fortress was prepared for defense by Polish units, but the Russian army did not storm it. It surrendered on 9 October 1831 as one of the last points controlled by Polish units during the uprising.

== Russian Fortress Novogeorgievsk ==
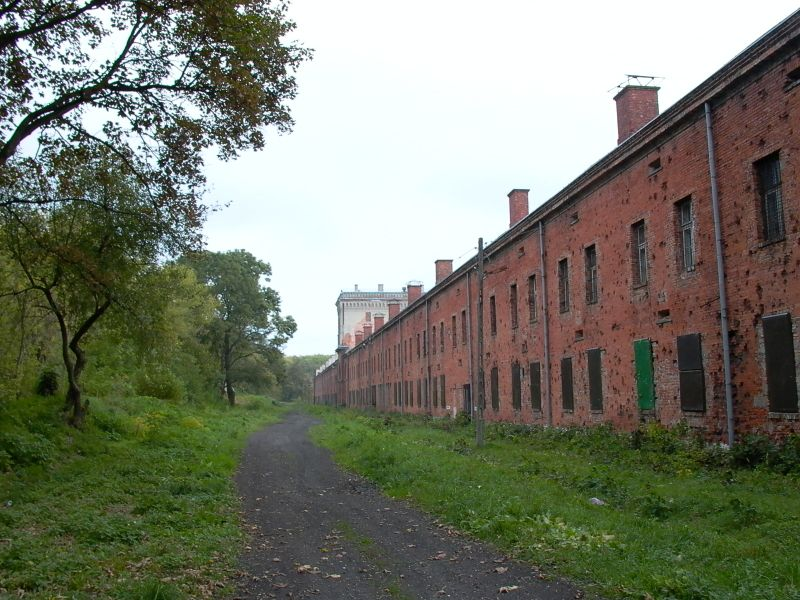
Barracks within the Modlin Fortress.

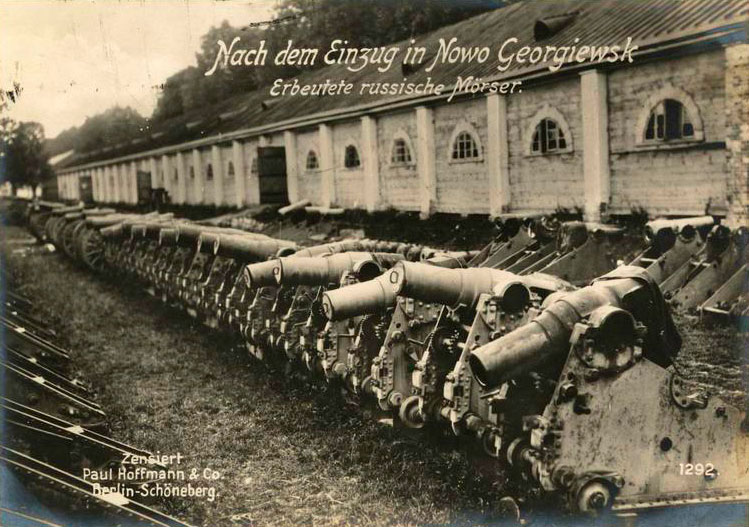
Russian mortars captured at Novo Georgievsk 1915

After the November Uprising of 1830 the Russian rule over Congress Poland became more severe. The Modlin fortress was renamed Novogeorgievsk in 1834 and during the years 1832–1841 underwent a huge expansion, to host garrison troops who were tasked with preventing another Polish uprising, as well as defend Russia's western frontiers. It was part of the chain of fortresses which included Warsaw, Ivangorod, and Brest-Litovsk. The most notable new work built was a fortified barracks building 2,200 m in length, which was to serve as the last line of defense for the fortress. After 1841 construction work largely ceased, and over the next 40 years the fortress gradually became obsolete. However, in 1844 the large granary building was built at the estuary of the Narew River. Polish architect Jan Jakub Gay designed the granary not only for storing food, but also as a defensible position at the bridgehead of the rivers.

When relations between Germany and Russia deteriorated in the 1880s, with Germany entering the Triple Alliance potentially aimed against Russia, the decision was made to expand the fortress and upgrade it to modern standards. In the years 1883–1888 eight modern forts were added, roughly forming a ring with 2 to 4 km distance from the central fortress. In the following years these forts were modernized. At the same time, additional defensive works were built to integrate the fortress into the larger fortified region around Warsaw.

The defeat of Russia in the Russo-Japanese War caused a rethinking of Russian strategy. In particular the idea of concentrating forces in the interior away from the borders before hostilities began to gain popularity. This approach would eliminate the need for a chain of border fortresses to screen the mobilizing units.

In 1909 when General Vladimir Sukhomlinov became the War Minister for the Russian Empire, one proposal he made was to scrap the bulk of the Russian fortress system, and Novogeorgievsk was a prime example of why they should be scrapped: The outer forts were initially built at a distance of about eight kilometers from the citadel to protect it from attacking artillery; by 1900, even field guns could fire past that distance. Sukhomlinov was overruled. Instead of being razed, the fort system was slated for an 800 million ruble upgrade with a new belt of forts to be added. The fortress was also to receive a large number of heavy artillery pieces. The intensive new construction work started in 1912 and continued almost until the German army approached the fortress in 1915 during World War I. The fortress was now designed to serve as a center of resistance deep behind enemy lines if the Russian army were forced to retreat from Poland. The works were carried out in great haste, not all equipment was fitted, and some construction materials were improvised and hence of lower quality. Even with these defects, the fortress with its nineteen forts was one of the strongest fortifications in Europe at the outbreak of World War I. The Russian high command expected that if surrounded by the German armies it would hold out for many months, serving as a major thorn in the German rear.

== Capture by the Germans ==
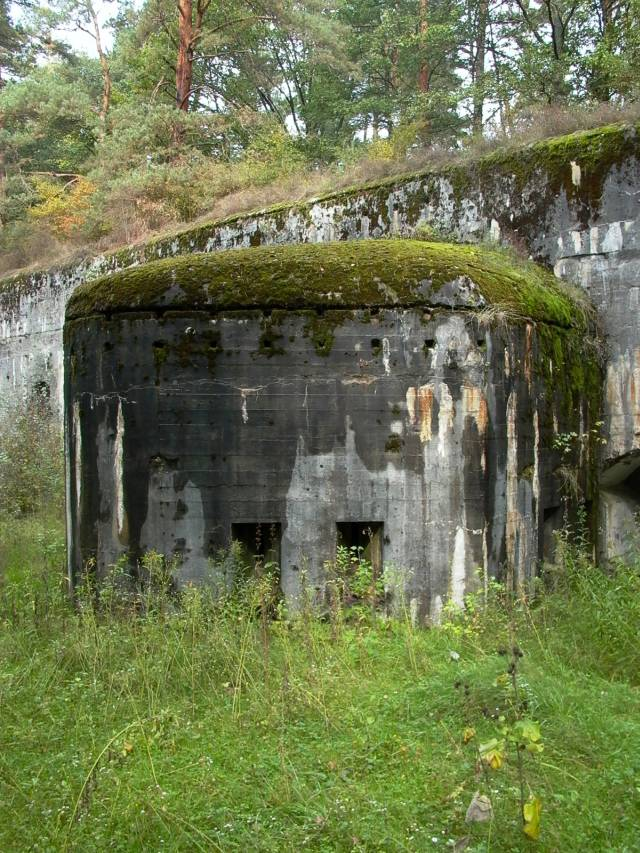
Defensive work in Fort XV, one of the forts constructed in 1912–1915 and a site of heavy fighting during World War I

In the summer of 1915, the Russians were reeling from the German attacks in Poland. They were faced with the reality of giving up Poland to the Germans or have their forces cut off from retreat.

The problem of the retreat was the abandonment of the fortresses especially Novogeorgievsk. Novogeorgievsk was seen as the "symbol of Russian rule in Poland." It would also mean the abandonment of Poland, which would compromise their ability to negotiate for more territory if the Allies won.

Mikhail Alekseyev, the commander of the Polish sector, knew that to garrison the forts was a trap and the impregnability was an illusion. However, he was swayed by men of a higher social standing and left a garrison to defend Novogeorgievsk. The troops that he was able to spare were the remnants of the II. Siberian division, the 63rd division, and 58th division.

To capture Novogeorgievsk, the Germans transferred General Hans Beseler who had successfully laid siege to the Belgian city of Antwerp early in the war. In a stroke of luck, his forces captured the chief engineer of Novogeorgievsk on the first day. The Siege of Novogeorgievsk lasted only a matter of days. When it fell, the Germans captured 1,600 guns and close to a million shells.

== Post World War I ==
After the First World War Modlin became part of the Second Polish Republic and was modernized with modern bunkers, anti-tank and anti-aircraft equipment. Its main purpose was to provide cover for Warsaw from enemy attacks from the North. The fortress also housed several military barracks and military colleges for NCOs, including the Engineers Training Centre and the Armored Forces Officer Cadet School.

Modlin fortress was the place of the Battle of Modlin during the German invasion of Poland in 1939. General Wiktor Thommée ensconced the Army of Łódź in the fortress after failing to fight his way back to Warsaw, and his was one of the last Polish military units to capitulate.

== Present day ==
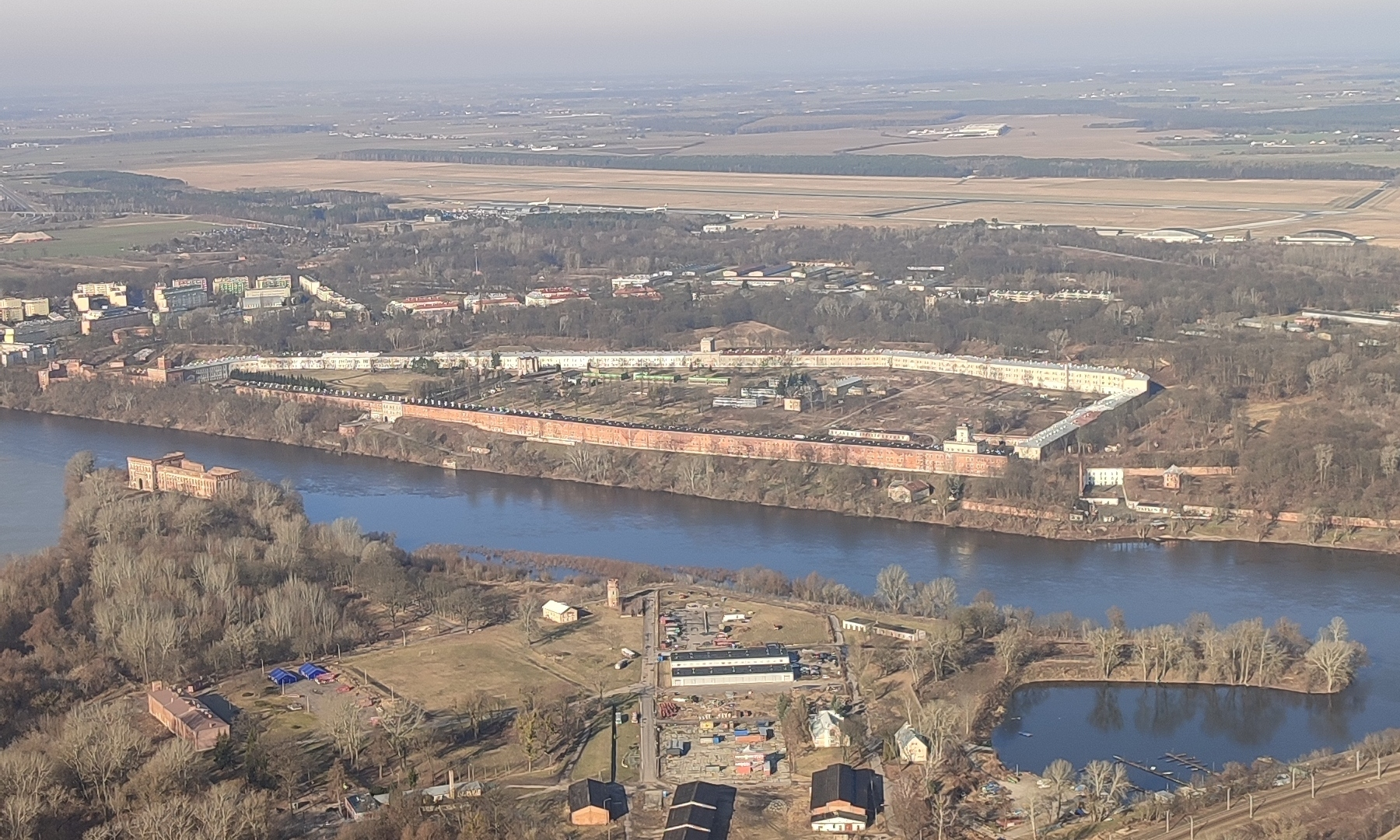
General view of the fortress

Some parts of the fortress are open to tourists. At the same time, the Polish military still has many facilities in the area and thus some redoubts are inaccessible. Some abandoned redoubts are not maintained and have deteriorated badly, with many metal elements having been pillaged for scrap. The Modlin airfield is located within the fortress area. It re-opened as the second civilian airport for the city of Warsaw in July 2012. In 2013 the Modlin Fortress was sold to private investors after being on the market for five years, but some key features such as the Tatar Tower and the White Tower must be preserved for the visiting public.

On 4th November 2025, it was announced that the fortress would be converted into a hotel.

== Notes ==
1. A misnomer as the Wyspa Szwedzka is in fact a peninsula.

== See also ==
- Battle of Modlin
- Modlin (Nowy Dwór Mazowiecki)
- Warsaw Citadel
