= Zakroczym massacre =

1939 murder of Polish soldiers by Nazi German troops

Massacre in Zakroczym
- Part of Invasion of Poland and World War II
- Zakroczym massacre (Poland)
- Location: 52°26′16″N 20°36′43″E; Zakroczym
- Date: September 28, 1939
- Attack type: War crime, massacre
- Deaths: around 600
- Victims: Polish soldiers and civilians
- Perpetrator: Panzer Division Kempf

The Massacre in Zakroczym, Poland, took place on 28 September 1939 when, in spite of a cease-fire, soldiers of Panzerdivision Kempf stormed Polish positions at Zakroczym, where soldiers from the 2nd Infantry Division were getting ready to surrender. Hundreds of Polish soldiers were murdered. The rest were beaten and abused. Many civilians were killed or wounded. German troops broke into houses, robbed them, set them on fire, and tossed hand grenades into the basements filled with scared civilians. Kazimierz Szczerbatko estimated, based on the testimony of the eyewitnesses, that the Germans killed around 500 soldiers and 100 civilians.

== See also ==
- German atrocities committed against Polish prisoners of war
