= Panzer Division Kempf =

German armored division

Panzer Division "Kempf"
- Active: August – October 1939
- Country: Nazi Germany
- Branch: Army
- Type: Panzer
- Role: Armoured warfare
- Size: Division
- Engagements: World War II; Invasion of Poland

Commanders
- Notable commanders: Werner Kempf

The Panzer Division "Kempf" (German: Panzer-Division "Kempf"), also East Prussia Panzer Formation (de: Panzerverband Ostpreußen) was an ad hoc combined arms formation consisting of regular German Army personnel and SS. It was created for operations out of East Prussia during the Invasion of Poland in 1939. The formation was generally called Panzer Division "Kempf" after General der Panzertruppe Werner Kempf assumed command, though it was only about half the strength of the other Panzer Divisions of the time.

The division participated in the Battle of Mława. The SS components of the division committed war crimes against Polish Jews (Massacre in Krasnosielc (in Polish)) on September 6, 1939, and against the Polish soldiers, civilians, including Polish Jews in the Massacre in Zakroczym on September 28, 1939.

== See also ==
- List of German divisions in World War II
- List of Waffen-SS divisions
- List of SS personnel
- List of military units named after people
