= Brigadier general (Poland) =

Polish officer rank

Brigadier general (Polish: generał brygady Polish pronunciation: [ɡɛˈnɛraw brɨˈɡadɨ], abbreviated gen. bryg.) is the lowest grade for generals in the Polish Army (both in the land forces and in the Polish Air Force). Depending on the context, it is equivalent to both the modern grade of major general and the grade of brigadier general (mostly in historical context).

The symbols of the grade are the general's wavy line and a single star, featured on both the rogatywka (the military cap) and the sleeves of the dress uniform and above the breast pocket of the field uniform.
