= Battle of Krasnystaw =

Date	19–20 September 1939
Location	Krasnystaw
Result	German Victory

Belligerents
Poland	Germany

Commanders and leaders
(Second Polish Republic) Stefan Dąb-Biernacki (Second Polish Republic) Bruno Olbrycht (Second Polish Republic) Adam Zakrzewski	(Nazi Germany) Erick-Oskar Hansen

Units involved
(Second Polish Republic) 39th Infantry Division (Poland) (Second Polish Republic) Colonel Adam Zakrzewski Cavalry Brigade.	(Nazi Germany) 4th Infantry Division (Wehrmacht)

The Battle of Krasnystaw took place during the Invasion of Poland that occurred on the 19th and 20th September 1939.

== The battle ==
The Battle of Krasnystaw was fought around the city of Krasnystaw by the Polish 39th Infantry Division and the Cavalry Brigade of Colonel Adam Zakrzewski of the Northern Front under Stefan Dąb-Biernacki against German forces. In the battle, the Northern front sought to recapture Krasnystaw from the German 4th Infantry Division as they there were blocking their southwards advance to come to the aid of Lublin Army and Kraków Army fighting at the Battle of Tomaszów Lubelski.Polish forces were unable to capture Krasnystaw in the battle and this delayed them meeting up with Lublin army and Kraków army. .

== See also ==
- List of World War II military equipment of Poland
- List of German military equipment of World War II
