= Northern Front (Poland, 1939) =

Polish Northern Front (1939) (Polish language: Front Północny, also called Army Group of General Stefan Dąb-Biernacki) was an operational unit of the Polish Army in the Invasion of Poland. It was created by order of Marshal Edward Rydz-Śmigły, on September 10, 1939.

== Background ==
The Northern Front was one of two fronts (see Polish Southern Front), created to coordinate the activities of armies fighting the advancing Wehrmacht. According to Polish military planners, the Front was to be created out of units which had retreated southwards, after defending the border with East Prussia, and reserve units, concentrated east of Warsaw. The Front was supposed to defend the line of the Narew river, but this was already impossible on September 10, the day of its creation. Another line of defence, along the Bug river, also was impossible to hold, as units of the Northern Front were scattered after heavy fighting against the Germans. The Modlin Army had withdrawn to the Modlin Fortress, while Independent Operational Group Narew had been broken into a number of smaller groups. The Prusy Army, destroyed near Piotrków Trybunalski and Radom, was slowly recreated in the area of Chełm.

== Organization ==
The Front was commanded by General Stefan Dąb-Biernacki, its quartermaster was Colonel Tadeusz Procner.

=== Elements of Lublin Army ===
- 39th Infantry Division

=== Elements of Operational Group Wyszków ===
- 1st Legions Infantry Division,
- 41st Infantry Division

=== Elements of Independent Operational Group Narew ===
- 33rd Infantry Division

=== General Władysław Anders Operational Group of Cavalry ===
- Nowogródzka Cavalry Brigade,
- parts of Mazowiecka Cavalry Brigade,
- parts of Wołyńska Cavalry Brigade
- parts of Kresowa Cavalry Brigade,
- Colonel Adam Zakrzewski Cavalry Brigade.

== Actions ==
The Northern Front for the first time got in contact with the enemy in the night of September 16/17, 1939, when Wehrmacht units, advancing from Brzesc nad Bugiem, reached the town of Włodawa. Polish forces were unable to recapture the town, but they stopped the enemy advance towards Chełm.

After news of the Soviet invasion of Poland reached General Dab Biernacki and his officers, all units of the Northern Front were ordered to march southwards, to the area of Tomaszów Lubelski, to join Kraków Army and Lublin Army. All Polish forces tried to fight their way to Lwów and the Romanian Bridgehead. The Wehrmacht, well aware of it, tried to halt Polish advance in the Battle of Tomaszów Lubelski.

The second battle of Tomaszów ended in Polish failure. Very few soldiers and officers managed to flee southwards, facing not only the Wehrmacht, but also the Red Army, which had invaded eastern Poland on September 17.

Some weak units had remained in the area of Chełm until September 25, when they retreated towards Kraśnik. These forces capitulated on September 26, after realizing that it was impossible to cross the heavily guarded San river.

== See also ==
- Polish army order of battle in 1939
- Polish contribution to World War II
- Polish Southern Front

== Sources ==
- Jurga T., U kresu II Rzeczypospolitej, Książka i Wiedza 1985, ISBN 83-05-11669-7
- Kazimierz Sobczak [red.]: Encyklopedia II wojny Swiatowej. Warszawa: Wydawnictwo Ministerstwa Obrony Narodowej, 1975, s. 148.
