= Polish army order of battle in 1939 =

World War II battle order

This article discusses the Polish order of battle during the invasion of Poland. In the late 1930s Polish headquarters prepared "Plan Zachód" (Plan "West"), a plan of mobilization of Polish Army in case of war with Germany. Earlier, the Poles did not regard the Germans as their main threat, priority was given to threat from the Soviets (see: Plan East).

The overall operational plan assumed the creation of thirty infantry divisions, nine reserve divisions, eleven cavalry brigades, two motorized brigades, three mountain brigades and a number of smaller units. Most Polish forces were grouped into six armies and a number of corps-sized "Operational Groups". Later in the course of the war other operational units were created.

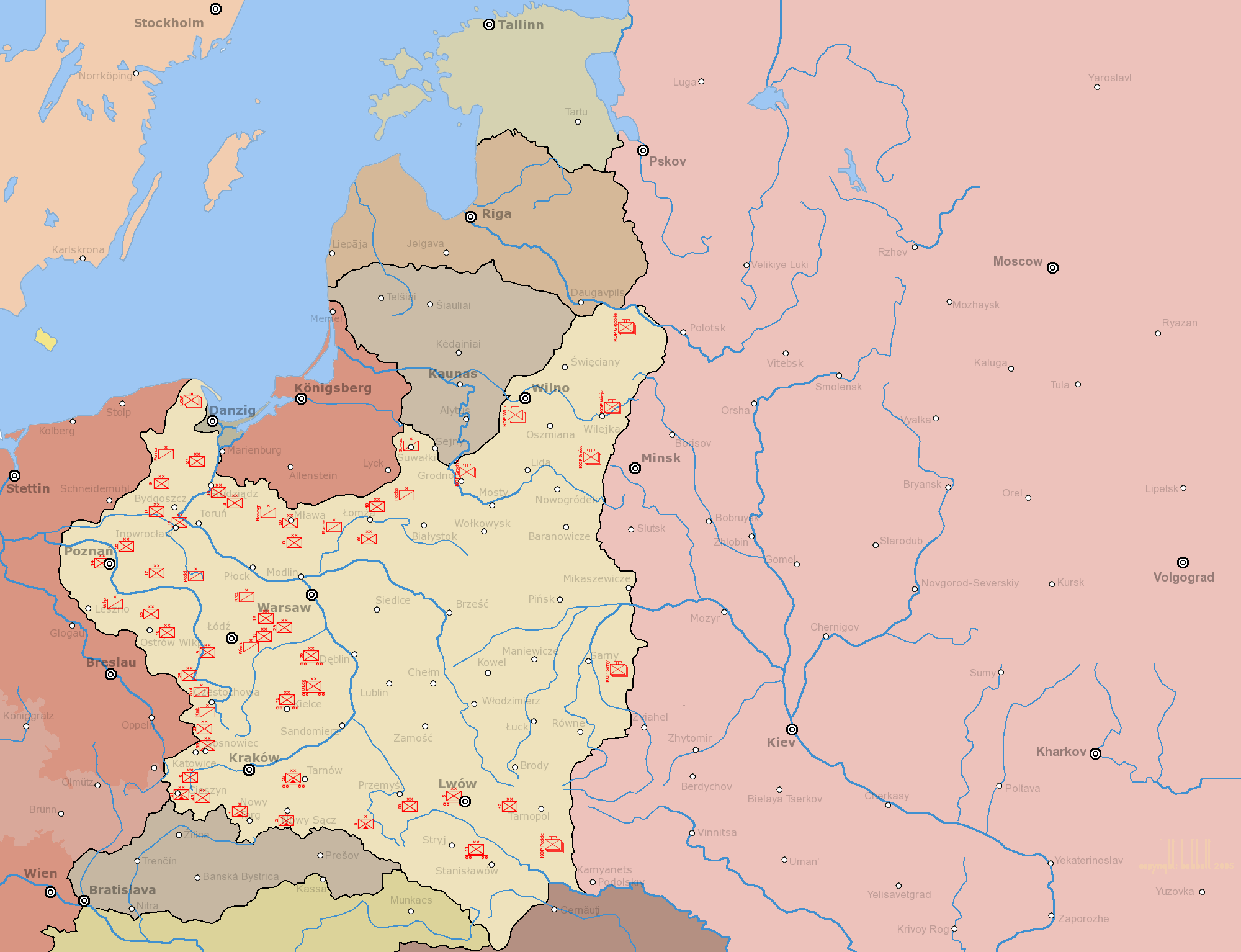
Placement of Polish divisions on September 1

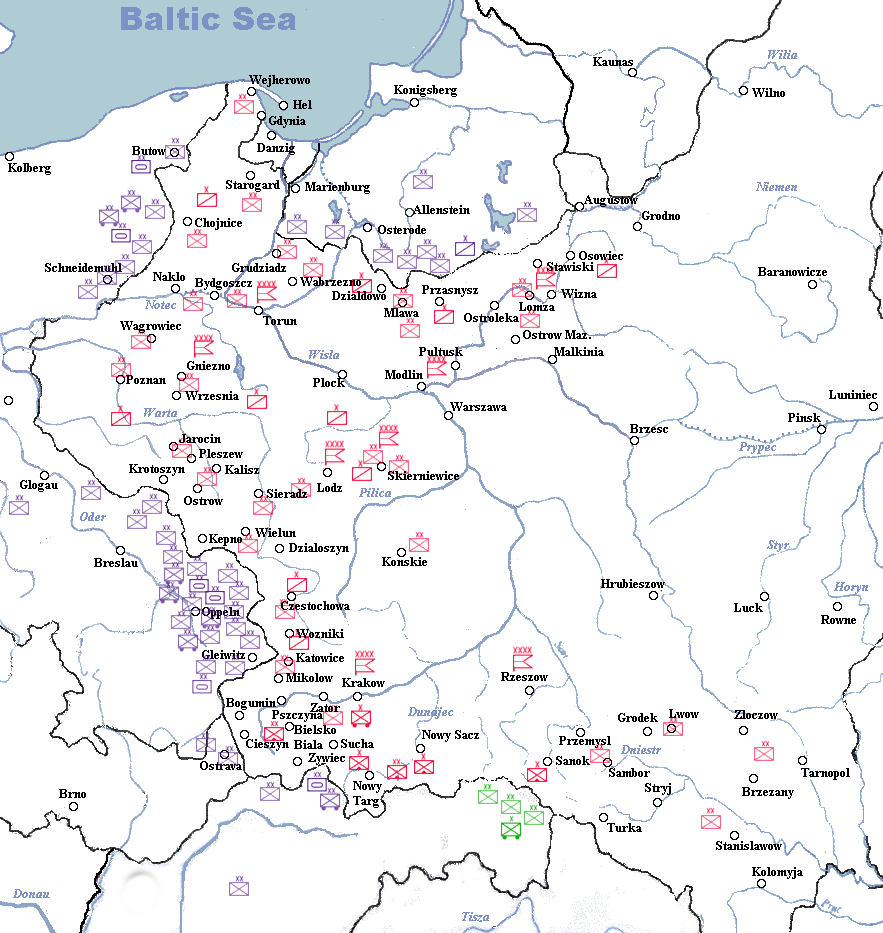
Placement of divisions on September 1, 1939

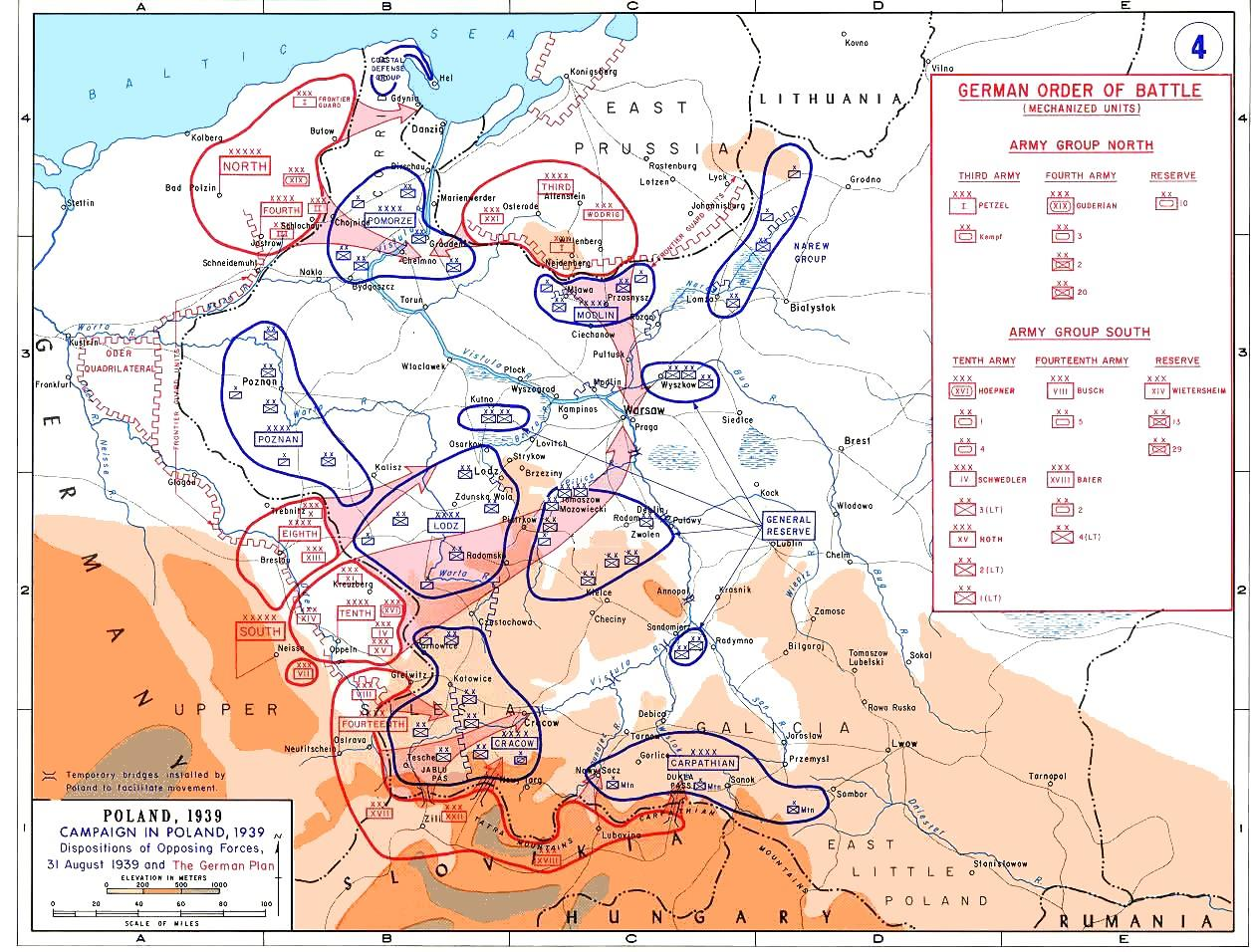
Dispositions of opposing forces, August 31, 1939, and the German plan

== Armies ==
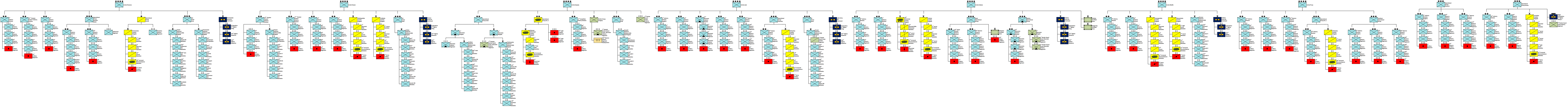
Organization of the Polish Army as of 1st September 1939.

=== Karpaty Army ===
Created on July 11, 1939, under Major General Kazimierz Fabrycy. Armia Karpaty was created after Germany annexed Czechoslovakia and created a puppet state of Slovakia. The main aim of the army was to secure mountain passes in the Carpathians. Initially the army consisted of 2 improvised mountain brigades and a number of smaller units, but later in the course of war was joined by forces of the withdrawing Armia Kraków.

- 2nd Mountain Brigade (2 Brygada Górska), made of National Defence units from Limanowa, Gorlice and Nowy Sącz, as well as Border Defence Corps units from Volhynia,
- 3rd Mountain Brigade (3 Brygada Górska), made of National Defence units from Krosno, Sanok, Przemyśl and Rzeszów
- Carpathian Half-Brigade of National Defence (Karpacka Półbrygada ON)
- 1st Motorized Artillery Regiment
- 9th Heavy Artillery Regiment

Additionally, mobilisation plans called for creation of the Tarnów Group consisting of:

- 22nd Mountain Infantry Division from Przemyśl,
- 38th Infantry Division (reserve), created in August 1939 out of Border Defence Corps units from Polesie Voivodeship and Volhynian Voivodeship.

=== Kraków Army ===
Created on March 23, 1939, as the main pivot of Polish defence. Its main task was to delay advancing German troops and withdraw eastwards along the northern line of the Carpathians. It consisted of 5 infantry divisions, 1 mountain infantry division, 1 motorized cavalry brigade, 1 mountain brigade and 1 cavalry brigade under gen. Antoni Szylling.

Kraków Army	Unit	Polish name	Commander	Remarks
Army units – gen. Antoni Szylling
	6th Infantry Division from Kraków	6 Dywizja Piechoty	Bernard Mond
	7th Infantry Division from Częstochowa	7 Dywizja Piechoty	gen. bryg. Janusz Gąsiorowski
	11th Infantry Division from Stanisławów	11 Dywizja Piechoty	gen. bryg. Bronisław Prugar-Ketling
	Kraków Cavalry Brigade from Kraków	Krakowska Brygada Kawalerii	gen.bryg. Zygmunt Piasecki
	10th Motorized Cavalry Brigade from Rzeszów	10 Brygada Kawalerii Zmotoryzowanej	płk. Stanisław Maczek
Śląsk Operational Group – gen. Jan Jagmin-Sadowski
	23rd Infantry Division from Katowice	23 Dywizja Piechoty	płk. Władysław Powierza	Upper Silesian
	55th Infantry Division, reserve division made of several units from the area of Upper Silesia and Jaworzno	55 Dywizja Piechoty	płk. Stanisław Kalabiński	reserve
Bielsko Operational Group – gen. Mieczysław Boruta-Spiechowicz
	21st Mountain Infantry Division from Nowy Sącz and Bielsko-Biała	21 Dywizja Piechoty Górskiej	gen. Józef Kustroń
	1st Mountain Brigade, made of several National Defence units from Żywiec, Zakopane and Jasło.	1 Brygada Górska	płk. Janusz Gaładyk	mostly elite KOP troops

=== Lublin Army ===
An improvised army created on September 4 from a motorized brigade and various smaller units concentrated around Lublin, Sandomierz and upper Vistula. Commanded by mj. gen. Tadeusz Piskor.

- Warsaw Armoured Motorized Brigade (Warszawska Brygada Pancerno-Motorowa)
- Smaller units

=== Łódź Army ===
Created on March 23, 1939, under gen. Juliusz Rómmel. Armia Łódź was to become a bolt between Armies "Kraków" and "Poznań". However, because of mistakes committed by Gen. Rómmel, the army was located too close to the German border and joined fighting from the very beginning of the campaign, which deprived it of any possibilities of cooperation with the surrounding units. It consisted of 4 infantry divisions and 2 cavalry brigades.

- 2nd Legions Infantry Division (2 Dywizja Piechoty Legionów) from Kielce,
- 10th Infantry Division (10 Dywizja Piechoty) from Łódź,
- 28th Infantry Division (28 Dywizja Piechoty) from Łomża,
- 30th Infantry Division (30 Dywizja Piechoty, reserve division) from Kobryn,
- Kresowa Cavalry Brigade (Kresowa Brygada Kawalerii) from Brody,
- Wołyńska Cavalry Brigade (Wołyńska Brygada Kawalerii) from Rowne,
- Sieradz National Defence Brigade (Sieradzka Brygada Obrony Narodowej)

=== Modlin Army ===
Created on March 23, 1939, for defence of Warsaw from the north. The army was to defend fortified lines along the border with East Prussia near Mława, and then retreat towards Narew river. Led by brig. gen. Emil Krukowicz-Przedrzymirski. Consisted of 2 infantry divisions and 2 cavalry brigades.

- 8th Infantry Division (8 Dywizja Piechoty) from Modlin,
- 20th Infantry Division (20 Dywizja Piechoty) from Baranowicze,
- Nowogródzka Cavalry Brigade (Nowogródzka Brygada Kawalerii) from Baranowicze,
- Mazowiecka Cavalry Brigade (Mazowiecka Brygada Kawalerii) from Warsaw,
- Warsaw National Defence Brigade (Warszawska Brygada Obrony Narodowej)

=== Pomorze Army ===
The Army was created on March 23, 1939, to defend Toruń and Bydgoszcz and to carry out delaying actions in the so-called "Polish Corridor". It was led by Lt.-Gen. Władysław Bortnowski and consisted of five infantry divisions, two National Defence brigades and one cavalry brigade.

Pomorze Army	Unit	Polish name	Commander	Remarks
Army units – gen. Władysław Bortnowski
	9th Infantry Division from Siedlce	9 Dywizja Piechoty	płk. Józef Werobej
	15th Infantry Division from Bydgoszcz	15 Dywizja Piechoty	gen. Wacław Przyjałkowski	Greater Polish
	27th Infantry Division from Kowel	27 Dywizja Piechoty	gen.bryg. Juliusz Drapella
	Pomeranian National Defence Brigade	Pomorska Brygada Obrony Narodowej
	Chełmno National Defence Brigade	Chełmska Brygada Obrony Narodowej
Operational Group "East" – gen. Mikołaj Bołtuć
	4th Infantry Division from Toruń	4 Dywizja Piechoty	płk. Rawicz-Mysłowski, płk. Józef Werobej
	16th Infantry Division from Grudziądz	16 Dywizja Piechoty	płk. Zygmunt Szyszko-Bohusz	Pomeranian
Czersk Operational Group – gen.bryg. Stanisław Grzmot-Skotnicki
	Pomeranian Cavalry Brigade from Bydgoszcz	Pomorska Brygada Kawalerii	gen.bryg. Stanisław Grzmot-Skotnicki
	Independent Units Chojnice and Kościerzyna	Oddziały Wydzielone "Chojnice" i "Kościerzyna"

=== Poznań Army ===
The Armia Poznań led by mj. gen. Tadeusz Kutrzeba was to provide flanking operations in the Grand Poland and withdraw towards lines of defence along the Warta river. It consisted of 4 infantry divisions and 2 cavalry brigades.

- 14th Infantry Division (14 Dywizja Piechoty) from Poznań
- 17th Infantry Division (17 Dywizja Piechoty) from Gniezno
- 25th Infantry Division (25 Dywizja Piechoty) from Kalisz
- 26th Infantry Division (26 Dywizja Piechoty) from Skierniewice
- Wielkopolska Cavalry Brigade (Wielkopolska Brygada Kawalerii) from Poznań,
- Podolska Cavalry Brigade (Podolska Brygada Kawalerii) from Stanisławów.

=== Prusy Army ===
Under gen. Stefan Dąb-Biernacki. Created in the summer of 1939 as the main reserve of the Commander in Chief. According to the "Plan West" (Plan Zachód, code name for the Polish mobilization plan) it was to be composed of units mobilized as the second and third waves and its main purpose was to cooperate with the nearby armies "Poznań" and "Kraków".

Mobilized in two groups. Because of fast German advance both groups entered combat separately and most units did not reach full mobilization. It consisted of 6 infantry divisions, 1 cavalry brigade and a battalion of tanks.

Prusy Army	Unit	Polish name	Commander	Remarks
Army units – gen. Stefan Dąb-Biernacki
	39th Infantry Division, made of several regiments of the Border Defence Corps	39 Dywizja Piechoty	płk. Bruno Olbrycht	reserve
	44th Infantry Division, made of several regiments of the Border Defence Corps	44 Dywizja Piechoty	płk. Eugeniusz Żongołłowicz	reserve
Northern group – gen. Stefan Dąb-Biernacki
	13th Infantry Division from Rowne	13 Dywizja Piechoty	płk. Władysław Zubosz-Kaliński	Kresowa
	19th Infantry Division from Wilno	19 Dywizja Piechoty	gen. Józef Kwaciszewski
	29th Infantry Division from Grodno	29 Dywizja Piechoty	płk. Ignacy Oziewicz
	Wileńska Cavalry Brigade from Wilno	Wileńska Brygada Kawalerii	płk. Konstanty Drucki-Lubecki
	1st tank battalion	1 battalion czołgów
Southern group – gen. Stanisław Skwarczyński
	3rd Legions Infantry Division from Zamość	3 Dywizja Piechoty Legionów	płk. Marian Turowski
	12th Infantry Division from Tarnopol	12 Dywizja Piechoty	gen. Gustaw Paszkiewicz
	36th Infantry Division, made from troops of Border Defence Corps of the Podole area.	36 Dywizja Piechoty	płk Michał Ostrowski	reserve

=== Warsaw Army ===
Created on September 10, 1939, from various units in Warsaw and Modlin Fortress area. Initially it consisted of approximately 25 infantry battalions and 40 tanks. Later it was reinforced by forces of Łódź Army and elements of Modlin Army. It was commanded by col. Walerian Czuma, although the nominal commander was gen. Juliusz Rómmel.

Warsaw Army	Unit	Polish name	Commander	Remarks
Modlin Fortress – gen. Wiktor Thommée
	2nd Legions Infantry Division from Kielce	2 Dywizja Piechoty Legionów	płk Antoni Staich	elements
	8th Infantry Division from Modlin	8 Dywizja Piechoty	płk. Tadeusz Wyrwa-Furgalski	elements
	28th Infantry Division from Warsaw	28 Dywizja Piechoty	płk. Broniewski	elements
	30th Infantry Division from Kobryn	30 Dywizja Piechoty	gen. Leopold Cehak	elements
Western Approach – płk Marian Porwit
	13th Infantry Division from Rowne	13 Dywizja Piechoty	płk. Władysław Zubosz-Kalinski	reinforced
	15th Infantry Division from Bydgoszcz	15 Dywizja Piechoty	gen. Zdzisław Przyjałkowski	reinforced
	25th Infantry Division from Kalisz	25 Dywizja Piechoty	gen. Franciszek Alter	elements
	Combined Cavalry Brigade	Zbiorcza Brygada Kawalerii	gen. Roman Abraham	combined
Eastern Approach – gen. Juliusz Zulauff
	5th Infantry Division from Lwów	5 Dywizja Piechoty	gen. Juliusz Zulauff	elements, 1 regiment
	8th Infantry Division from Modlin	8 Dywizja Piechoty	płk Tadeusz Wyrwa-Furgalski	routed, 1 regiment under Sosabowski
	20th Infantry Division from Baranowicze	20 Dywizja Piechoty	płk Wilhelm Liszka-Lawicz
	44th Infantry Division	44 Dywizja Piechoty	płk. Eugeniusz Żongołłowicz	reserve, routed
	1st "Defenders of Praga" Infantry Regiment	1 pułk piechoty Obrońców Pragi	płk. Stanisław Milian	improvised
	2nd "Defenders of Praga" Infantry Regiment	2 pułk piechoty Obrońców Pragi	płk. Stefan Kotowski	improvised

== Operational Groups ==
=== Operational Group Wyszków ===
Was one of the reserves of the northern front of Polish defences, created on September 1, 1939. According to Plan West, it was supposed to defend the line of the Narew river from Wehrmacht units advancing from East Prussia. Due to rapid German advance, the group withdrew towards the Bug river, and on September 11, Polish Commander in Chief Edward Rydz-Śmigły ordered General Wincenty Kowalski, commandant of Operational Group Wyszków, to merge his unit with Northern Front under General Stefan Dąb-Biernacki.

It consisted of the following units:

- 1st Legions Infantry Division (Poland) (1 Dywizja Piechoty Legionów) from Wilno,
- 35th Infantry Division (35 Dywizja Piechoty – reserve), formed on September 7, 1939, out of units of the Border Defence Corps from northern parts of the Wilno Voivodeship,
- 41st Infantry Division (41 Dywizja Piechoty – reserve), formed in September 1939, out of units of the Border Defence Corps,
- Bartosz Glowacki (armoured train),
- elements of 2nd Regiment of Heavy Artillery.

=== Independent Operational Group Narew ===
Consisted of 2 infantry divisions and 2 cavalry brigades:

- 18th Infantry Division (Polish: 18 Dywizja Piechoty) from Łomża,
- 33rd Infantry Division (Polish: 33 Dywizja Piechoty – reserve), formed in late August 1939, out of Border Defence Corps units from the areas of Grodno and Wilno,
- Podlaska Cavalry Brigade (Polish: Podlaska Brygada Kawalerii) from Białystok,
- Suwalska Cavalry Brigade (Polish: Suwalska Brygada Kawalerii) from Suwałki and Grodno.

== Supporting forces ==
Air support

- Lotnictwo Wojskowe (Polish Air Force)

Naval and river support

- Polska Marynarka Wojenna (Polish Navy)

== See also ==
- Polish cavalry brigade order of battle
- Border Guard
- Fall Weiss
- History of Poland
- List of Polish armies in World War II
- Polish armaments 1939–45
