= Battle of Tomaszów Lubelski =

1939 battle in Poland

- Part of Invasion of Poland
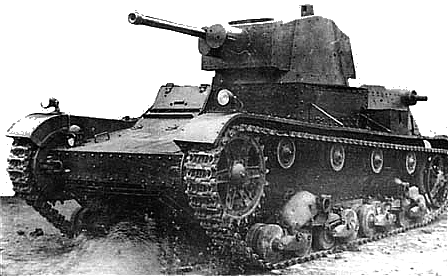
- A Polish 7TP tank; 22 of these tanks participated in the battle.
Date	17–26 September 1939
Location	Near Tomaszów Lubelski, Lublin Voivodeship, Poland 50°27′00″N 23°25′00″E
Result	German victory

Belligerents
Germany	Poland

Commanders and leaders
Leonard Wecker; Wilhelm List; Walther von Reichenau; Ewald von Kleist; Ernst Busch	First Phase: Antoni Szylling; Tadeusz Piskor Second Phase: Stefan Dąb-Biernacki; Emil Krukowicz-Przedrzymirski; Władysław Anders; Jan Kruszewski

Strength
3 infantry divisions 2 panzer divisions	First Phase: 4 infantry divisions 1 cavalry brigade 1 mechanised brigade

Casualties and losses
929 killed 1,174 wounded 36 tanks destroyed	870 killed 700 wounded

The Battle of Tomaszów Lubelski took place from 18 September to 20 September 1939 near the town of Tomaszów Lubelski. It was the second largest battle of the invasion of Poland (the Battle of Bzura was the largest) and also the largest tank battle of the campaign. It resulted in the surrender of Army Krakow on 20 September 1939.

The battle can be divided into two phases - from 19 to 20 September and from 21 to 26 September. They are often referred to in French sources as the First and Second battle of Tomaszów, respectively.

== First phase ==
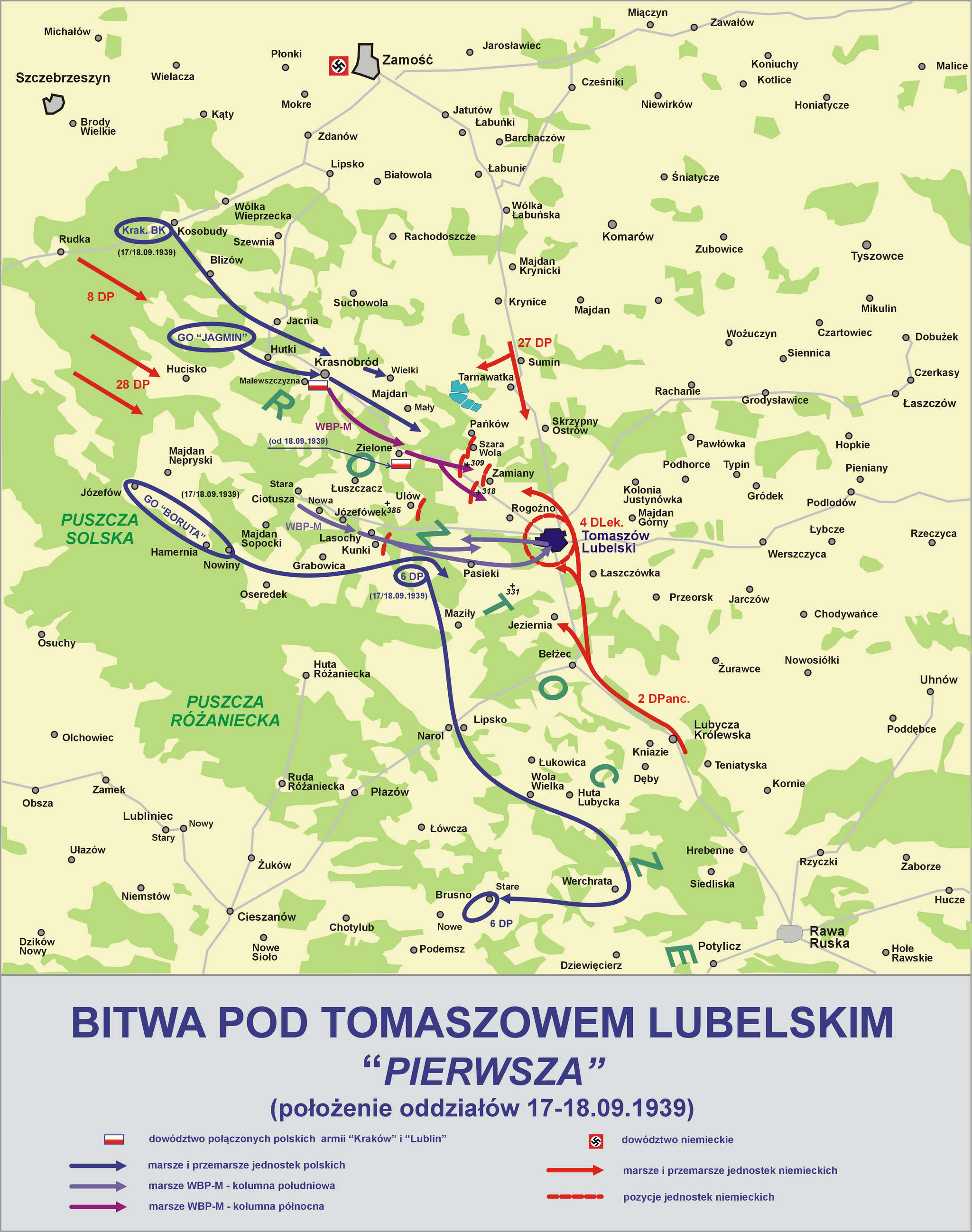
Map of the first phase by Lonio17

In the first phase (also known as the First Battle of Tomaszów Lubelski), Polish forces, composed of Army Lublin and Army Krakow under general Piskor attempted to break through the German positions around Tomaszów towards the Romanian Bridgehead area. Both armies forces on 15 September in the area southwest of Frampol. Their road towards south was blocked, however, by two German corps - VIII Army Corps (around Biłgoraj), and by XXII Panzer Corps, consisting of 2nd Panzer Division and 4th Light Division (around Hrubieszów, Zamość and Tomaszów Lubelski). Polish forces, concentrated around Frampol, were surrounded by six to seven German divisions. Since neither Army Kraków, nor Army Lublin had any aircraft, general Antoni Szylling, commander of Army Kraków, decided to risk and attack the Germans, without knowing their real strength. He knew that Panzer forces had already approached Rawa Ruska, and hoped that their units would be stretched along the road from Jarosław to Rawa. Polish forces included one of the largest Polish armored units of that time, the Warsaw Armoured Motorized Brigade, and Szyling, together with general Piskor, decided that the Warsaw Brigade would make a demonstration attack on Tomaszów, drawing the attention of the Germans. Joined Polish forces were made of five infantry divisions - 3rd, 21st, 22nd, 23rd, and 55th. Furthermore, they consisted of 1st Mountain Brigade, Kraków Cavalry Brigade, and Warsaw Armoured Motorized Brigade. However, after days of heavy fighting, Polish units were reduced to 30-50% of their original strength (except for the Armoured Brigade), lacking batteries, antitank ammunition and controllers. Furthermore, communication between separate divisions was strong, and they had no lots of support, which was a huge advantage, as they had an idea about movements and location of German forces.

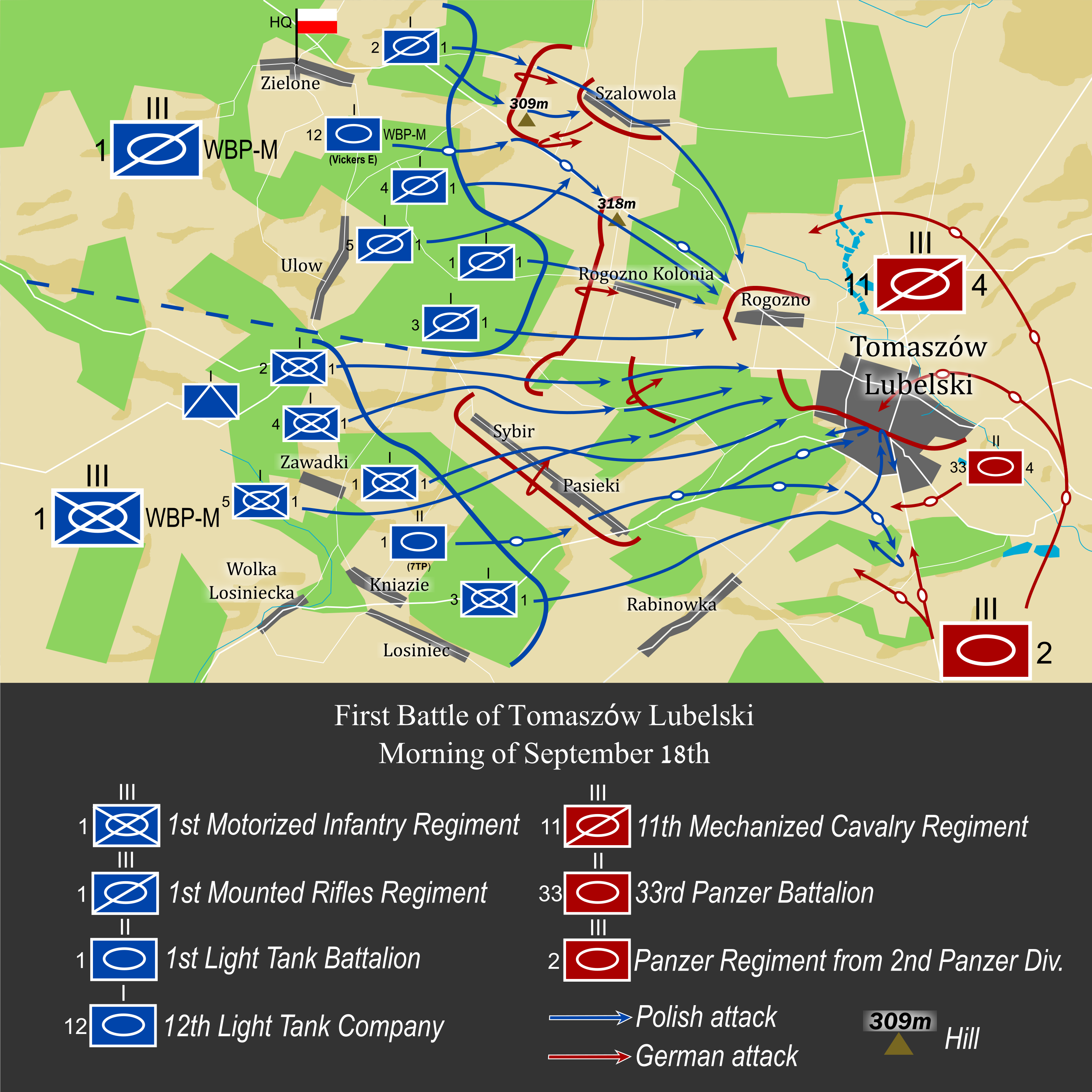
Polish tank assault, 18 September

These plans, however, were quickly changed, after the Germans destroyed key Polish unit, 21st Mountain Division near the village of Dzikowiec, on 15-16 September, killing general Józef Kustroń. General Piskor, realizing that German forces were stronger than he had thought, decided to act quickly, without waiting for all his divisions to concentrate. On 17 September he ordered Warsaw Armoured Motorized Brigade to attack Tomaszów and keep the town until main forces of Army Kraków joined the brigade. Tomaszów was attacked on 18 September in the morning, and by 1 p.m. half of the town was in Polish hands. Meanwhile, however, 4th Light Division joined the battle, striking rear Polish units and forcing them to withdraw. Thus, the attempt to capture Tomaszów in a surprise attack, failed. On the night of 18-19 September Warsaw Brigade, supported by infantry of 23rd and 55th divisions, attacked Tomaszów again, but without success. Third attack took place in the night of 19-20 September but Polish units were disorganized and demoralized. After a series of chaotic skirmishes, with number of killed and wounded growing, and ammunition shrinking, general Piskor decided to surrender. Some 11,000 Polish soldiers were captured, with small groups managing to hide in forests.

Meanwhile, Operational Group "Boruta" (named after General Mieczysław Boruta-Spiechowicz), which was part of Army Kraków, separated from main Polish forces and marched towards Narol. Surrounded by Germans, Polish units were destroyed one by one. Some managed to reach the area of Rawa Ruska, where 3,000 soldiers surrendered on 20 September, ending this phase of the battle.

== Second phase ==
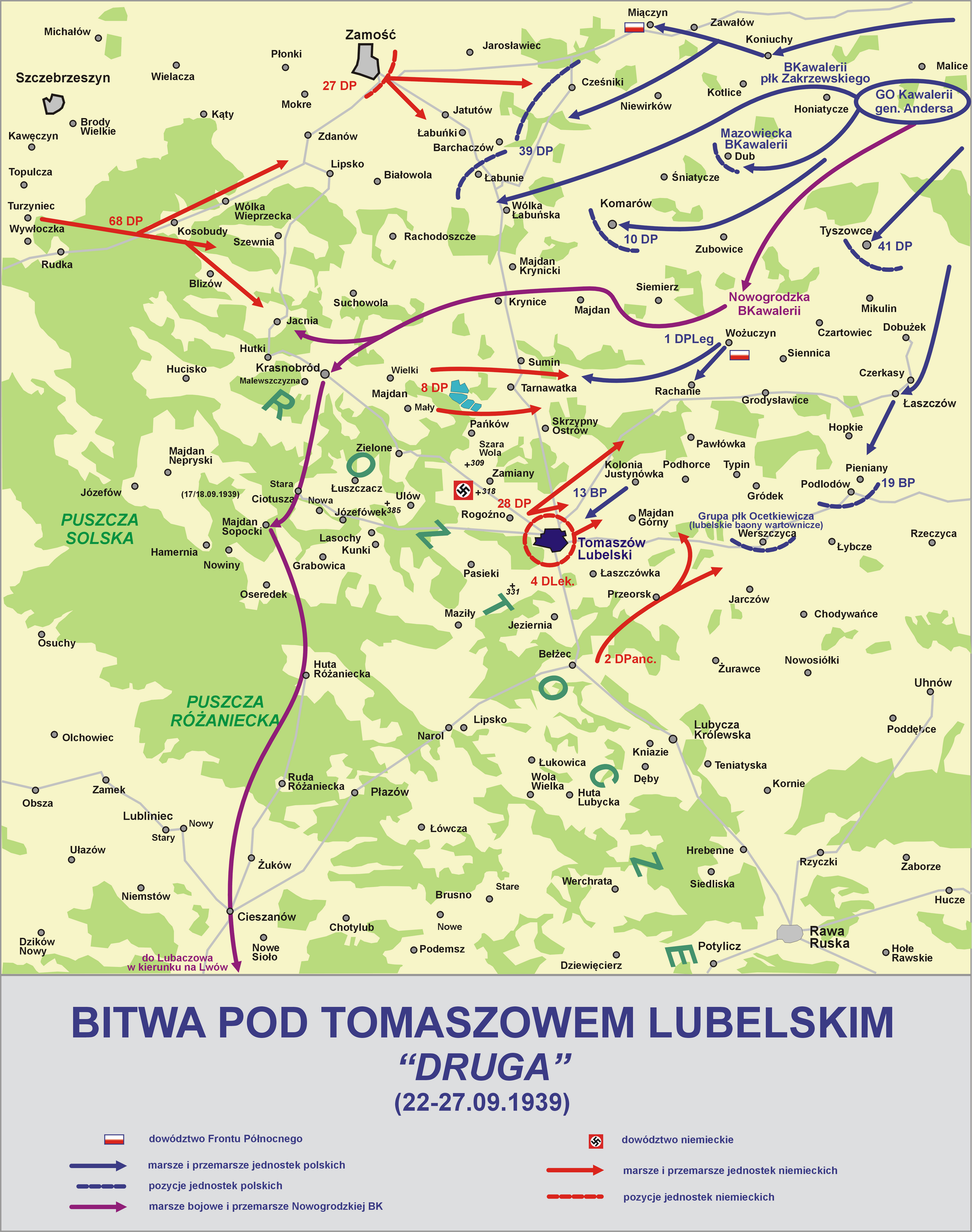
Map of the second phase by Lonio17

The second phase (also known as the Second Battle of Tomaszów Lubelski) involved Polish units from the so-called Northern Front - remaining elements of Army Lublin, Army Modlin and Operational Groups Wyszków, Narew and Nowogródzka Cavalry Brigade under generals Emil Krukowicz-Przedrzymirski and Stefan Dąb-Biernacki. On 20 September these forces were some 40 kilometers north of Tomaszów, in the area of Sitaniec. General Dąb-Biernacki, who commanded them, until the final hours had no idea about the ongoing battle and did not help fighting troops. At the same time, general Piskor did not know about Dąb-Biernacki's units operating northeast of Tomaszów. Altogether, forces of Northern Front had 39,000 soldiers and 225 cannons. They were divided into three groups - Cavalry of general Władysław Anders, Operational Group of general Jan Kruszewski, and Operational Group of general Emil Krukowicz-Przedrzymirski. Polish forces were no match to German 10th Army and 14th Army, guarding the roads to the south, but general Dąb-Biernacki, at a meeting of his officers on 18 September in the village of Wereszcze Duże near Chełm, decided to go along with an attempt to break to Hungary or Romania. Dąb-Biernacki already knew that the Red Army had invaded Poland the day before, so time was of crucial importance.

Northern Front forces marched southwards from the area of Chełm in two columns, towards Zamość, which Dąb-Biernacki decided to attack. On 18 September Poles attacked Krasnystaw, but failed to capture it. On next day, Dąb-Biernacki ordered the attack on Zamość to be carried out on 20 September but on the night of 19-20 September he found out about the ongoing battle of Tomaszów Lubelski and decided to help. Northern Front units headed towards Tomaszów, but on 20 September, in the evening, they were attacked by 4th Light Division and 27th Infantry Division near Cześniki. Meanwhile, units of Operational Group of general Emil Krukowicz-Przedrzymirski reached the area of Tomaszów, and on 21 September, a few hours the first phase of the battle had ended, attacked troops under command of general Ernst Busch (28th Jäger Division and 8th Jäger Division). Since Polish forces proved to be stronger than expected, field marshal Wilhelm List decided to send reinforcements to general Busch - 68th Infantry Division, 27th I.D., and 2nd Panzer Division, which had just mopped Polish forces in the first phase of the battle of Tomaszów Lubelski.

In the evening of 22 September cavalry of general Władysław Anders attacked, capturing Krasnystaw, and then reaching Sambor. Other Polish units were not successful, and in several skirmishes were surrounded on 23 September. General Dąb-Biernacki ordered his officers to capitulate, escaped the encirclement, and left Poland, ending up in France. General Przedrzymirski refused to obey the order, and on 24 September attacked Krasnobród, but then was stopped by 8th Jager Division. Most of the remaining Polish forces capitulated around 26 September.

== Order of Battle ==
Polish First Phase
	Groups	Division or Brigade	Regiments
Army Lublin Piskor
Army Lublin Piskor		Warsaw Armoured Motorized Brigade; Rowecki	1st Motorized Infantry Regiment; 1st Mounted Rifles Regiment elements of 1st Light Tank Battalion and other small armoured units
Army Lublin Piskor		Sandomierz Group; Sikorski	94th Infantry Regiment; 164th Infantry Regiment
Army Kraków Szyling	Operational Group Jagmin Jagmin-Sadowski		
Army Kraków Szyling	Operational Group Jagmin Jagmin-Sadowski	23rd Infantry Division; Powierza	11th Infantry Regiment; 73rd Infantry Regiment; 75th Infantry Regiment
Army Kraków Szyling	Operational Group Jagmin Jagmin-Sadowski	55th Infantry Division; Kalabiński	201st Infantry Regiment; 203rd Infantry Regiment; 204th Infantry Regiment
Army Kraków Szyling	Operational Group Jagmin Jagmin-Sadowski	22nd Mountain Infantry Division; Endel-Ragis	2nd Podhale Rifles Regiment; 5th Podhale Rifles Regiment; 6th Podhale Rifles Regiment
Army Kraków Szyling	Operational Group Boruta Boruta-Spiechowicz	6th Infantry Division; Mond	12th Infantry Regiment; 16th Infantry Regiment; 20th Infantry Regiment
Army Kraków Szyling	Operational Group Boruta Boruta-Spiechowicz	21st Mountain Infantry Division; Kustroń	202nd Infantry Regiment; 3rd Podhale Rifles Regiment; 4th Podhale Rifles Regiment
Army Kraków Szyling		Kraków Cavalry Brigade; Piasecki	3rd Uhlan Regiment; 5th Mounted Rifles Regiment; 8th Uhlan Regiment

Polish Second Phase
	Groups	Division or Brigade	Regiments
Northern Front Dąb-Biernacki
Northern Front Dąb-Biernacki		39th Infantry Division; Olbrycht	93rd Infantry Regiment; 94th Infantry Regiment; 95th Infantry Regiment
Northern Front Dąb-Biernacki	Operational Group Przedrzymirski Krukowicz-Przedrzymirski	1st Legions Infantry Division; Kowalski	1st Legions Infantry Regiment; 5th Legions Infantry Regiment; 6th Legions Infantry Regiment elements of 3rd Legions Infantry Division
Northern Front Dąb-Biernacki	Operational Group Przedrzymirski Krukowicz-Przedrzymirski	33rd Infantry Division; Zieleniewski	133rd Infantry Regiment; 134 Infantry Regiment; 135 Infantry Regiment
Northern Front Dąb-Biernacki	Operational Group Przedrzymirski Krukowicz-Przedrzymirski	41st Infantry Division; Piekarski	114th Infantry Regiment; 115 Infantry Regiment; 116 Infantry Regiment
Northern Front Dąb-Biernacki	Operational Group Przedrzymirski Krukowicz-Przedrzymirski	Mazowiecka Cavalry Brigade; Karcz	1st Chevau-légers Regiment; 7th Uhlan Regiment; 11th Legions Uhlan Regiment
Northern Front Dąb-Biernacki	Cavalry Operational Group Anders Anders		
Northern Front Dąb-Biernacki	Cavalry Operational Group Anders Anders	Nowogródzka Cavalry Brigade; Plisowski	25th Uhlan Regiment; 26th Uhlan Regiment; 27th Uhlan Regiment
Northern Front Dąb-Biernacki	Cavalry Operational Group Anders Anders	Wołyńska Cavalry Brigade; Filipowicz	12th Uhlan Regiment; 19th Uhlan Regiment; 21st Uhlan Regiment
Northern Front Dąb-Biernacki	Cavalry Operational Group Anders Anders	Kresowa Cavalry Brigade; Grobicki	6th Mounted Rifles Regiment; 20th Uhlan Regiment; 22nd Uhlan Regiment
Northern Front Dąb-Biernacki	Operational Group Kruszewski Kruszewski	10th Infantry Division; Dindorf-Ankowicz	28th Infantry Regiment; 30th Infantry Regiment; 31st Infantry Regiment
Northern Front Dąb-Biernacki	Operational Group Kruszewski Kruszewski	Combined Infantry Division; Wołkowicki	13th Infantry Brigade; 19th Infantry Brigade elements of 29th Infantry Brigade
Northern Front Dąb-Biernacki	Operational Group Kruszewski Kruszewski	Combined Cavalry Brigade; Zakrzewski	Warsaw Cavalry Regiment elements of Wileńska Cavalry Brigade; 8th Uhlan Regiment

German
	Groups	Division or Brigade	Regiments
10th Army Reichenau	VII Corps Schobert	27th Infantry Division; Bergmann	40th Infantry Regiment; 63rd Infantry Regiment; 91st Infantry Regiment
10th Army Reichenau	VII Corps Schobert	68th Infantry Division; Braun	169th Infantry Regiment; 188th Infantry Regiment; 196th Infantry Regiment
14th Army List	VIII Corps Busch	8th Infantry Division; Koch-Erpach	28th Infantry Regiment; 38th Infantry Regiment; 84th Infantry Regiment
14th Army List	VIII Corps Busch	28th Infantry Division; Obstfelder	7th Infantry Regiment; 49th Infantry Regiment; 83rd Infantry Regiment
14th Army List	XXII Corps Kleist		
14th Army List	XXII Corps Kleist	2nd Panzer Division; Veiel	3rd Panzer Regiment; 4th Panzer Regiment; 2nd Motorized Infantry Regiment
14th Army List	XXII Corps Kleist	4th Light Division; Hubicki	33rd Panzer Battalion; 10th Mechanized Cavalry Regiment; 11th Mechanized Cavalry Regiment
14th Army List	XVII Corps Kienitz	44th Infantry Division; Schubert	131st Infantry Regiment; 132nd Infantry Regiment; 134th Infantry Regiment
14th Army List	XVII Corps Kienitz	45th Infantry Division; Materna	130th Infantry Regiment; 133rd Infantry Regiment; 135th Infantry Regiment

== See also ==
- List of World War II military equipment of Poland
- List of German military equipment of World War II
