= Antoni Szylling =

Polish general (1884–1971)

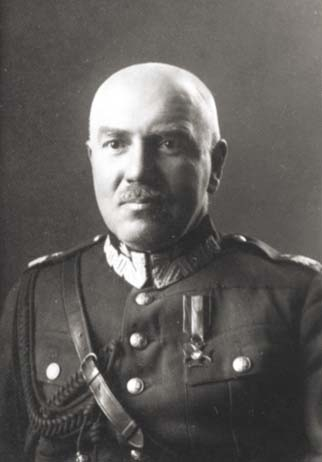
- Born: 31 August 1884; Płoniawy-Bramura, Łomża Governorate, Russian Empire
- Died: 17 June 1971 (aged 86); Montreal, Quebec, Canada
- Military career
- Service years: 1914–1939
- Rank: Generał dywizji
- Units: 28th Infantry Division, 23rd Infantry Division, 8th Infantry Division, and Army Kraków
- Conflicts: World War I; Polish–Soviet War; World War II; Invasion of Poland
- Awards: Virtuti Militari (IV Class) Virtuti Militari (V Class) Polonia Restituta (III Class) Polonia Restituta (IV Class) Cross of the Valorous (three times) Golden Cross of Merit

Antoni Szylling (31 August 1884 – 17 June 1971) was a Polish general, considered, along with Generals Wiktor Thommée and Stanisław Maczek, to have been one of the most successful Polish Armed Forces commanders during the Invasion of Poland of 1939.

== Biography ==
Antoni Szyling was born in Płoniawy-Bramura. He finished a 7-year trade school in 1904 and from an early age was an active member of the Polish pro-independence nationalist paramilitary organization the Combat Organization of the Polish Socialist Party. He had several safehouses, in which he stored bibuła and arms, as well as hiding wanted PPS members and members of other organizations. Arrested by the authorities of the Russian Empire, he served several one-and-a-half-month sentences in the Warsaw Citadel and Daniłłiczowski Prison. He was also denied the right to study at a university and was conscripted into the Russian Army for two years (1905–1907). In 1910, he married Zofia Bajkowski (1887–1944). In the years 1909–1912 he was able to finish 'industrial-agricultural courses' at the Higher Agricultural School in Warsaw, and from 1912 to 1913 he worked on an experimental folwark in Szamocin. In 1914 he was mobilized into the Russian Army again and fought in the First World War.

In 1917, with the rank of captain, he joined the Polish 2nd Corps in the East. In 1918 he was promoted to major, and soon afterwards taken prisoner by the Germans. In January 1919 he joined the Polish Army. During the Polish-Soviet War he commanded the 44th Infantry Regiment. In 1922 he was promoted to colonel and later retired at his own request. In 1925 he was commissioned again and became the commander of the 28th Infantry Division in Warsaw. Later he commanded the 23rd Infantry Division in Katowice and the 8th Infantry Division in Modlin. In 1929 he was promoted to the rank of brigadier general (generał brygady). In May 1937 he worked at the General Inspectorate of the Armed Forces in Silesia.

During the German attack on Poland (1939) that started World War II he commanded Army Kraków. This army was the main pivot of Polish defence. Its main task was to delay advancing German troops and withdraw eastwards along the northern line of the Carpathians and defend the heavily industrialized Upper Silesia region. It consisted of four infantry divisions (6th, 7th, 23rd and 55th), two mountain infantry divisions (21st and 22nd), one mountain brigade and two cavalry brigades: one motorized (10th) and one standard (Kraków). It was the most southwestern of the Polish Armies, with Army Łódź to its north and Army Karpaty to its southeast.

During the early stages of the Battle of the Border the northern Army Łódź was partially surrounded by quickly advancing German forces. Army Kraków, attacked by the German 14th Army under the command of General Wilhelm List, was forced to retreat to protect its flanks from 2 September onwards. A careful tactician, General Szylling followed the strategy of 'retreat to fight another day' instead of engaging the superior enemy. General Szylling, despite the increasingly difficult situation for the Polish forces, was able to retreat successfully towards the city of Lublin, following his orders and avoiding several German attempts to surround him. On 19 September Szyling's forces joined with Army Lublin of General Tadeusz Piskor in the Battle of Tomaszów Lubelski, the second largest tank battle of the campaign. Polish forces followed the plan of General Piskor, but the German defences proved too strong and the majority of Polish forces, including the headquarters of both generals, were encircled and surrendered on 20 September.

Hence General Szylling became a German prisoner for the second time. He spent most of the war in the Oflag VII-A Murnau POW camp. On 30 April 1945 he was freed by advancing American forces; he decided not to return to Polish Communist-controlled Poland, but emigrated to France and later to the United Kingdom and, finally, to Canada (in 1947). In 1949 he married Maria Róża Dobrowolska (1896–1986). He lived on a farm at Abercorn, near Montreal, where he died on 17 June 1971. He is buried in Saint-Sauveur, Quebec. He actually died at the Maria (Curie) Sklodowski Polish Home for the Aged on Belanger Street in Montreal.

After emigrating he wrote a monograph, Moje dowodzenie we wrześniu 1939 ("My command in September 1939"). The original was given to Antoni Borejsza-Wysocki (1918–2000) to be published at a later date. It was published in Kraków in 2007 - with some minor changes and additions unbeknownst to the author.

In 1946 the Polish government promoted him to generał dywizji in recognition of his valor.

== Honours and awards ==
- Gold Cross of the Order of Virtuti Militari, previously awarded the Silver Cross
- Commander's Cross of the Order of Polonia Restituta, previously awarded the Officer's Cross
- Cross of Valour - three times
- Gold Cross of Merit
