= Stefan Rowecki "Grot" Memorial =

Monument in Warsaw, Poland

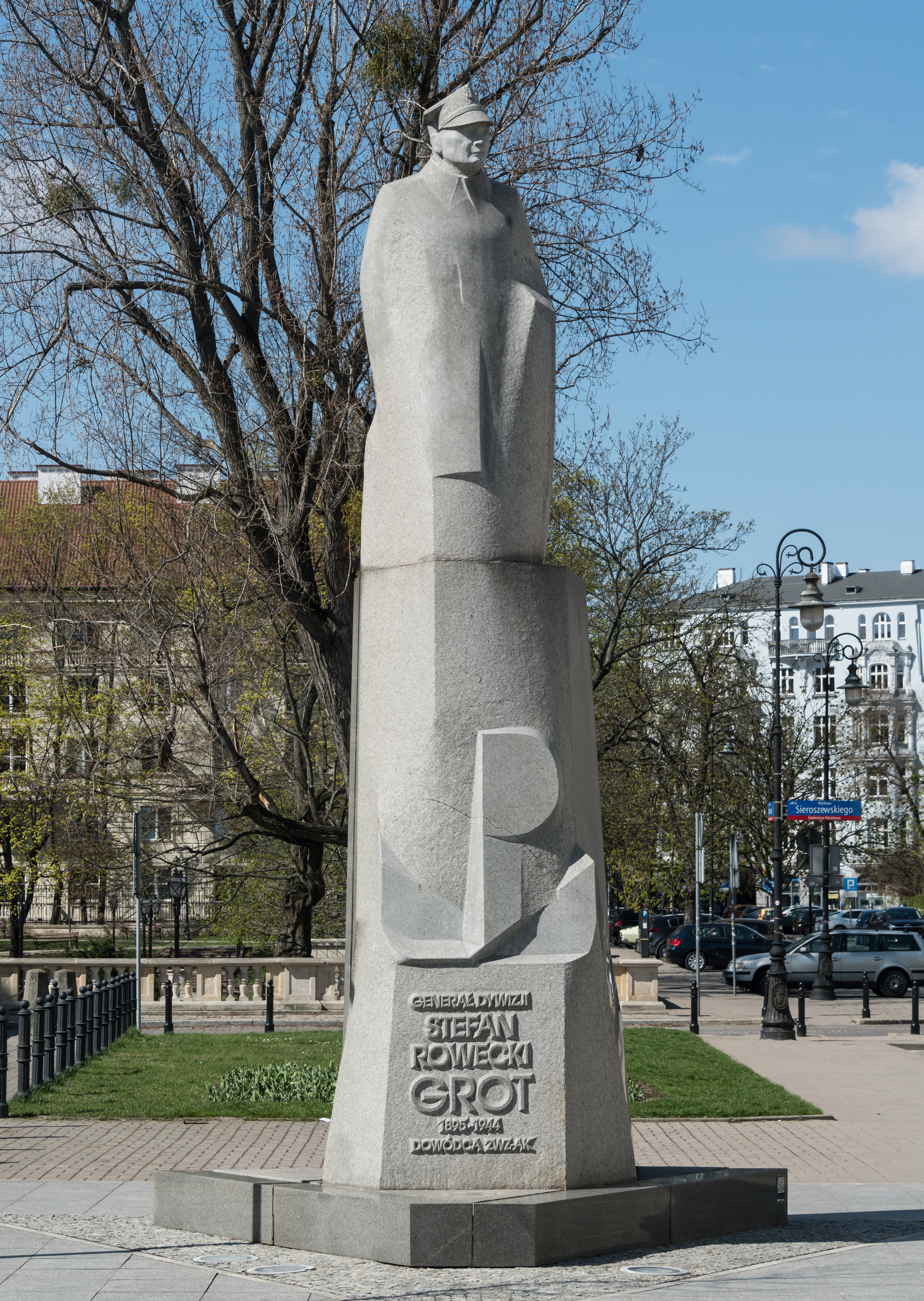
- The sculpture in 2022.
- Interactive map of Stefan Rowecki "Grot" Memorial
- Location: Chopina Street, Downtown, Warsaw, Poland
- Coordinates: 52°13′21.94″N 21°01′25.45″E
- Designer: Zbigniew Mikielewicz
- Type: Sculpture
- Material: Granite
- Height: 6.3 m (21 ft)
- Weight: 30 t (66,000 lb; 30,000 kg)
- Opening date: 5 June 2005
- Dedicated to: Stefan Rowecki

The Stefan Rowecki "Grot" Memorial (Polish: Pomnik Stefana Roweckiego „Grota”) is a minimalist granite sculpture in Warsaw, Poland, placed at the corner of Ujazdów Avenue and Chopina Street, within the South Downtown neighbourhood. It is dedicated to Stefan Rowecki, the commander-in-chief of the Home Army during the Second World War. The monument was made by Zbigniew Mikielewicz and unveiled on 11 June 2005.

== History ==
The project was chosen in a 2004 contest for the monument design organised by the Association of Polish Architects. It was submitted by team of sculptor Zbigniew Mikielewicz, and architect Przemysław Dudziuk, with assistance from Justyna Goździewicz. It was unveiled on 11 June 2005.

== Design ==
The minimalist granite monument has the height of 6.3 m and weights approximately 30 tons. It consists of a 3-metre-tall sculpture of Stefan Rowecki, wearing a trench coat and rogatywka hat. The pedestal features a sculpture of the Anchor, the symbol of the Home Army in form of the letters P and W placed in a column, and standing for motto Polska Walcząca (Fighting Poland). It also bears the following inscription:

Polish inspiration:
Generał dywizji
Stefan
Rowecki
Grot
1895–1944
Dowódca ZWS-AK

English translation:
Division general
Stefan
Rowecki
Grot
1895–1944
Commander of the Home Army Major Command
