= Warsaw Armoured Motorized Brigade =

- Active: 1939
- Country: Poland
- Branch: Land forces
- Type: Armoured
- Size: ~30 tanks and tankettes
- Engagements: Battle of Tomaszów Lubelski

Commanders
- Notable commanders: Stefan Rowecki

The Warsaw Armoured Motorized Brigade (Polish: Warszawska Brygada Pancerno-Motorowa, WBP-M, WBPanc-Mot) was a motorized unit of the Polish Army during the interbellum period. The brigade was one of two such units in Poland (the other being the 10th Motorized Cavalry Brigade (Poland); several more were planned). Not fully formed by September 1, it was nonetheless partially combat ready and immediately rushed into battle during the Polish September Campaign. Following heavy losses during the Battle of Tomaszów Lubelski, it was disbanded on September 20, 1939.

== History ==
The Brigade was formed in early June 1939, when the Polish Minister of Military Affairs, General Tadeusz Kasprzycki, gave order to transform the 1st Regiment of Mounted Rifles from the Garwolin garrison into a motorized unit. On June 10, 1939, Colonel Stefan Rowecki was appointed brigade commander (later, under the pseudonym "Grot" (spearhead), he became the first commander of the Home Army, and was killed by the Germans). The new unit was also based on other regiments, such as the 1st Rifle Regiment from Rembertów, the sapper battalion from Puławy and the 2nd Motorised Artillery Battalion from Stryj (8×75mm guns), which joined it on September 6.

The unit was equipped with Polish-made TKS tankettes (13 tankettes, 2 of them with 20mm guns, 11th Recce Tank Company), and British-made Vickers E light tanks (17 machines, 12th Light Tank Company). The tankettes (except for the tankettes equipped with 20mm AT MG 38FK), were no match for even the PzKpfw II on the German side, and the Vickers E were outclassed by PzKpfw III and PzKpfw IV.

On September 1, 1939, the Brigade left the barracks and concentrated its forces around Garwolin. It stayed there until September 3 as a reserve of the Commander-in-Chief of the Polish Army, then was ordered to prepare the defence of the Vistula river line between Dęblin and Solec. On September 5, it became part of freshly created Army Lublin, under General Tadeusz Piskor. The first contact with the enemy took place on September 8: the Brigade delayed the German advance and covered the retreat of the Polish forces. In the course of time, it absorbed remains of other Polish armoured units.

On September 10 Brigade's positions were attacked by the 4th and 14th Infantry Divisions of the Wehrmacht. The Poles defended themselves, three days later counterattacked and the Germans retreated towards the Vistula river. However, the Polish offensive was stopped by the Army Headquarters and the Brigade began withdrawal towards Lwów (Lviv). On September 15, Rowecki ordered to destroy all unnecessary equipment and divided the Brigade into two columns.

On September 16, the Brigade, together with other Polish units, was surrounded in the area of Tomaszów Lubelski (see: Battle of Tomaszów Lubelski). The Polish forces decided to attack the town of Tomaszów Lubelski; the offensive was carried out in the morning of September 17 by Warsaw Armoured Motorized Brigade, which managed to catch the German XXII Corps by surprise. However, the Germans quickly organized a defence and the Polish attack failed, with the Brigade losing half of the equipment. On September 19, another Polish attack did not succeed, and one day later, after fierce fighting and destruction of large part of equipment, General Piskor decided to surrender. Rowecki ordered the destruction of remaining heavy equipment and all soldiers to try to break through the German encirclement on his own. He himself was not caught by the Germans, also hundreds of Brigade's soldiers managed to escape to Hungary and later to Great Britain, where they joined the Polish 1st Armoured Division of General Stanisław Maczek.

== See also ==
- Polish army order of battle in 1939
- Polish contribution to World War II

== Sources ==
- Rajmund Szubanski: "Polska bron pancerna 1939"; Warszawa 1989 (in Polish)
- Waclaw Zaleski: "W Warszawskiej Brygadzie Pancerno-Motorowej 1939", Warszawa 1988 (in Polish)
- http://www.wojsko18-39.internetdsl.pl/wrzesien/strona3.htm (in Polish)
- http://derela.pl/brigades.htm#wbpm (in English)
- http://www.wojsko-polskie.pl/wortal/document,,id,1536,pageNo,14.html (in Polish)
