= Southern Front =

Southern Front may refer to:

- Southern Front (RSFSR), a formation of the Red Army during the Russian Civil War (1918–20)
- Southern Front (Soviet Union), a formation of the Soviet Red Army in World War II
- Southern Front (Sudan), a Sudanese political party
- Southern Front (Syrian rebel group)
- Polish Southern Front, a formation of the Polish Army during the Invasion of Poland of 1939
- Franco-Turkish War, 1918–21 war during the Turkish War of Independence
- Italian campaign (World War II), 1943–45
