= Polish Southern Front =

One of the Polish fronts during the Invasion of Poland of 1939

The Southern Front (Polish Front Południowy) was one of two fronts of the Polish Army created during the Invasion of Poland of 1939 against the allied forces of Nazi Germany and Soviet Union. It was established on September 12 out of the Polish Armies Karpaty and Kraków, as well as several military units created behind the front-lines.

Its commander was Gen. Kazimierz Sosnkowski, who was ordered by the Commander in Chief Edward Rydz-Śmigły to organize the Polish defence in the area of Lesser Poland and Volhynia and to prepare a last stand for the Polish defence in the so-called Romanian Bridgehead. Created too late to be able to change the fate of the war, the front was never established as a single entity and the entry of the Soviet Union on the side of Nazi Germany to the war against Poland made the plans for the front's creation obsolete.

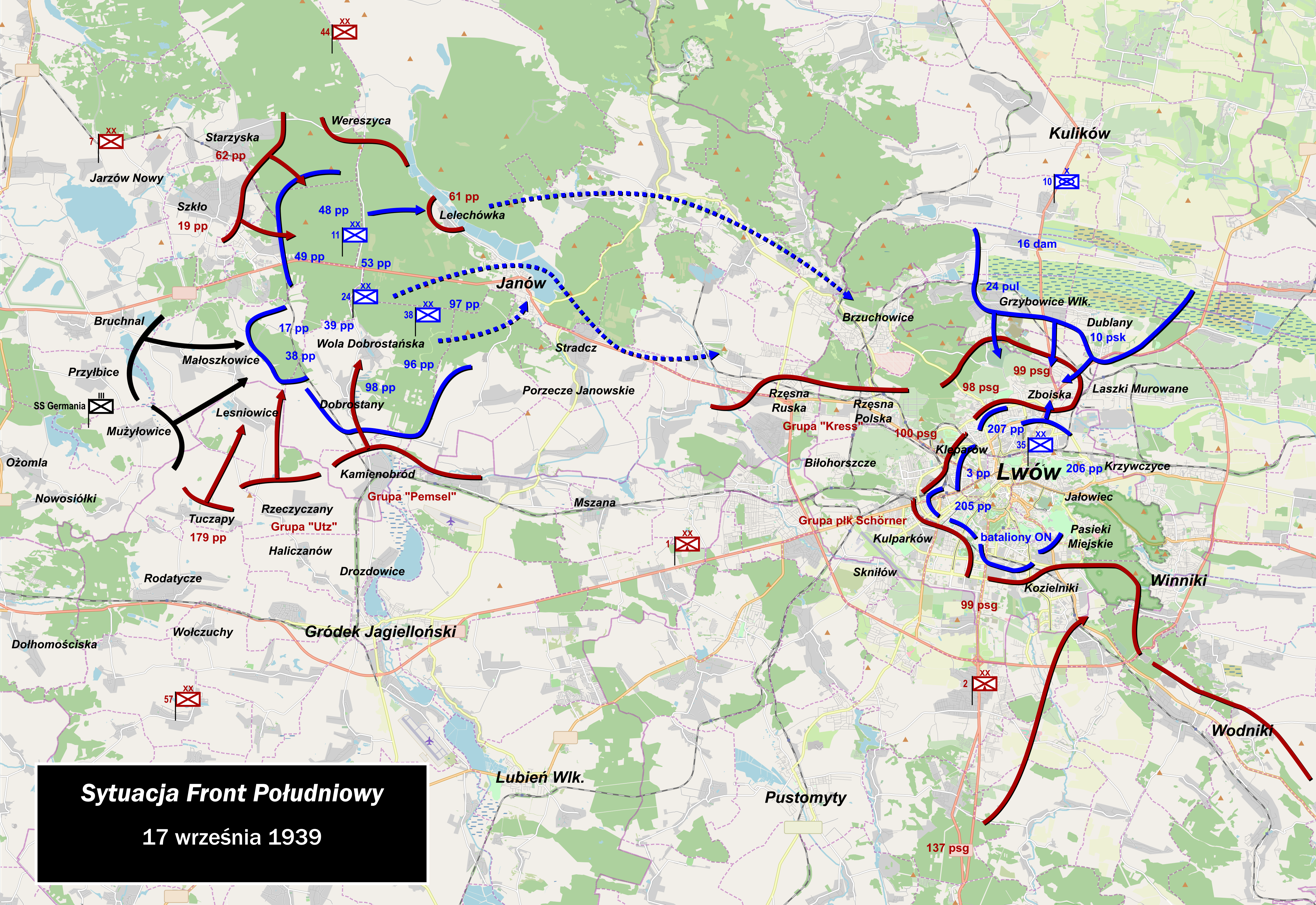
Situation of the Polish Southern Front near the Lwow region, September 17 1939

On September 13, 1939, Gen. Kazimierz Sosnkowski came by plane to the location of Karpaty Army, renamed into Malopolska Army, which had already been encircled by the Wehrmacht. Since German units had established several bridgeheads along eastern bank of the San river, Sosnkowski decided to break through enemy lines in order to reach Lwow. The general had no idea that on September 12, the Germans had destroyed 24th Infantry Division near Bircza, and 3rd Mountain Brigade near Sambor. In the north, German forces pushed 10th Motorized Cavalry Brigade to Jaworow, while 1st Mountain Division attacked Lwow (see Battle of Lwow (1939)).

On September 14 Przemysl fell to the Wehrmacht, and Sosnkowski's forces retreated to Sadowa Wisznia, where they concentrated and marched to Lwow. On September 15 and 16, Poles managed to repel German attacks in the forests of Jaworow, destroying among others, SS Germania Regiment. On September 17, Sosnkowski was ordered to march to the Romanian Bridgehead, but was unable to achieve this, due to German encirclement of his army. In the area of Grodek Jagiellonski, remains of what was Polish Southern Front were destroyed by the Wehrmacht. Several soldiers managed to escape to Hungary, but the front as such ceased to exist.

== See also ==
- Polish army order of battle in 1939
- Polish contribution to World War II
- Polish Northern Front (1939)

== Bibliography ==
- Tadeusz Jurga: U kresu II Rzeczypospolitej, Książka i Wiedza 1985, ISBN 83-05-11669-7
- Tadeusz Jurga: Wojsko Polskie : krótki informator historyczny o Wojsku Polskim w latach II wojny światowej. 7, Regularne jednostki Wojska Polskiego w 1939 : organizacja, działania bojowe, uzbrojenie, metryki związków operacyjnych, dywizji i brygad. Warszawa : Wydawnictwo Ministerstwa Obrony Narodowej 1975.
