= Bolesław Bronisław Duch =

General Bolesław Bronisław Duch
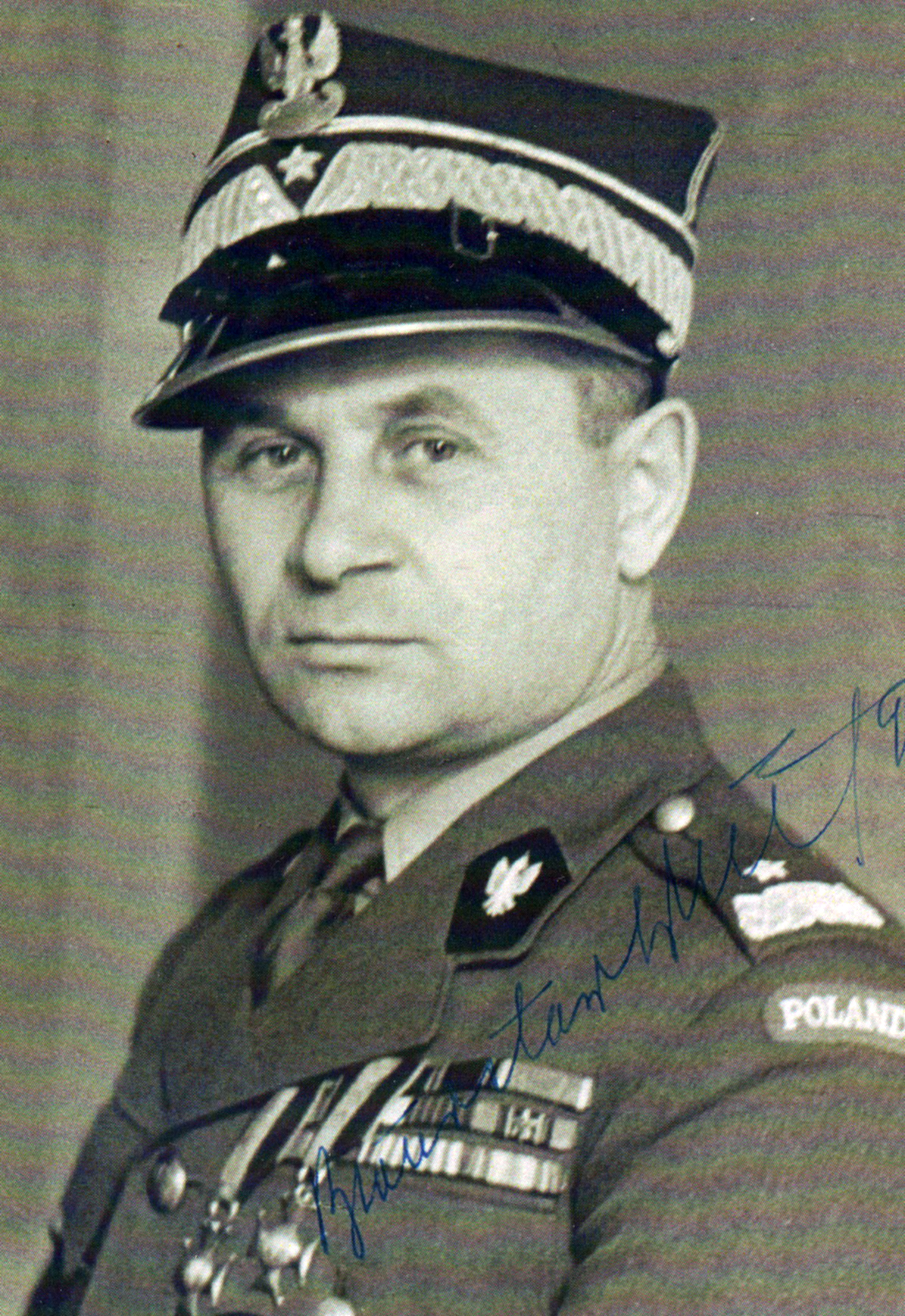
- Born: 15 November 1885; Borszczów, Austrian Galicia
- Died: 9 October 1980 (aged 94); London, England
- Military career
- Allegiance: Poland
- Service years: from 1914
- Rank: Generał dywizji
- Conflicts: Monte Cassino
- Awards: Virtuti Militari Knight's Cross Virtuti Militari Golden Medal Virtuti Militari Silver Medal Polonia Restituta Knight's Cross Golden Krzyz Zaslugi with Swords Krzyz Walecznych

Bolesław Bronisław Duch (1896–1980) was a Polish Major General and General Inspector of the Armed Forces.

== Life ==
Duch was born on 15 November 1896 at Borshchiv and attended schools in Ternopil before the outbreak of World War I. He served during World War I, 1914–18, in the Polish Legions. After Poland regained independence, he served in the Polish Army. In 1935-1938 he commanded the 73rd Infantry Regiment. At the outbreak of World War II, the commander of the 39th Reserve Infantry Division General Bruno Olbrycht was ill and the division was de facto commanded by Duch.

After Poland was overrun by Germany and the Soviet Union in September 1939, Duch managed to evade capture and served in western Europe, becoming commander successively of the Polish 1st Grenadier Division in France (1940), 1st Rifle Brigade of the 1st Polish Corps in Scotland (1942–43), and of the 3rd Carpathian Infantry Division of the 2nd Polish Corps (1943–46).

In 1947, Duch settled in London and became chairman of the Council of the World Polish Veterans' Association. He was the last General Inspector of the Armed Forces (from February 1980 until his death in October that year).

== Promotions ==
- 1914: Second Lieutenant (Podporucznik)
- 1919: Lieutenant (porucznik)
- 1919: Captain (Kapitan)
- 1924: Major (Major)
- 1929: Lieutenant Colonel (Podpułkownik)
- 1938: Colonel (Pułkownik)
- 1940: Brigadier (Generał brygady)
- 1945: Major General (Generał dywizji)

== Decorations ==
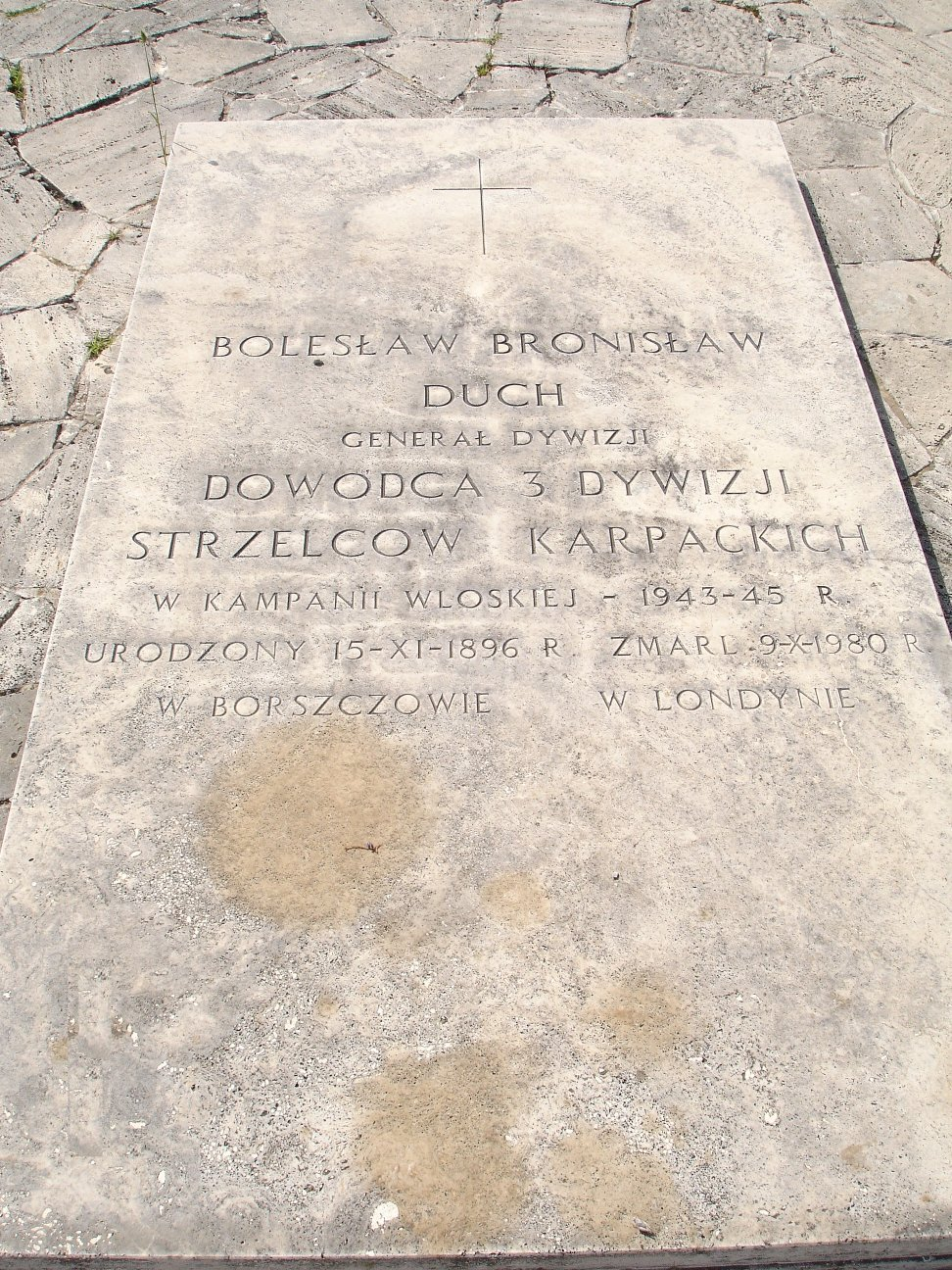
Duch's gravestone, Polish War Cemetery, Monte Cassino, Italy

- Knight's Cross of the Virtuti Militari (1 June 1945),
- Gold Cross of the Virtuti Militari (1940)
- Silver Cross of the Virtuti Militari
- Commander's Cross with Star of the Polonia Restituta
- Cross of Valour (Poland), 8 times
- Cross of Independence
- Golden Cross of Merit (Poland), with Swords
- Gold Cross of Merit
- Croix de Guerre (France)
- 1914–1918 Inter-Allied Victory medal (France)
- Commander of Legion of Honour (France)
- Military Cross (United Kingdom)
- War Cross of Military Valor (Italy)
- Medal for Bravery (Austria-Hungary)

== See also ==
- List of Poles
