= 20th Uhlan Regiment of King Jan III Sobieski =

20th Uhlan Regiment of King Jan III Sobieski (Polish: 20 Pułk Ułanów im. Króla Jana III Sobieskiego, 20 puł) was a cavalry unit of the Polish Army in the Second Polish Republic. Formed in 1920, it was stationed in the garrison of Rzeszów. During the 1939 Invasion of Poland, it was part of Kresowa Cavalry Brigade. The unit continued the traditions of the 20th Uhlan Regiment of the Duchy of Warsaw, which fought in the 1812 French invasion of Russia.

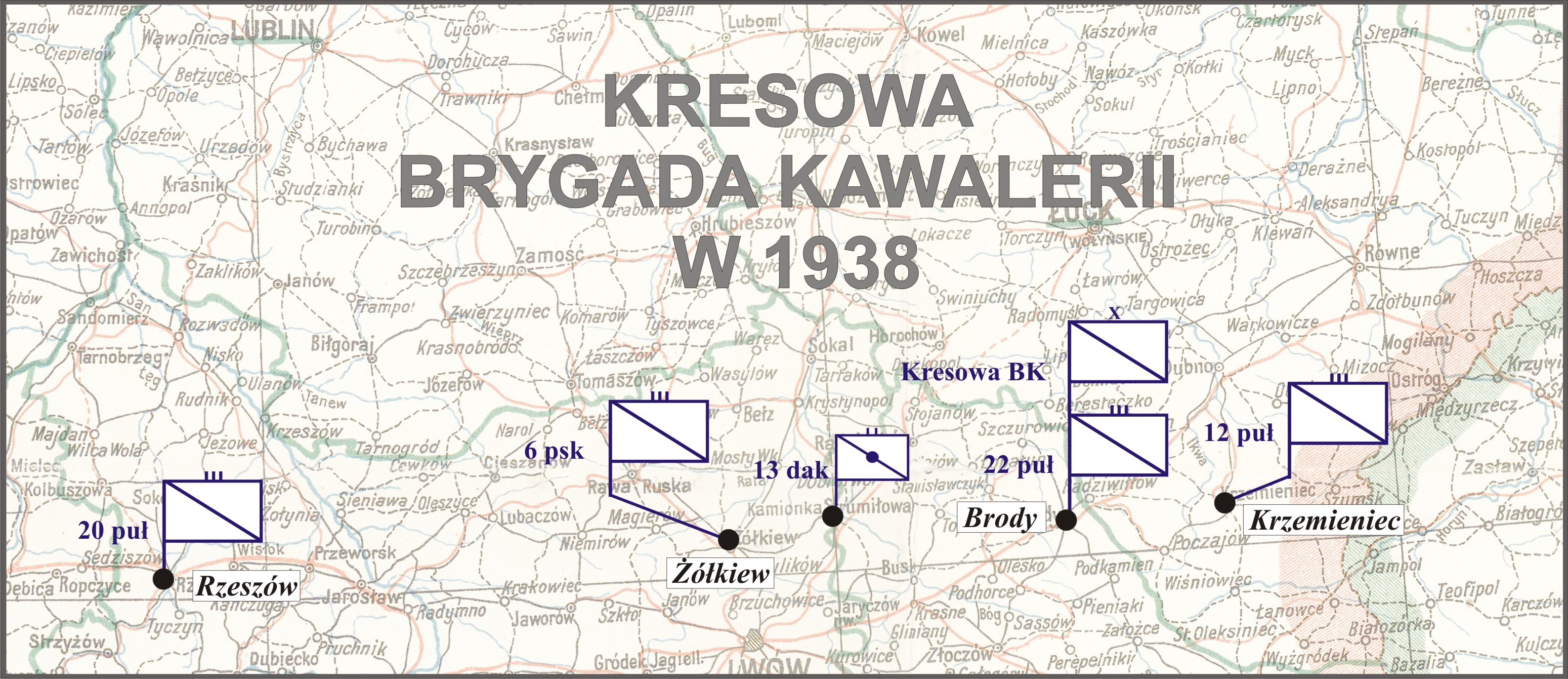
Kresowa BK w 1938

In early summer 1920 in Ostrołęka, the 108th Uhlan Regiment was formed under command of Colonel Dymitr Radziwilowicz. It consisted of four cavalry squadrons, and had 19 officers, 780 soldiers, 800 horses and 16 wagons. Armed with either Austrian or German weapons, the regiment was made of both fresh recruits, and veterans of World War I, mostly from Austro-Hungarian Army.

In mid-1920, at the peak of the Polish–Soviet War, the regiment was attached to the 8th Cavalry Brigade, which in the area of Ostrołęka opposed Soviet Cavalry Corps of Hayk Bzhishkyan. The 108th Uhlan Regiment set on its first patrol on July 20, 1920, fighting against the advancing enemy in Nowogród. On August 5, it was sent to recapture Łomża, but its 2nd Squadron was surrounded by the Soviets near the village of Kuleszka: two officers and 50 uhlans were KIA.

In early August 1920, Polish defensive line was formed along the Narew and the rail line from Ostrołęka to Łomża. The uhlans of the 108th Regiment fought with distinction near Nowy Dwor and Zabiele, losing 150 KIA / WIA. On August 14, the regiment attacked Ciechanów, capturing 513 POWs near Glinojeck. The unit entered Ciechanów on the next day, and then was ordered to prevent the retreat of enemy forces near Mława.

During the 1939 Invasion of Poland, the 20th Uhlan Regiment of King Jan III Sobieski was part of Kresowa Cavalry Brigade. Surrounded by the Wehrmacht near Psary, it capitulated on September 11.

== Commandants ==
- Colonel Dymitr Radziwiłłowicz (VII – VIII 1920[4])
- Major Piotr Stanislaw Glogowski (21 VIII 1920–1923)
- Colonel Rudolf Jan Otto Boyen (1923–1927)
- Colonel Stanislaw Jozef Rabinski (1927–1928)
- Colonel Wladyslaw Muller (1928–1931)
- Colonel Edward Jozef Godlewski (1931–1935)
- Colonel Andrzej Kunachowicz (1935–1939)

== Symbols ==
The regimental flag, funded by the residents of the Lands of Rzeszów and Ropczyce, was handed to the unit on October 11, 1921, by General Tadeusz Rozwadowski. It featured the names of locations of the 1920 war: Ostrołęka, Nowy Dwor, Zabiele, Rudnia Baranowska, Biskupiec.

The badge, approved in 1924, featured the Maltese cross and royal crown with inscription I3R (Ioannus Tercius Rex).

== Sources ==
- Henryk Smaczny: Księga kawalerii polskiej 1914–1947: rodowody, barwa, broń. Warszawa: TESCO, 1989
- Tadeusz Suchorowski, Zarys historii wojennej 20-go Pułku Ułanów imienia Króla Jana III Sobieskiego, Warszawa 1929

== See also ==
- Polish cavalry
