= Kresowa Cavalry Brigade =

Unit of the Polish Army

Kresowa Cavalry Brigade (Polish: Kresowa Brygada Kawalerii) was a unit of the Polish Army in the interbellum period. It was organized on April 1, 1937 and was based on the Second Cavalry Brigade. Stationed in the town of Brody, it consisted of several regiments:

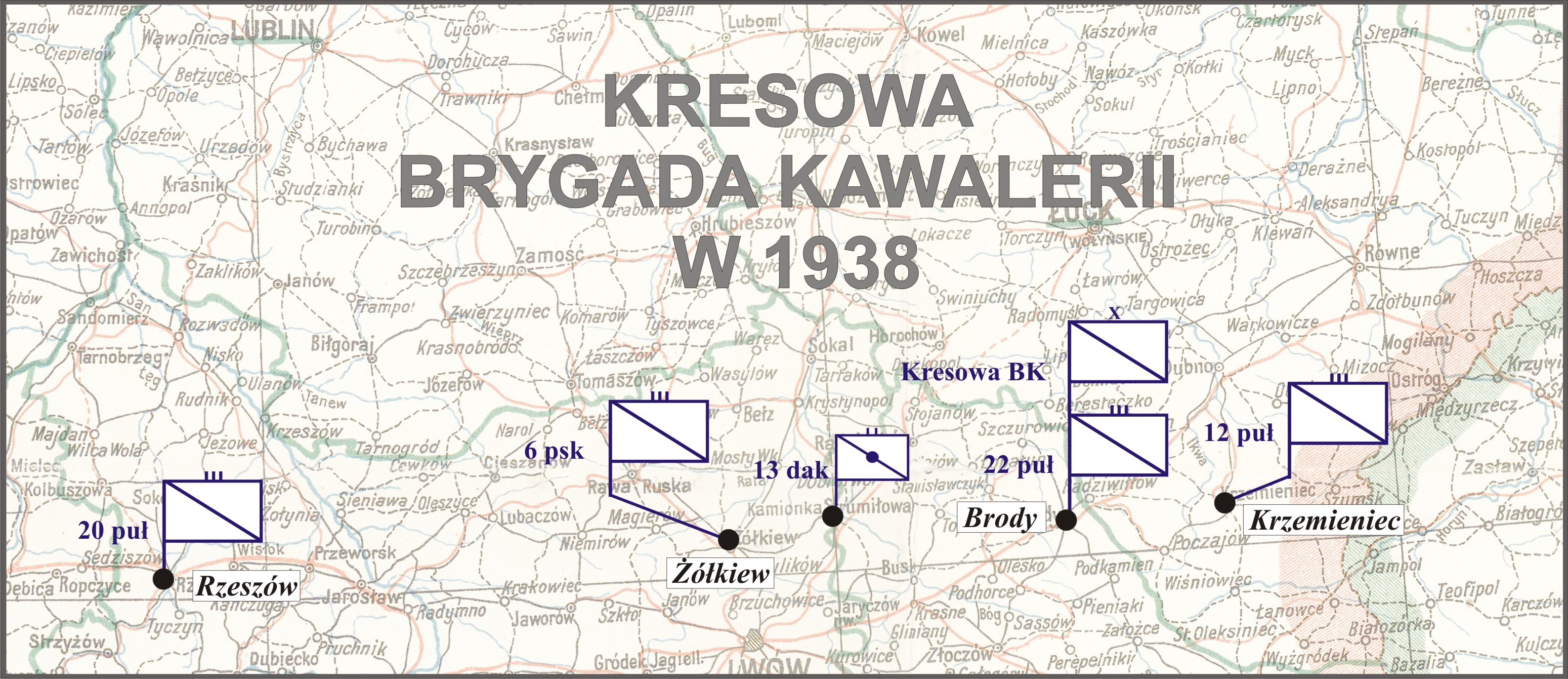
Kresowa BK w 1938

- 20th Uhlan Regiment of King Jan III Sobieski, stationed in Rzeszów,
- 22nd Carpathian Uhlan Regiment, stationed in Brody,
- 6th Hetman Stanisław Żółkiewski Mounted Rifles Regiment, stationed in Zolkiew,
- 13th Mounted Artillery Regiment, stationed in Kamionka Strumilowa,
- 4th Squadron of Pioneers, stationed in Lwów,
- 2nd Squadron of Communication, stationed in Lwów..

During the Polish September Campaign the Brigade, under Colonel Stefan Hanka-Kulesza was part of the Łódź Army. In the first two days of the conflict it remained in the rear, however, Luftwaffe attacks on the unit inflicted heavy losses.

In the morning of September 3, 1939, the Brigade took positions around the town of Szadek, strengthening the 10th Infantry Division. The two units merged, creating "Sieradz" Operational Group under General Franciszek Dindorf-Ankowicz. Next day, it attacked German 24th I.D. of General Friedrich Olbricht, west of the town of Warta. After first contact with the enemy, the Brigade withdrew for unknown reasons, leaving a gap in the northern wing of the Łódź Army. As a consequence, Colonel Hanka-Kulesza was dismissed and replaced by Colonel Jerzy Grobicki.

On September 5 the Brigade defended the line of the Warta river, near Sieradz. Threatened with encirclement, it withdrew eastwards, crossing the Ner to the area of Zgierz. On September 8, as a result of German attacks, it dispersed. Remnants crossed the Vistula on September 10 and joined the Northern Front of General Stefan Dąb-Biernacki, fighting in the Battle of Tomaszów Lubelski. Last units of the Brigade capitulated on September 26, after skirmishes in the area of Sadowa Wisznia.

== See also ==
- Polish army order of battle in 1939
- Polish contribution to World War II
