= 22nd Carpathian Uhlan Regiment =

22nd Carpathian Uhlan Regiment (Polish: 22 Pułk Ułanów Podkarpackich, 22 puł) was a cavalry unit of the Polish Army in the Second Polish Republic. Formed in November 1920, it fought in the 1939 Invasion of Poland. The regiment was garrisoned in the town of Brody (current Ukraine), and belonged to Kresowa Cavalry Brigade.

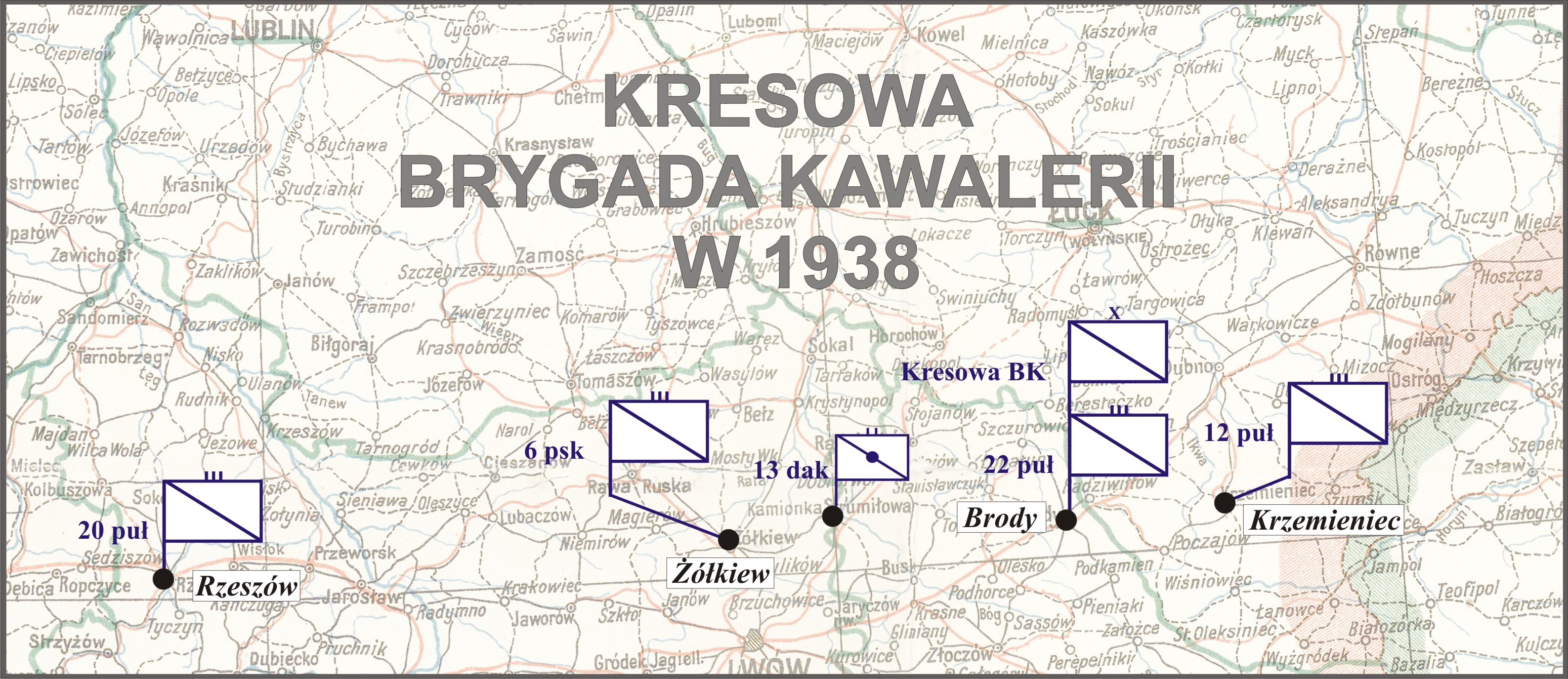
Kresowa BK w 1938

The history of the unit dates back to the late summer of 1920, when in the village of Nowosielce-Gniewosz near Lwow, the 209th Volunteer Uhlan Regiment was formed by Rotmistrz Henryk Towarnicki. On October 7, 1920, the unit was garrisoned in the barracks located in Bakonczyce, a district of Przemysl, and on November 8–14, 1920, it was merged with the 209th Carpathian Uhlan Regiment, taking on the new name, the 22nd Carpathian Uhlan Regiment.

In October 1921, regimental headquarters were moved to Hrubieszow, to be moved to Radymno after three years. Finally, in June 1924, the regiment settled in Brody, where it remained until 1939.

During the 1939 Invasion of Poland, the 22nd Carpathian Uhlan Regiment belonged to Kresowa Cavalry Brigade. Concentrated in the area of Zgierz and Strykow in central Poland, it was forced to withdraw behind the Vistula river, and in mid-September 1939 fought near Lublin, moving gradually towards the south. It capitulated in late September 1939 near Bilgoraj.

== Commandants ==
- Major Romuald Niemojewski (1920 - 1921)
- Colonel Wladyslaw Fibich (1921 - 1926)
- Colonel Jerzy Grobicki (XII 1926 - XII 1929),
- Colonel Stanislaw Rostworowski (XII 1929 - VII 1935),
- Colonel Eugeniusz Jozef Jasiewicz (4 VII 1935 - 1937),
- Colonel Wladyslaw Plonka (1937 - 1939).

== Symbols ==
The regimental flag was handed to it on October 23 in Przemysl, by a group of residents of Lwow. The ceremony was attended by General Lucjan Zeligowski, and the flag featured among others the Polish Eagle, and the coats of arms of the cities of Lwow and Lublin.

The badge, approved in 1925 by Minister of Military Affairs Wladyslaw Sikorski, was in the shape of the cross, with a red shield and white eagle in the middle.

The regiment had its zurawiejka.

== Sources ==
- Henryk Smaczny: Księga kawalerii polskiej 1914-1947: rodowody, barwa, broń. Warszawa: TESCO, 1989
- Tadeusz Suchorowski, Zarys historii wojennej 20-go Pułku Ułanów imienia Króla Jana III Sobieskiego, Warszawa 1929

== See also ==
- Polish cavalry
