= 55th Infantry Division (Poland) =

The 55th Infantry Division (Polish: 55. Dywizja Piechoty) was a reserve unit of the Polish Army during the interbellum period, which took part in the Polish September Campaign. Commanded by Colonel Stanislaw Kalabinski, it was part of Operational Group Silesia of the Kraków Army.

== History ==
The Division was created at the end of August 1939, out of battalions of the Upper Silesian Brigade of the National Defence and the National Defence Regiment "Szczakowa". Its task was to defend the Fortified Area Mikołów, which was part of the Fortified Area of Silesia. Between September 1 and 2, 1939, it fought against the advancing German 8th I.D. in the area of Wyry. After heavy fighting, on 3 September it was forced to retreat towards the Nida River.

On 7 September the Division took part in the skirmishes northwest of Kraków and around Proszowice. Fighting its way, the unit managed to cross the Nida and withdraw eastwards. In the night of September 18/19, the Division joined Polish forces concentrated around Tomaszów Lubelski. It capitulated on 23 September when it ran out of ammunition (see Battle of Tomaszów Lubelski).

== See also ==
- Polish army order of battle in 1939
- Polish contribution to World War II
- Operational Group
- List of Polish divisions in World War II
