= 39th Infantry Division (Poland) =

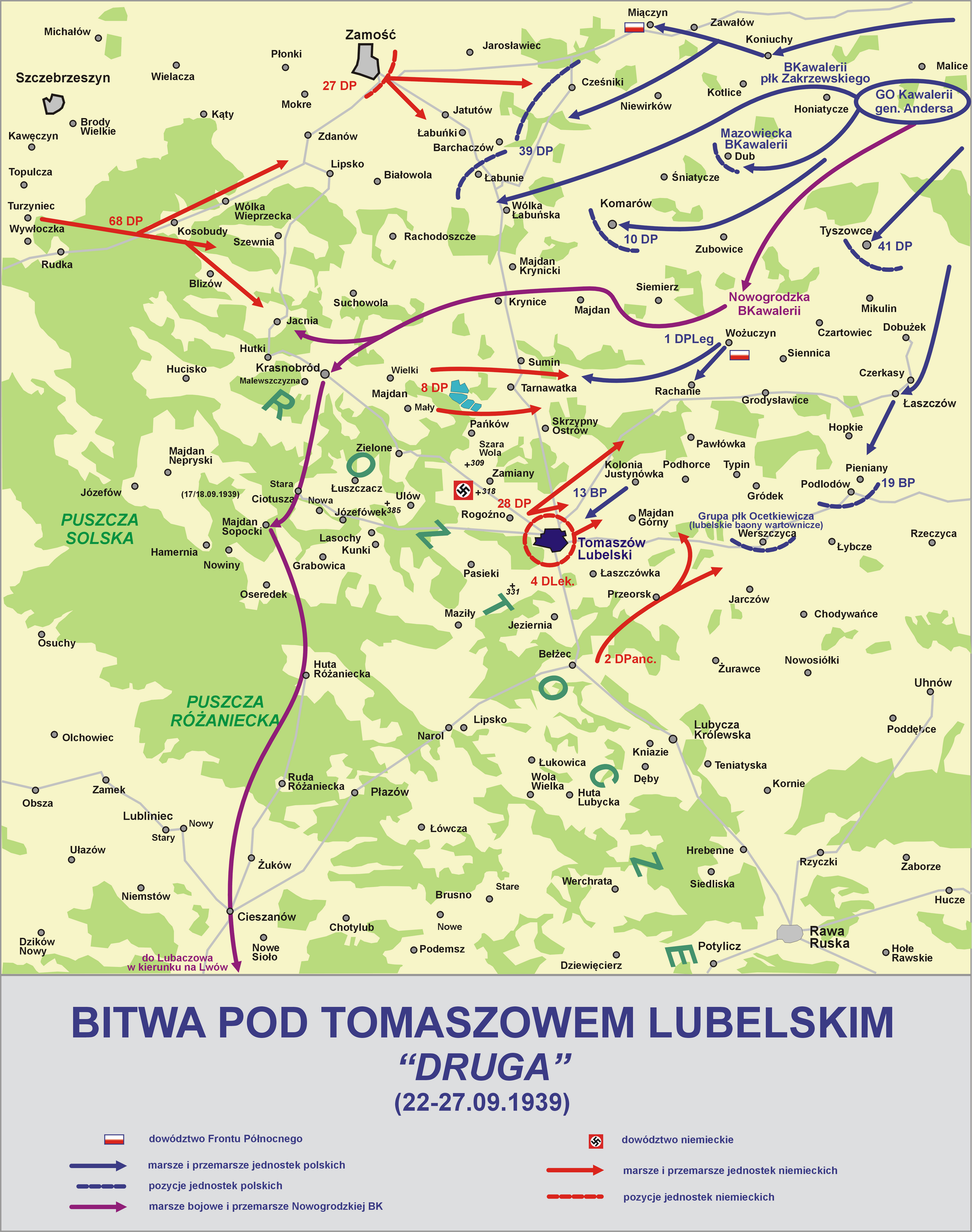

The Polish 39th Infantry Division was a reserve unit of the Polish Army, which took part in the Polish September Campaign. Commanded by General Bruno Olbrycht, it was part of the Prusy Army and was concentrated in the area of the Holy Cross Mountains.

The division was fully assembled on September 10, 1939. It was ordered to defend the Vistula River line between the towns of Dęblin and Kazimierz Dolny. Due to General Olbrycht's sickness, it was de facto commanded by Colonel Bronisław Duch. On September 14, the 39th, which had become part of the Lublin Army, withdrew towards Chełm. Five days later, it engaged the Wehrmacht in Krasnystaw, then fought the German 4th Light Division near Zamość. The division took part in the Battle of Tomaszów Lubelski and capitulated on September 26, 1939.

== See also ==
- Polish army order of battle in 1939
- Polish contribution to World War II
- List of Polish divisions in World War II
