= Stefan Rowecki =

Polish general

Stefan Paweł Rowecki
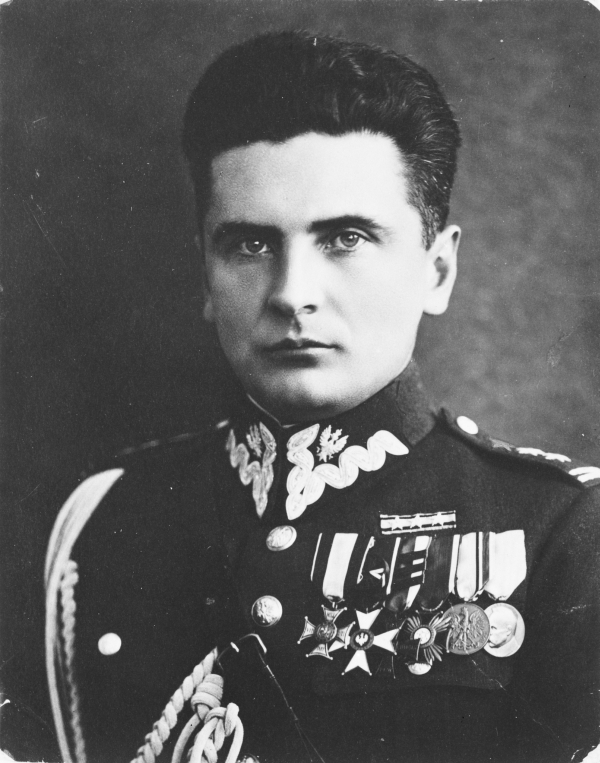
- Stefan Rowecki in the early 1930s
- Born: 25 December 1895; Piotrków Trybunalski, Congress Poland
- Died: 2 August 1944 (aged 48); Sachsenhausen concentration camp, Oranienburg, Nazi Germany
- Military career
- Allegiance: Second Polish Republic
- Branch: Austro-Hungarian Army Polish Legions Polish Army
- Service years: 1914–1943
- Rank: Major general
- Nicknames: Grot, Rakoń, Grabica, Inżynier, Jan, Kalina, Tur
- Units: Commander-in-chief of Union of Armed Struggle and Home Army
- Conflicts: World War I Polish–Soviet War; World War II
- Awards: Order of the White Eagle; Virtuti Militari (Golden Cross); Virtuti Militari (Silver Cross); Polonia Restituta (Officer's Cross); Cross of Valour (8 times); Gold Cross of Merit (twice)

Stefan Paweł Rowecki (pseudonym: Grot, "Spearhead", hence the alternate name, Stefan Grot-Rowecki; 25 December 1895 – 2 August 1944) was a Polish general, journalist and the leader of the Armia Krajowa. He was murdered by the Gestapo in prison on the personal order of Heinrich Himmler.

== Life ==
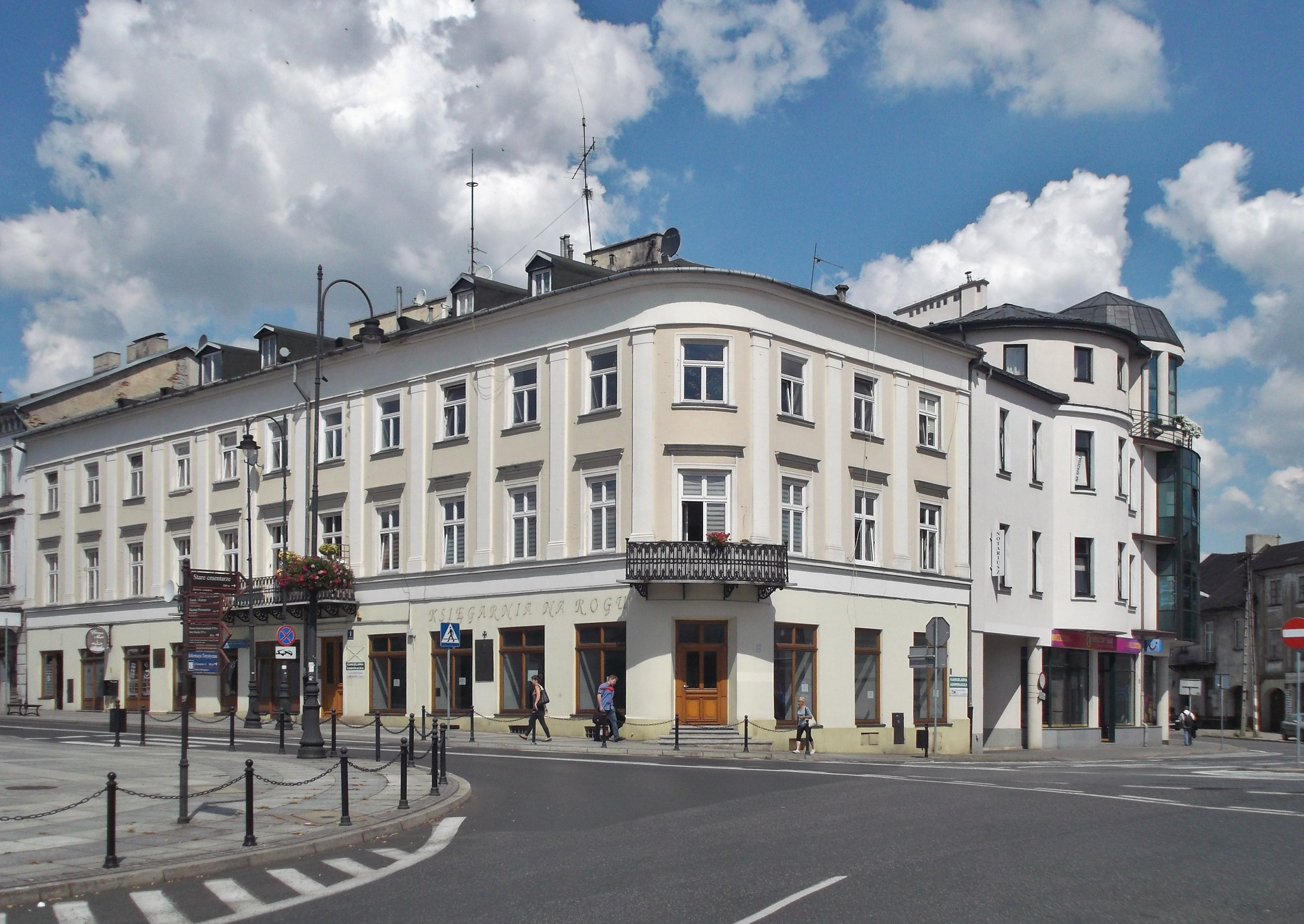
Birthplace and childhood home of Stefan Rowecki in Piotrków Trybunalski

Rowecki was born in Piotrków Trybunalski. In his home town he was one of the organizers of a secret scouting organization. During World War I he was conscripted into the Austro-Hungarian army and later into the First Brigade of the Polish Legion. He was interned in August 1917 after the majority of his unit had refused to pledge loyalty to the Emperor of Austria. In February 1918, he was released from the internment camp in Beniaminów and joined the Polska Siła Zbrojna. After the establishment of the newly independent Poland, he joined the Polish Army.

Rowecki fought in the Polish–Soviet War (1919–1920). After the war, he remained in the army and organized the first military weekly periodical (Przegląd Wojskowy). From 1930 to 1935, he commanded the 55th Infantry Regiment in Leszno.

== World War II ==
From June 1939, Rowecki organised the Warsaw Armoured Motorized Brigade (Warszawska Brygada Pancerno-Motorowa, 7TP, TKS tanks). On 1 September 1939 the Nazi-German Army invaded Poland. Although Rowecki's unit did not reach full mobilization, it did, however, take part in the defense of Poland.

After the Polish defeat, Rowecki managed to avoid capture and returned to Warsaw. In October 1939, he became one of the leaders, then in 1940 commander, of the Union of Armed Struggle (ZWZ). In 1941, Rowecki organized sabotage in the territories east of the Polish pre-war borders Wachlarz. From 1942, he was commander of the Armia Krajowa (Home Army).

As commander of the Home Army, Rowecki instituted policies favorable to Jews. In February 1943, he ordered the Home Army to help the Jewish underground seeking to mount ghetto uprisings. In particular, Rowecki authorized aid to the Jewish underground in the Warsaw Ghetto before and during the Warsaw Ghetto Uprising by providing arms and mounting diversionary attacks.

On 30 June 1943 he was arrested by the Gestapo in Warsaw and sent to Berlin. Rowecki was arrested due to his betrayal by Ludwik Kalkstein "Hanka", Eugeniusz Świerczewski "Genes" and Blanka Kaczorowska "Sroka" who were Gestapo agents. All of them were members of the Home Army but in fact collaborated with the Gestapo. Swierczewski, Kalkstein and Kaczorowska were sentenced to death for high treason by the Secret War Tribunal of the Polish Secret State. The sentence on Eugeniusz Swierczewski was carried out by troops commanded by Stefan Rys ("Jozef"). Swierczewski was hanged in the basement of the house at 74 Krochmalna Street in Warsaw. Kalkstein received protection from the Gestapo and was not harmed. He fought in a Waffen SS unit during the Warsaw Uprising of 1944 under the name of Konrad Stark. After the war, he worked for the Polish Radio station in Szczecin and was later recruited as an agent by the Urząd Bezpieczeństwa. In 1982, he emigrated to France; he died in 1994. Blanka Kaczorowska also survived the war. Her death sentence was not carried out because she was pregnant. After the war, she also worked as a secret agent for the Urząd Bezpieczeństwa and later for the renamed Służba Bezpieczeństwa. She emigrated to France in 1971. She died in 2002.

In Berlin he was imprisoned at Oranienburg and was questioned by many prominent Nazi officials (including Ernst Kaltenbrunner, Heinrich Himmler and Heinrich Müller). He was offered an anti-Bolshevik alliance, but refused. He was likely executed in August 1944 in Sachsenhausen. His execution was ordered by Heinrich Himmler.

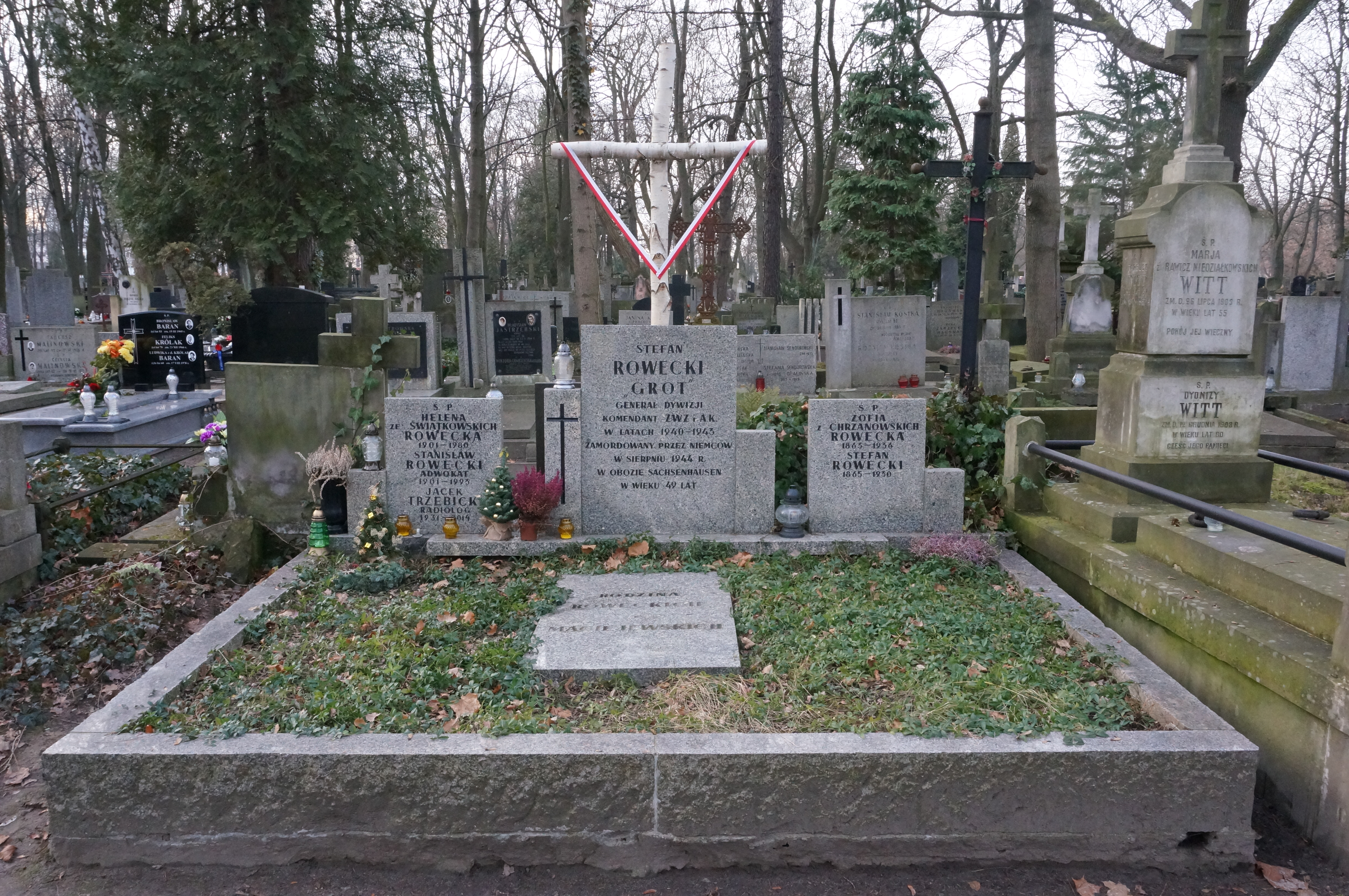
Grave of Stefan Rowecki at the Powązki Cemetery in Warsaw

There have been claims that the arrest of Rowecki on 30 June 1943 was a result of a wider intelligence operation against the Polish Underground State with the goal of eliminating top commanders and political leaders of the Polish resistance. During the same period, the Gestapo arrested the commander of National Armed Forces (NSZ), Colonel Ignacy Oziewicz on 9 June 1943. On 4 July 1943, General Władysław Sikorski died in a plane crash under mysterious circumstances. Within a period of two months, the Polish Army had lost three top commanders.

== Medals ==
- Order of the White Eagle, posthumously (11 November 1995)
- Virtuti Militari Golden Cross (1942; Silver Cross in 1923)
- Polonia Restituta, Officer's Cross
- Cross of Valour 8 times, 4 times for Polish-Soviet War and 4 times for Polish Defensive War of 1939
- Gold Cross of Merit twice
- Cross of Independence with Swords
- Medal Pamiątkowy za Wojnę 1918-1921
- Medal 10-lecia Odzyskania Niepodległości
- Armia Krajowa Cross, posthumously (1967)
- Star of Perseverance (Gwiazda Wytrwałości, posthumously)
- Legion of Merit Commander, posthumously by Ronald Reagan (USA 9 August 1984)
- Légion d'honneur, Officer's Cross (France 1937)

== See also ==
- General Stefan "Grot" Rowecki Bridge - a bridge named after him in Warsaw
- FB MSBS Grot - a Polish modular assault rifle named after his WW2 pseudonym
