= Bruno Olbrycht =

Polish Army officer

General Bruno Olbrycht
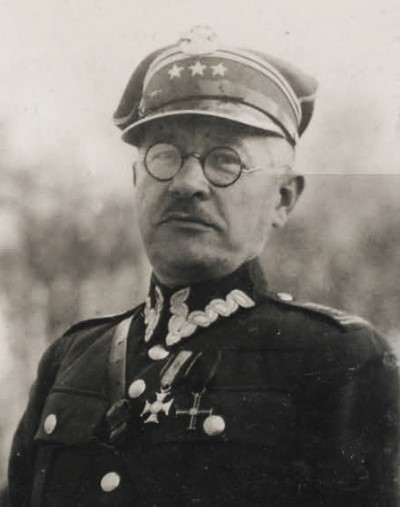
- Colonel Olbrycht before 1934.
- Born: 6 October 1895; Sanok, Galicia, Austria-Hungary
- Died: 23 March 1951 (aged 55); Kraków, Polish People's Republic
- Burial place: Powazki Cemetery, Warsaw (military section); 52°15′07″N 20°58′22″E
- Military career
- Allegiance: Austria-Hungary (1914–1918); Second Polish Republic (1918–1939); Polish People's Republic (1945–1947)
- Branch: Austro-Hungarian Army; Polish Armed Forces; Polish People's Army
- Service years: 1914–1947
- Rank: Generał dywizji (Major general)
- Nickname: Olza
- Commands: 8th Legions Infantry Regiment (1921–1927); Center of Infantry Training (1930–1936); Cieszyn Silesia (1944); 21st Home Army Mountain Infantry Division (1944–1945); Warsaw Military District (1946–1947)
- Conflicts: First World War; Polish-Ukrainian War; Polish-Soviet War; Second World War; War against anti-communist resistance
- Awards

Bruno Edward Olbrycht (nom de guerre: Olza; 6 October 1895 – 23 March 1951) was a soldier of the Austro-Hungarian Army and officer (later general) of the Polish Army both in the Second Polish Republic and postwar Poland. Born on 6 October 1895 in Sanok, Austrian Galicia, Olbrycht fought in Polish Legions in World War I, Polish–Ukrainian War, Polish–Soviet War and the Invasion of Poland. He died on 23 March 1951 in Kraków.

== Biography and military career ==
Bruno Olbrycht’s father, Piotr Olbrycht was a veterinarian. As a teenager, he graduated from elementary school in Bochnia and high school in Wadowice, where he joined the Sokol paramilitary organization. During World War One, Olbrycht served in 3rd Regions Infantry Regiment. In 1917, he was promoted to captain and planned to study at Jagiellonian University, but instead, he continued to fight the Russians in Eastern Galicia, Bukovina and Volhynia. After the Battle of Rarańcza, he was interned in a camp at Khust.

In 1919–1920, Olbrycht participated in Polish-Ukrainian War as battalion commandant in 8th Legions Infantry Regiment. In the summer 1920, he fought in Polish-Soviet War in Volhynia and later in Belarus. In October 1920, following order of General Lucjan Żeligowski, he captured Švenčionys (Swieciany) (see Republic of Central Lithuania).

In 1921–1927, Olbrycht commanded 8th Legions Infantry Regiment, which was stationed at Lublin. On 1 December 1924 he was promoted to colonel, and in 1927 was moved to 2nd Legions Infantry Division in Kielce. In 1930–1936, he commanded Center of Infantry Training (Centrum Wyszkolenia Piechoty) in Rembertów, from which he was transferred to 3rd Legions Infantry Division in Zamosc. On 19 March 1937 Olbrycht was promoted to Generał brygady; in May 1938 he returned to Center of Infantry Training, where he remained until September 1939.

During the Invasion of Poland, Olbrycht was named commandant of 39th Infantry Division, but due to his illness, the division was de facto commanded by Colonel Bronislaw Duch. Captured by the Wehrmacht on 27 September 1939, Olbrycht was kept at Oflag II-D and Oflag IV-B Koenigstein, where he began publishing a camp newspaper Gazetka Obozowa. In 1941, as a war invalid, he was transferred to Ujazdów Hospital in Warsaw, and next year German authorities released him. Soon after his release, Olbrycht joined the Home Army. In summer 1944, during Operation Tempest, he commanded Operational Group Cieszyn Silesia. Arrested by Germans in August 1944, he was freed by the Home Army, and became commandant of 21st Home Army Mountain Infantry Division.

On 14 April 1945, Olbrycht joined Polish People's Army. In June 1945, he was sent to Officer Infantry School Nr. 1, and in late July of that year he was appointed commandant of Department of Officer Infantry and Cavalry at Polish Ministry of National Defence. On 14 December 1945 he was promoted to Divisional general. Olbrycht, as commandant of Warsaw Military District, actively fought anti-Communist rebellion (see Cursed soldiers). From December 1946 to October 1947, he commanded the Center of Infantry Training in Rembertów. In November 1947 he suffered a stroke, and was released from active duty. He died after third stroke, on 23 March 1951 in Kraków, and was buried at military section of Powazki Cemetery in Warsaw.

== Promotions ==
- Chorąży (Standard-bearer) - 1914
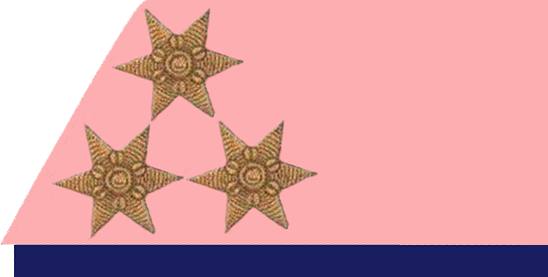
- Hauptmann (Captain) - 1917
- Podpułkownik (Lieutenant colonel) - 3 May 1922
- Pułkownik (Colonel) - 1 December 1924
- Generał brygady (Brigadier general) - 19 March 1937
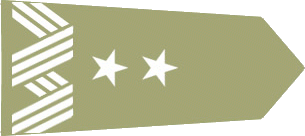
- Generał dywizji (Major general) - 1945

== Awards ==
- Order of the Cross of Grunwald, 3rd Class (21 July 1946)
- Silver Cross of Virtuti Militari
- Cross of Independence (9 November 1931)
- Officer's Cross of the Order of Polonia Restituta (10 November 1928)
- Knight's Cross of the Order of Polonia Restituta
- Cross of Valour (four times)
- Gold Cross of Merit (18 March 1934)
- Partisan Cross
- Commemorative Medal for the War of 1918–1921
- Medal of the Tenth Anniversary of Regained Independence
- Commander of the Order of the Sword (Sweden, 1932)
- Commander of the Order of the Three Stars (Estonia, 1934)
- Commander of the Order of Military Merit (Bulgaria, 1936)

== Sources ==
- Brzeziński, Stanisław; Majewski, Ryszard; Witek, Henryk (1984). Wyższa Szkoła Oficerska Wojsk Zmechanizowanych im. Tadeusza Kościuszki, 1943-1983 [School of Mechanised Forces Military im. Tadeusz Kosciuszko, 1943-1983] (in Polish). Warszawa: Wydawn. Ministerstwa Obrony Narodowej. ISBN 83-11-07037-7. OCLC 12805162.
- Grzelak, Czesław (1984). Wyższa Szkoła Piechoty w Rembertowie, 1948-1954 [School of Infantry in Rembertów, 1948-1954] (in Polish). Warszawa: Wydawn. Ministerstwa Obrony Narodowej. ISBN 83-11-07102-0. OCLC 14127933.
- Jurga, Tadeusz; Strzałkowski, Waldemar (1990). "Życiorysy dowódców jednostek polskich w wojnie obronnej" [Biographies of Polish commanders of units in a defensive war]. Obrona Polski 1939 [Polish Defence 1939] (in Polish). Warszawa: Instytut Wydawniczy Pax. ISBN 83-211-1096-7. OCLC 26445382.
- Kosk, Henryk Piotr (2001) [1998]. Generalicja polska : popularny słownik biograficzny [Polish generals: popular biographical dictionary] (in Polish). Pruszków: Ajaks. ISBN 83-87-10381-0. OCLC 48524461.
- Królikowski, Janusz (2010). Generałowie i admirałowie Wojska Polskiego 1943-1990 [Generals and admirals of the Polish Army 1943-1990] (in Polish). Toruń: Wydawn. Adam Marszałek. p. III:M-S. ISBN 978-83-76-11801-7. OCLC 689058907.
- Kryska-Karski, Tadeusz; Żurakowski, Stanisław (1991). Generałowie Polski Niepodległej [Generals Polish Independent] (in Polish). Warszawa: Editions Spotkania. OCLC 24935744.
- Stawecki, Piotr (1994). Słownik biograficzny generałów Wojska Polskiego, 1918-1939 [Biographical Dictionary of the generals of the Polish Army, 1918-1939] (in Polish). Warszawa: Wydawn. Bellona. ISBN 83-11-08262-6. OCLC 32079247.
