= Tadeusz Piskor =

Polish general

General Tadeusz Piskor
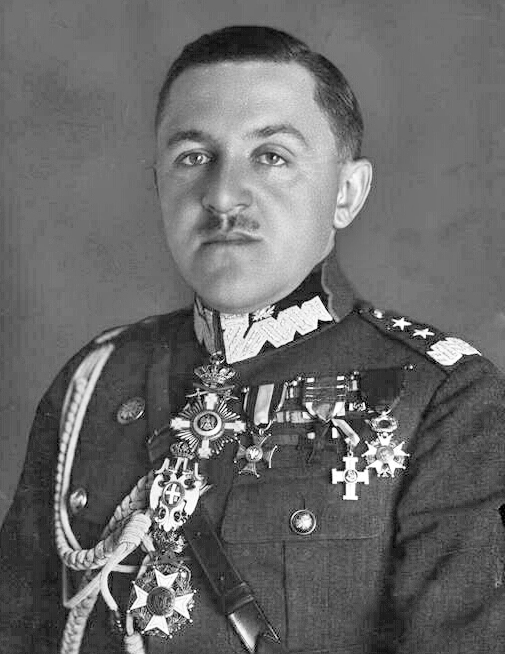

Chief of the General Staff
- In office 28 June 1926 – 5 December 1931
- Preceded by: Stanisław Burhardt-Bukacki
- Succeeded by: Janusz Gąsiorowski

Personal details
- Born: 1 February 1889 Bór Kunowski, Congress Poland
- Died: 22 March 1951 (aged 62) London, United Kingdom
- Resting place: St Mary's Catholic Cemetery
- Citizenship: Polish
- Education: Lviv Polytechnic

Military service
- Allegiance: Second Polish Republic
- Branch/service: Polish Legions Polish Armed Forces
- Years of service: 1912–1939
- Rank: Brigadier General
- Commands: 28th Infantry Division; Lublin Army
- Battles/wars: First World War; Polish–Soviet War; Invasion of Poland

Tadeusz Ludwik Piskor (1889–1951) was a Polish Army general.

== Life and career ==
Piskor was born on 1 February 1889 in Bór Kunowski. Before World War I, he was a member of Polish pro-independence organizations. During World War I, he served in the Polish Legions, and subsequently fought in the 1919–21 Polish-Soviet War.

During the Interbellum, Piskor held various posts, including Chief of the General Staff, and Army Inspector.

During the September 1939 Campaign, he commanded the Lublin Army. His forces were defeated in the Battle of Tomaszów Lubelski by German forces, and he became a prisoner of war at Fort Srebrna Góra from 1939.

After the war, he settled in London, where he died in 1951.

== Honours and awards ==
- Silver Cross of the Virtuti Militari (1921)
- Commander's Cross of the Order of Polonia Restituta, previously awarded the Officer's Cross
- Cross of Independence
- Cross of Valour - four times
- Gold Cross of Merit
- Commemorative Medal for War 1918-1921
- Decades Regained Independence Medal
- Officers' badge "Parasol"
- Commander's Cross of the Legion of Honour (France), previously awarded the Knight's Cross
- Commander's Cross of the Order of the Star of Romania
- Commander's Cross of the Order of the White Eagle (Kingdom of Yugoslavia)
- Commander's Cross with Swords of the Order of Leopold (Belgium)
- Cross of Liberty class III (Estonia)
- Order of the Cross of the Eagle Class I (Estonia, 1932)

== See also ==
- Marian Rejewski, footnote citation no. 1.
