= Lublin Army =

1939 Polish army

Lublin Army (Polish: Armia Lublin) was an improvised Polish Army created on September 4, 1939 from the Warsaw Armoured Motorized Brigade and various smaller units concentrated around the cities of Lublin, Sandomierz and upper Vistula river. It was commanded by Maj. Gen. Tadeusz Piskor. Lublin Army was not part of prewar Polish operational plans. It was improvised when it became obvious that quickly advancing Wehrmacht armored and motorized units would reach the Vistula river line.

== Tasks ==
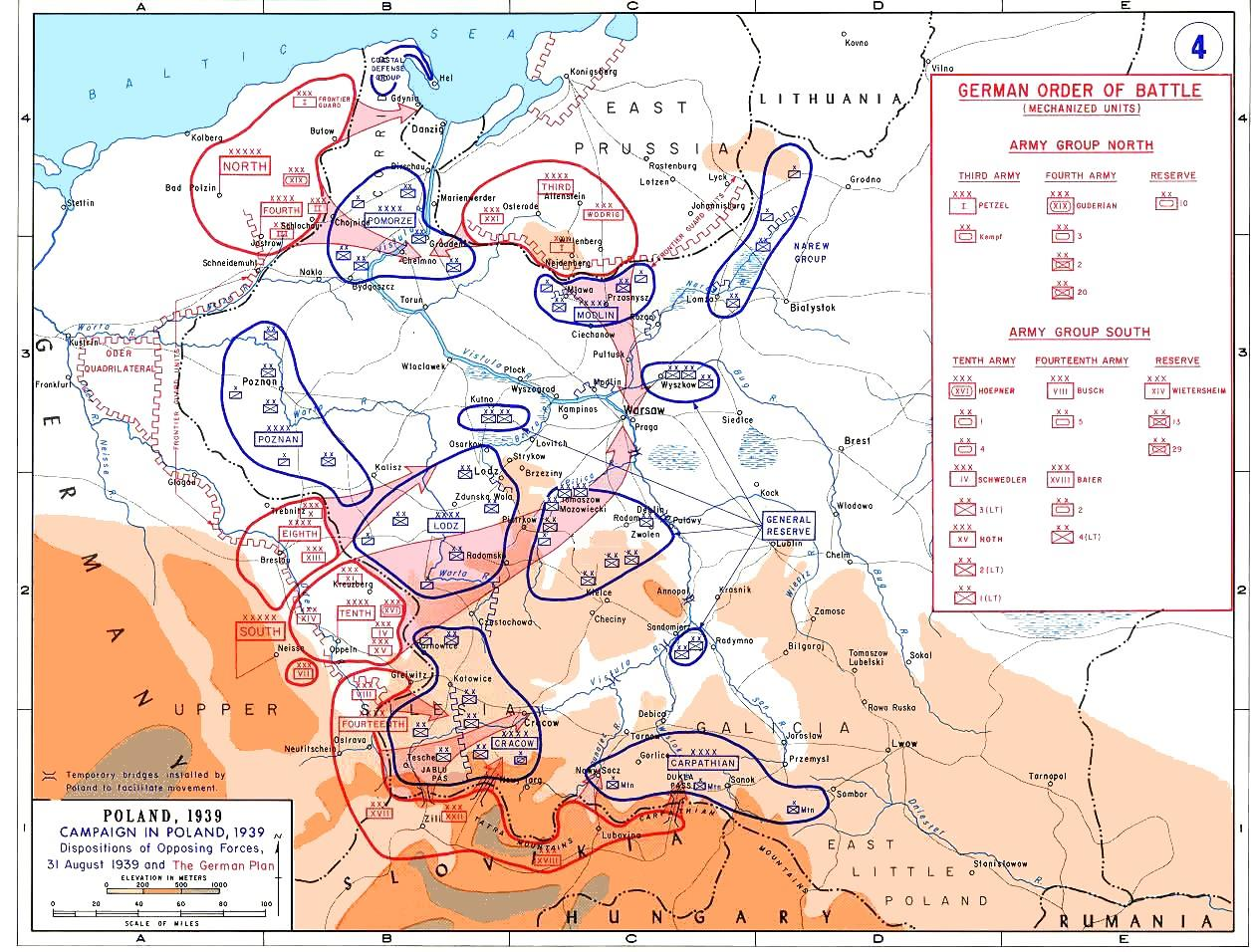
Forces as of 31 August and German plan of attack.

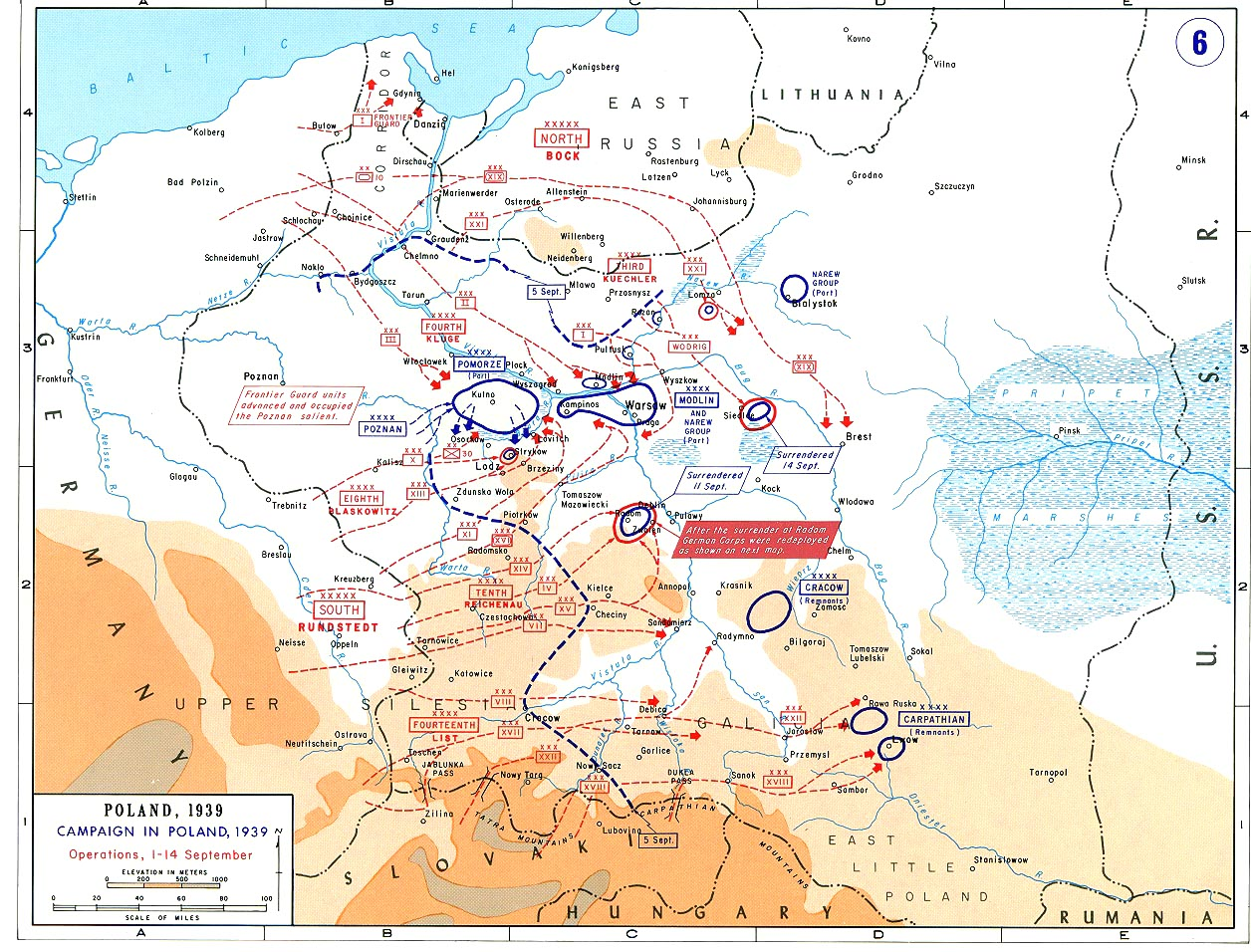
Forces as of 14 September with troop movements up to this date.

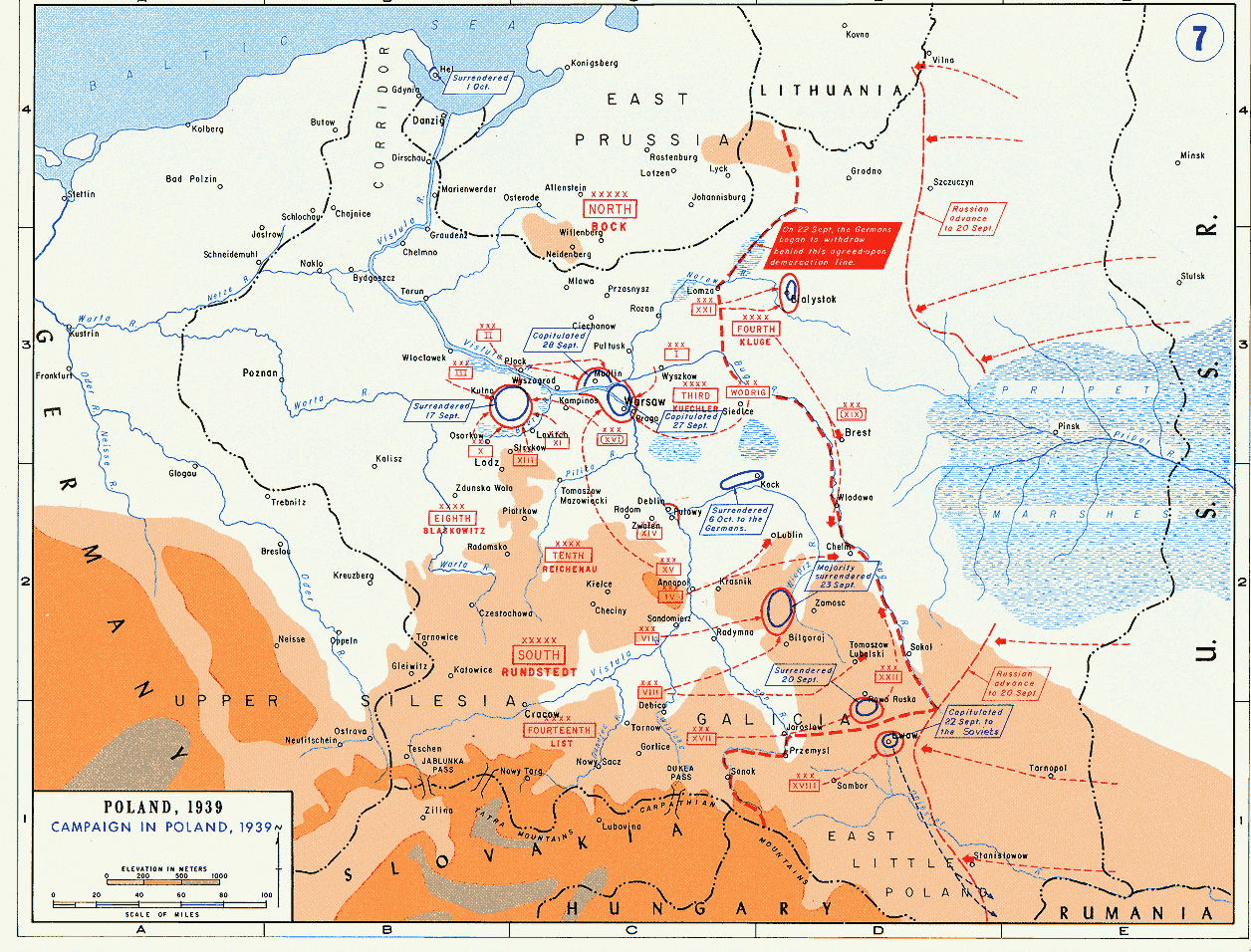
Forces after 14 September with troop movements after this date

Lublin Army was tasked with defending the crossings of the Vistula river from Modlin (north of Warsaw) to Sandomierz in the south. Polish planners wanted to reinforce it with elements of the Prusy Army, which after the Battle of Radom had retreated from German encirclement, and managed to cross the Vistula. These elements, however, were of little military value, and were ordered to concentrate near Chelm. Instead, Lublin Army received 39th Reserve Infantry Division and improvised Sandomierz Group.

== Operational history ==
Lublin Army came into contact with the enemy on September 8, near Gora Kalwaria and Dęblin. After the first clash, the Germans concentrated their efforts on eliminating the remnants of Prusy Army. On September 12, the Wehrmacht advanced in the area of Annopol and Solec nad Wisla. Under its pressure, Polish forces retreated towards Krasnik, where they merged with Krakow Army, and together fought in the Battle of Tomaszow Lubelski (September 17–20).

== Organization ==
The Army was commanded by general Tadeusz Piskor; his chief of staff was colonel Jan Zawisza. Units:

- Warsaw Armoured Motorized Brigade (Warszawska Brygada Pancerno-Motorowa)
- Polish 39th Infantry Division
- Smaller units (Combined Cavalry Brigade; Sandomierz Operational Group; part of 2nd Regiment of Heavy Artillery)
