= Charge of Rokitna =

Cavalry charge by Polish Legions in 1915

- Part of the Eastern Front during World War I
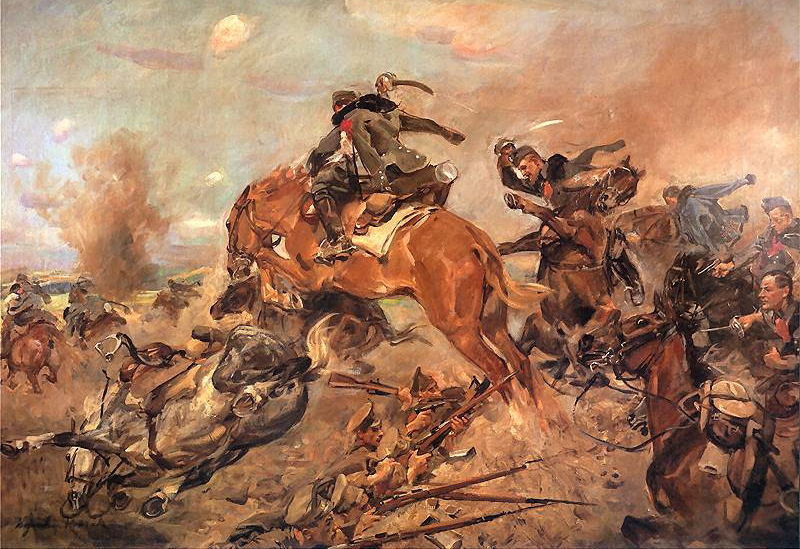
- Charge of Polish uhlans
Date	13 June 1915
Location	Rokytne, Bessarabia Governorate (present-day Ukraine)
Result	Austro-Hungarian victory

Belligerents
Austria-Hungary (Polish Legions)	Russian Empire

Commanders and leaders
Zbigniew Dunin-Wasowicz †	Unknown officer †

Strength
2nd Uhlans Regiment (73 uhlans)	Unknown

Casualties and losses
17 killed, 22 wounded, 8 in captivity	Unknown

The Charge of Rokitna (Polish: Szarża pod Rokitną) was a charge of a cavalry squadron of the 2nd Brigade of Polish Legions, fighting for the Austro-Hungarian Army. It took place on June 13, 1915 near the village of Rokytne, which at that time was part of Bessarabia Governorate (Russian Empire). A Polish squadron of 70 uhlans, led by Rittmeister Zbigniew Dunin-Wasowicz, attacked positions of the Imperial Russian Army. The battle resulted in a Polish pyrrhic victory: out of 70 soldiers, 17 Poles were killed and 23 were wounded. Russian losses are unknown.

== Background ==
In the spring of 1915, the 2nd Brigade was reorganized. It was divided into three tactical groups, commanded by Marian Januszajtis-Zegota, Józef Haller and Bolesław Roja. On April 1, 1915, Austrian Army Colonel Ferdinand Kuttner was named commandant of the 2nd Brigade. On April 17, Polish Legions were sent to Bukovina, where they became part of forces of General of Cavalry Ignaz Edler von Korda.

Third Legions Infantry Regiment was ordered to man frontline between the villages of Dobronowce (Dobronauti) and Toporowce (Toporivtsi). Polish artillery was at Balamutowka (Balamutca), uhlans of the 3rd squadron were in the area of Rarancza, while 2nd squadron stayed in the town of Kotul-Ostrica. In the first days of June, 2nd and 3rd uhlan squadrons were merged into the 2nd Regiment of the Legions Cavalry, under command of Rittmeister Zbigniew Dunin-Wasowicz.

== Charge ==
On June 12, 1915, the 2nd Brigade operated in the area of the villages Ridkivtsi, Austrian Bukovina and Rokytne, Russian Bessarabia. On both sides of it were units of the Austro-Hungarian Army: all forces initiated a joint attack on Russian positions. Despite heavy fighting, Polish and Austrian regiments failed to achieve their objectives.

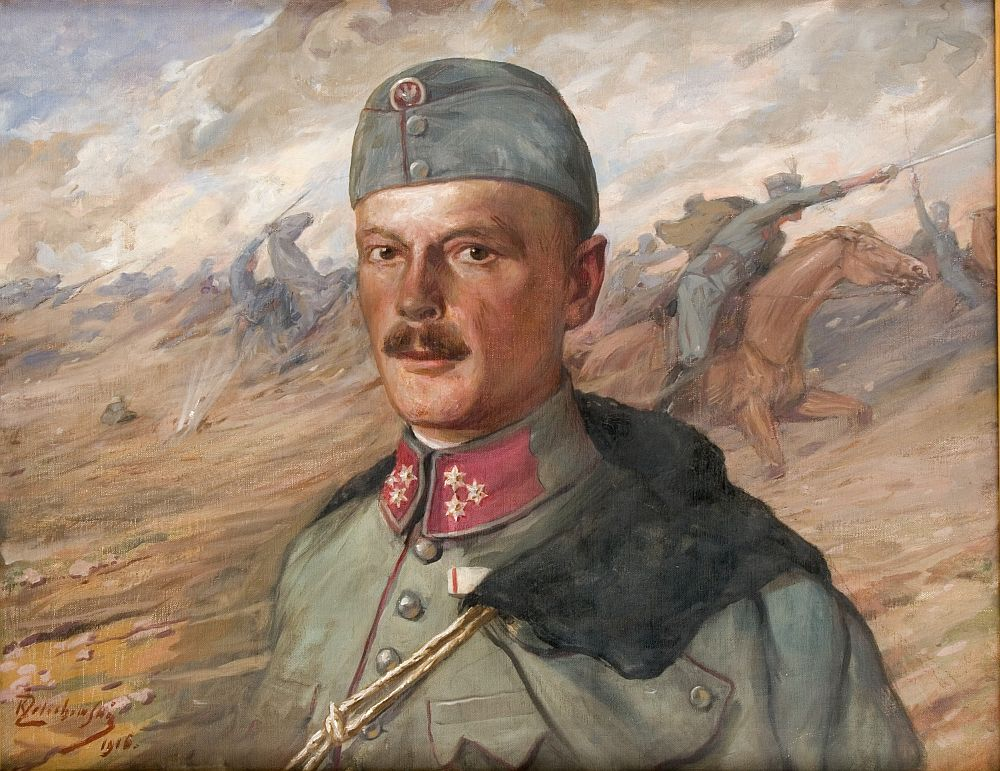
Zbigniew Dunin-Wasowicz

On June 13, in the early afternoon, the Russians began their advance from positions in the area of Rokitna. In order to halt the enemy, Austrian headquarters ordered Rittmeister Dunin-Wasowicz to carry out an attack with both uhlan squadrons of the 2nd Legions Brigade. They were to advance along the left wing, supporting Austrian infantry which simultaneously would attack Russian trenches.

Rittmeister Dunin-Wasowicz personally headed the charge: after crossing muddy banks of the Rokitnianka river, 3rd squadron was kept in reserve, while 2nd squadron charged. Within 15 minutes, Polish uhlans broke through three lines of Russian trenches. Polish losses were very high, but their sacrifice was not utilized, as the Austrian infantry failed to advance. Among those killed in action were Dunin-Wasowicz himself, also Colonel Jerzy Topor-Kisielnicki (commandant of 2nd squadron) and his deputy Roman Prawdzic-Wlodek.

== Aftermath ==
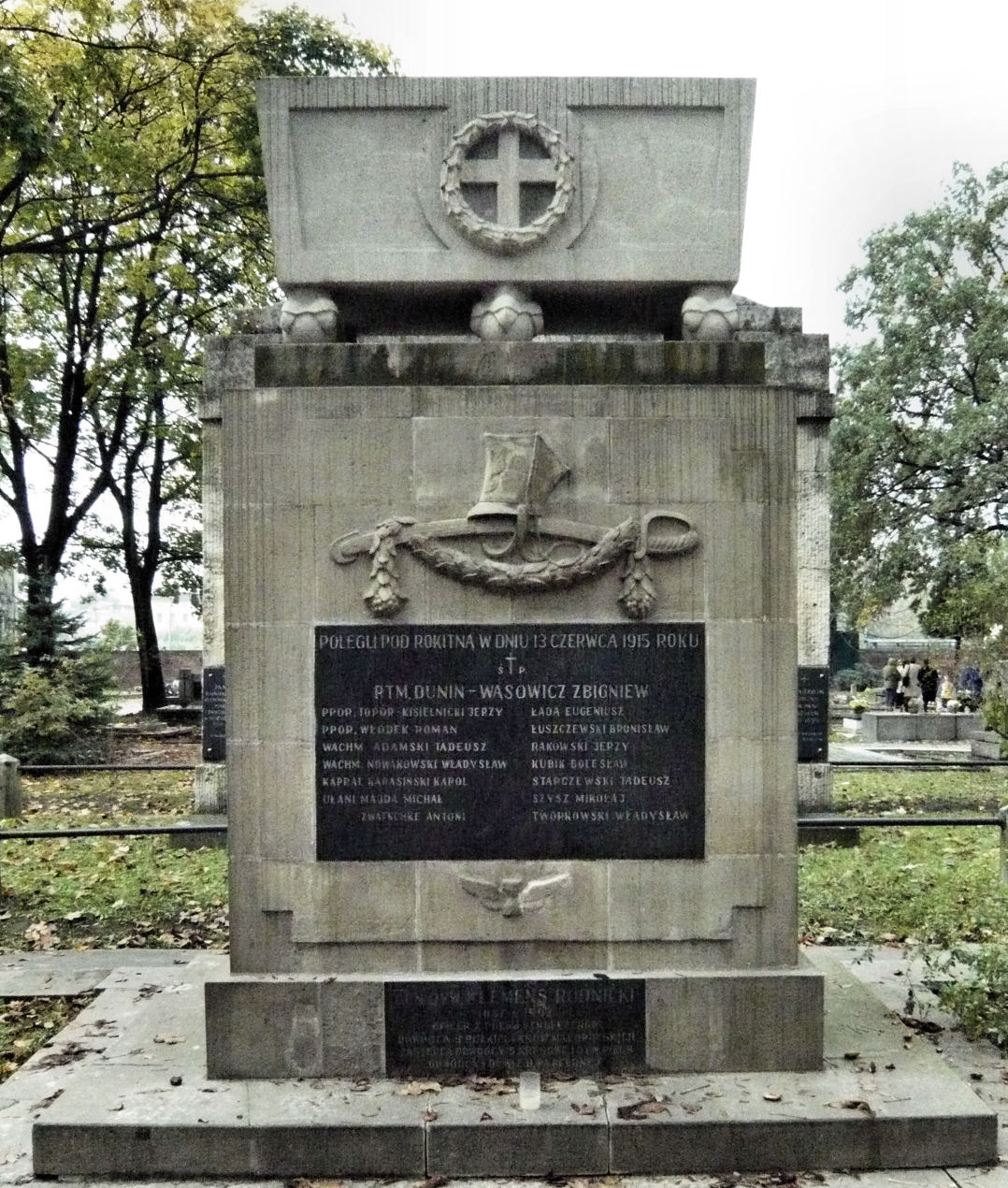
Monument of the uhlans, Rakowicki Cemetery

On June 15, 1915, at a cemetery in Rarancza, a funeral of uhlans killed in action took place. The service was led by Reverend Jozef Panas, coffin of Dunin-Wasowicz was covered with red cloth with Polish Eagle. Since in the interwar period the cemetery at Rarancza was part of Romania, a Polish ally (see Polish–Romanian alliance), Romanian 11th Rosiori Regiment took care of the tombs.

In February 1923, exhumation of bodies of Polish soldiers took place. All remains were transported to Poland, and on February 26, 1923, in Kraków, an official funeral took place, with such notable figures present at the ceremony, as Józef Piłsudski and Cardinal Adam Sapieha. Pilsudski posthumously awarded Virtuti Militari 5th Class to all soldiers. After the funeral, all coffins were transported to Rakowicki Cemetery. Two years later, a monument of the uhlans was unveiled there.

The Charge of Rokitna was the basis for a zurawiejka, "Song of the Squadron of Wasowicz". It also is mentioned in The Red Poppies on Monte Cassino, one of the best-known Polish military songs of World War II.

On the Tomb of the Unknown Soldier, Warsaw, the charge is mentioned as "ROKITNA 13 VI 1915".

== See also ==
- Żurawiejka
- Polish Cavalry Monument
- Battle of Komarów
- Polish Legions in World War I
- Polish cavalry

== Sources ==
- August Krasicki: Dziennik z kampanii rosyjskiej 1914–1916. Warszawa: Instytut Wydawniczy PAX, 1988. ISBN 83-211-1000-2.
- Stanisław Jan Rostworowski: Nie tylko Pierwsza Brygada (1914–1918) – Z Legionami na bój. Warszawa: P. W. EGROS – Oficyna Wydawnicza, 1993. ISBN 83-85253-05-X.
- Andrzej Czesław Żak Rokitna 1915 Wydawnictwo Bellona, Warszawa 1994, ISBN 83-11-08294-4.
- Wacław Lipiński: Walka zbrojna o niepodległość Polski w latach 1905–1918. Warszawa: "Wolumen"
