= 12th Podolian Uhlan Regiment =

12th Podolian Uhlan Regiment (Polish language: 12 Pułk Ułanów Podolskich, 12 puł) was a cavalry unit of the Polish Army. It was officially formed in 1919, and existed in various forms until 1947. The regiment fought in Polish-Soviet War and World War II. In the Second Polish Republic, it was garrisoned in the village of Bialokrynica near Krzemieniec, Volhynia (current Ukraine). The regiment was part of Wolynska Cavalry Brigade.

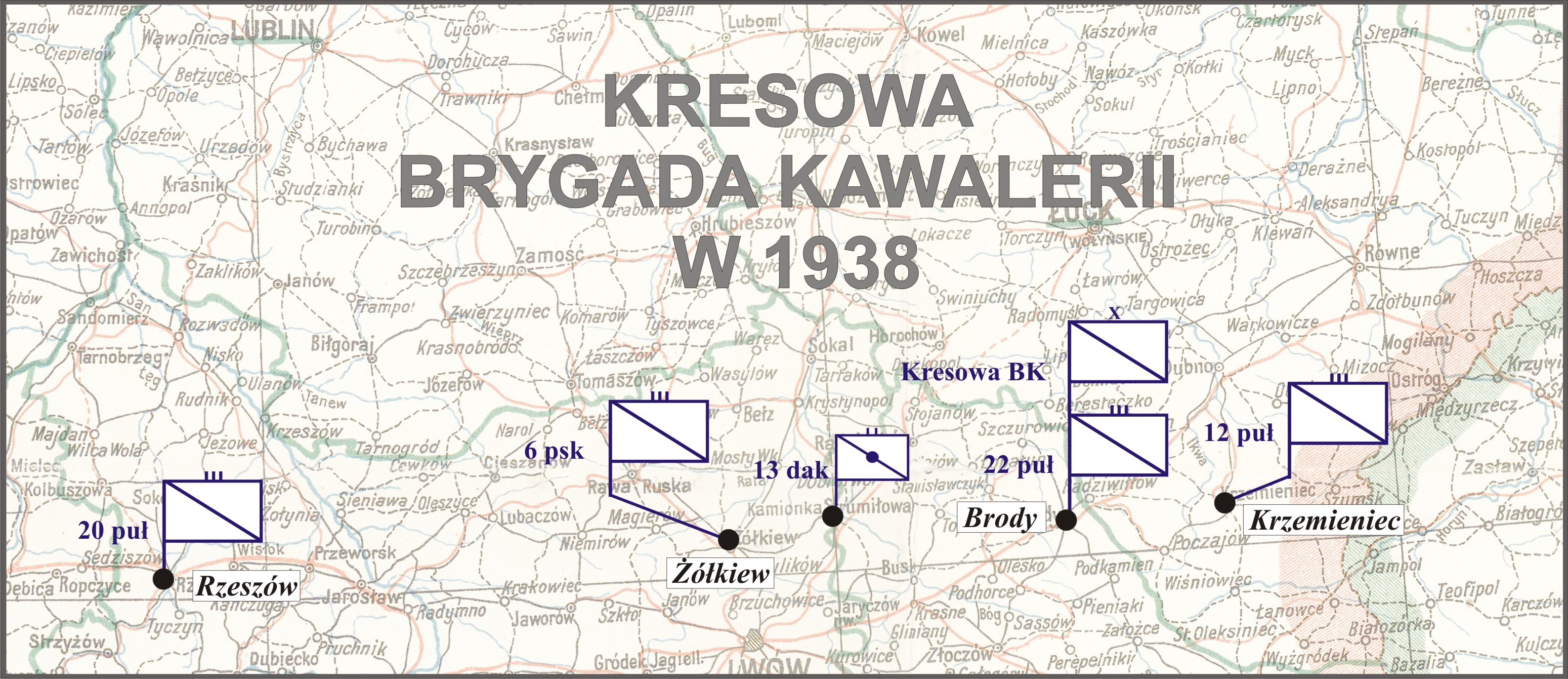
Kresowa BK w 1938

== Origins ==
The 12th Podolian Uhlan Regiment is rooted in the Duchy of Warsaw. On June 8, 1809, the 5th Galician-French Cavalry Regiment was formed by Colonel Gabriel Rzyszczewski. Soon afterwards, it was renamed the 12th Uhlan Regiment.

During the November Uprising of 1830-31, the regiment was re-formed by the rebels in former Grand Duchy of Lithuania. It fought the Russians in the region of Samogitia, and was disbanded in late 1831.

== Second Polish Republic ==
In February 1919, the regiment was formed once more. It was based on cavalry units of the former Imperial Russian Army, in which ethnic Poles were in the majority, such as the 1st Guards Cuirassier Regiment. Commanded by Rotmistrz Antoni Czudowski, it was initially called the 1st Polish Cuirassier Regiment.

In late 1918, during the Polish-Ukrainian War, a volunteer cavalry squadron was formed in the area of Lwow. After a merger with a similar unit formed in Warsaw, it was named the 12th Relief of Lwow Regiment. On May 7, 1919, the unit was awarded its flag, funded by the Polish noble family of Belina-Brzozowski, which resided in Podolia. Two days later, its two squadrons set off to fight in eastern Austrian Galicia, capturing the towns of Boryslaw and Bolechow. On October 25, 1919, the regiment was officially named Podolian, after the region in which it fought. Soon afterwards, it was transferred to Pomerelia, where it took part in Poland's Wedding to the Sea.

During the Polish-Soviet War, Podolian Uhlans, as part of Third Cavalry Brigade, fought in Volhynia, an eastern part of former Austrian Galicia. On August 12, 1920, the 1st Cavalry Division was formed. It consisted of elite cavalry regiments of the Polish Army: 1st Krechowce Uhlan Regiment, 12th Podolian Uhlan Regiment and 14th Regiment of Jazlowiec Uhlans. The division fought in the Battle of Radziechow and then in the great cavalry Battle of Komarow.

After the wars had ended, the regiment was garrisoned in the village of Bialokrynica near Krzemieniec, Volhynia (current Ukraine). On February 2, 1921, a new flag was handed to the regiment by Marshal Jozef Pilsudski. The flag was founded by regimental officer, Rotmistrz Michal Grocholski. Two years later, a regimental holiday was established on May 7. A delegation of the unit took part in the funeral of Marshal Pilsudski, in May 1935 in Warsaw. On April 1, 1937, the Second Independent Cavalry Brigade was renamed the Kresowa Cavalry Brigade. The regiment was part of this brigade until its mobilization in August 1939.

== 1939 Invasion of Poland ==
During the mobilization of the Polish Army (summer 1939), 12th Podolian Uhlan Regiment was transferred from Kresowa Cavalry Brigade to Wolynska Cavalry Brigade, commanded by Colonel Julian Filipowicz. As part of the brigade, the regiment fought against the advancing panzer Wehrmacht units in the Battle of Mokra and other battles of the Polish defensive war.

In early September 1939, Colonel Andrzej Kuczek, who commanded the regiment, ordered the flag to be transported back to the barracks in Bialokrynica, Volhynia. On the morning of September 17, 1939, when news of Soviet Invasion of Poland reached Bialokrynica, the flag was taken southwards, but it did not reach Romania, as on September 19 in the morning near Zloczow, it was burned by Rotmistrz Jan Chojnacki, who did not want the flag to fall into Soviet hands.

The regiment fought until early October 1939, and its commandant, Colonel Kuczek, was murdered in the Katyn massacre. After the campaign, the regiment was awarded the Virtuti Militari.

== Podolian Uhlans in the Soviet Union and Italy ==
Following the Sikorski–Mayski agreement, the so-called Anders' Army was created in the Soviet Union, out of Poles who had forcibly been resettled in Siberia and other provinces of the country. Among other units, Personal Squadron of General Anders was created, under Rotmistrz Czeslaw Florkowski. In January 1942, the squadron was transported to Tashkent, and in October of that year, by which time it was in Iran, it was renamed the 12th Armoured Cavalry Regiment. In May 1943, the regiment was attached to the 3rd Carpathian Rifle Division, and in December it was renamed the 12th Podolian Rifles Regiment.

As part of II Corps (Poland), the regiment was first transported to Palestine, and then to North Africa. In January 1944, it was conveyed to Italy, and later fought in the Battle of Monte Cassino, during which the Podolian Uhlans were the first to capture the strategic hill. The regiment continued fighting until the end of the Italian Campaign. After the war, the regiment remained in Italy until October 1946. A new flag was handed to it during a special ceremony, which took place on November 11, 1945.

In October 1946 the regiment was loaded on a ship in Naples, and transported to Great Britain. It was dissolved on May 6, 1947. On the next day, the Association of Soldiers of the 12th Podolian Uhlan Regiment was formed.

== Commandants ==
- Rotmistrz Wlodzimierz Kownacki (1918),
- Colonel Henryk Kuncman (KIA 1918),
- Rotmistrz Hamilkar Szeliski (KIA 1918)
- Colonel Józef Tokarzewski (1919-1920, WIA)
- Major Zygmunt Rudnicki (1920),
- Colonel Stanislaw Szantyr (1920),
- Rotmistrz Antoni Szuszkiewicz (1920),
- Major Zbigniew Brochwicz-Lewiƒski (WIA 1920),
- Rotmistrz Tadeusz Komorowski (WIA 1920),
- Rotmistrz Tadeusz Dziewicki (1920),
- Colonel Mikolaj Koiszewski (1921-1924),
- Colonel Zygmunt Rudnicki (1924-1929)
- Colonel Rudolf Rupp (1929-1931)
- Colonel Bronislaw Rakowski (1931-1936)
- Colonel Andrzej Kuczek (1936-1939, murdered in Katyn massacre)

== Symbols and traditions ==
The first flag of the regiment was burned by its officers on September 19, 1939. A second flag, founded by airmen of the Polish Airforce in the West, was handed to General Anders, on November 11, 1945, in Italy. The flag, which featured Our Lady of the Gate of Dawn, is now kept at the Polish Institute and General Sikorski Museum in London.

The regimental badge, accepted by Polish military authorities on February 28, 1922, featured the yellow Podolian sun and the Maltese cross.

On May 7, 1997, the 12th Recce Battalion of Podolian Uhlans, garrisoned in Szczecin, officially took over the symbols and traditions of the Podolian Uhlans.

== Sources ==
- Wojsko Polskie 1939-1945 - Barwa i broń. Warszawa: 1984
- Ułani Podolscy. Dzieje Pułku Ułanów Podolskich 1809-1947, oprac. zbiorowe pod red. Kazimierza Grocholskiego, reprint, Zakład Narodowy im. Ossolińskich Wydawnictwo, Wrocław 1991

== See also ==
- Polish cavalry
