= 21st Vistula Uhlan Regiment =

21st Vistula Lancers Regiment (Polish: 21 Pułk Ułanów Nadwiślańskich, 21 puł) was a cavalry unit of the Polish Army in the Second Polish Republic. Formed in 1920, it fought both in the Polish–Soviet War and the Invasion of Poland. The regiment was garrisoned in the town of Rowne, Volhynia, and in 1939 belonged to Volhynian Cavalry Brigade.

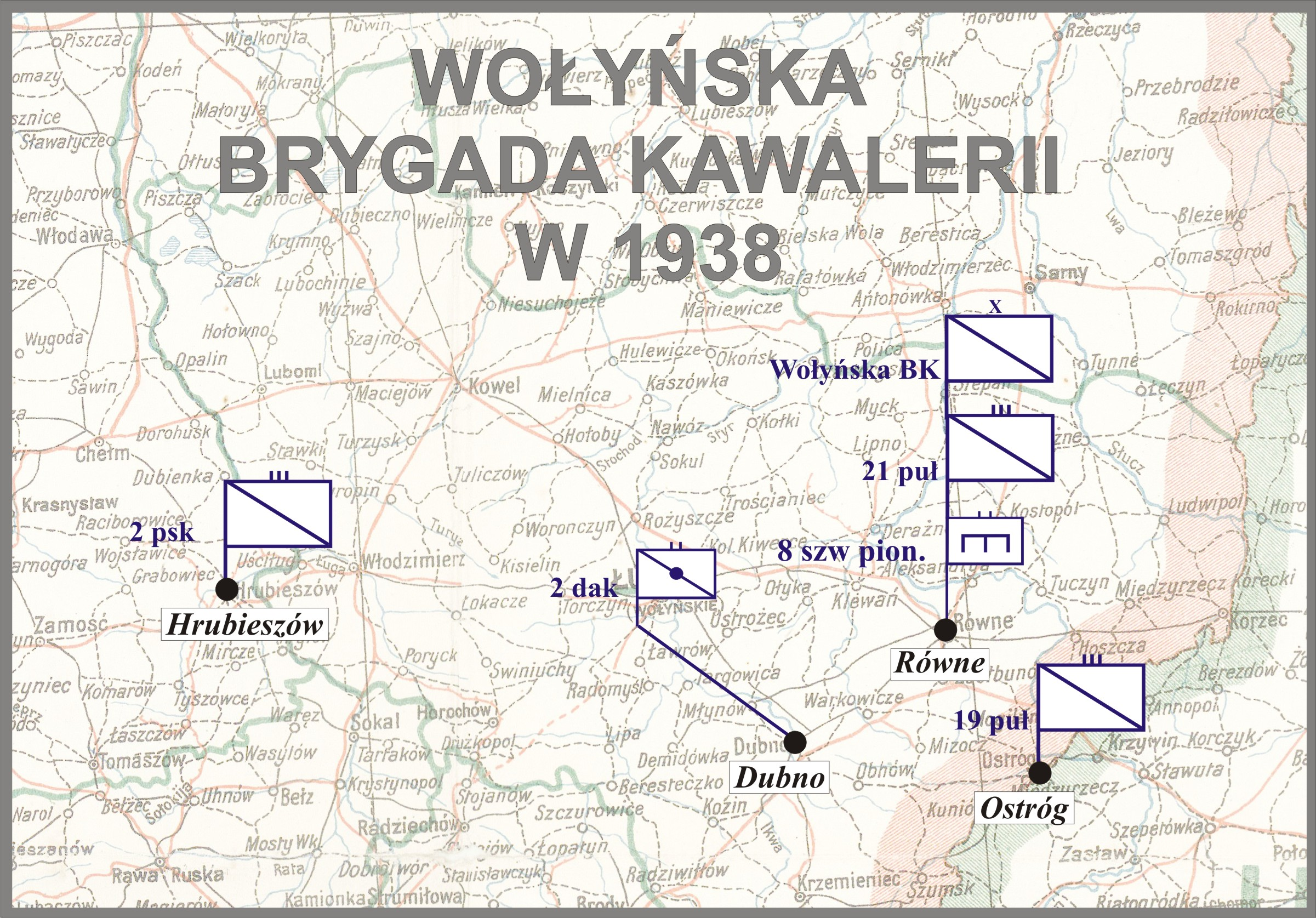
Wołyńska BK w 1938

== Beginnings ==
The regiment was formed in July 1920, during the Polish–Soviet War, as the 11th Mounted Border Rifles Regiment (11 Pulk Konnych Strzelcow Granicznych). Its cadre consisted of NCOs, trained at two military schools, in Ciechanów and Stara Wies near Warsaw. Due to efforts of Colonel Bronislaw Zaniewski, who commanded the Border Rifles, a cavalry regiment was created, based on the NCOs from both schools. On July 24, 1920, NCO's from Ciechanów, commanded by Bohdan Dabrowski, arrived at Stara Wies, and Dabrowski himself was appointed commandant of the whole regiment.

In early August 1920, Colonel Aleksander Kunicki arrived at Stara Wies. His task was to form four squadrons and a platoon of heavy machine guns. On August 7, the regiment was placed under authority of the military governor of Warsaw, who ordered it to march towards Radzymin and then Stara Milosna, on August 8, 1920. The Vistula Uhlans fought with distinction in the Battle of Warsaw (1920).

On August 16, 1920, the regiment was transported by rail to Kutno, and then marched off to Płock. As Polish offensive had begun, the regiment crossed the Vistula near Wyszogród (August 20), chasing after the retreating Soviet cavalry of Hayk Bzhishkyan. Unable to escape Polish encirclement, Soviet forces entered East Prussia near Kolno.

By early September 1920, the regiment was stationed near Ciechanów, and on September 17, it was ordered to march to Pruszków near Warsaw, where it remained until September 27, when it was moved by rail to Sokółka, to fight the Lithuanians, who supported the Soviets in the Battle of the Niemen River. On October 5, the regiment captured Ejszyszki, and on October 14, it was ordered to protect the rail line from Grodno to Wilno. Since a number of Soviet and Lithuanian soldiers remained in local forests, the regiment had to fight them almost daily.

On October 20, 1920, the unit was named 21st Vistula Uhlan Regiment, and was ordered to guard Polish–Lithuanian demarcation line. It continued this service until January 15, 1921, when it was moved to Woronowo. On March 2, 1921, the regiment moved to the villages in the area of Baranowicze, and in the summer 1921, it was transferred again, to Horodziej. Finally, in early September 1921, the unit was loaded on a train, and transported to Rowne, where it remained until 1939.

In March 1921, Polish military authorities decided to name the regiment after the Vistula river, as it claimed to continue the traditions of the Legion of the Vistula, which fought in the Napoleonic Wars.

During the 1939 Invasion of Poland, the unit was part of Wołyńska Cavalry Brigade, fighting in the Battle of Mokra, the Battle of Ostrowy and the Battle of Wola Cyrusowa. After losing 85% of its manpower, the regiment ceased to exist by September 10, 1939. Its elements managed to get to the besieged Warsaw, where they continued fighting.

== Commandants ==
- Major Bohdan Dabrowski (1920),
- Colonel Aleksander Kunicki (1920),
- Rotmistrz Aleksander Obertynski (1920),
- Colonel Aleksander Kunicki (1920–1923),
- Colonel Wladyslaw Antoni Rozlau (1923 – 12 III 1929),
- Colonel Roman Jozef Safar (22 III 1929 – VIII 1939),
- Colonel Kazimierz Suski de Rostwo (VIII – IX 1939)

== Symbols and traditions ==
The regimental flag, funded by the residents of Volhynia, was handed to the unit in Rowne in June 1924. It featured the Polish eagle, from the 16th century, the coat of arms of Volhynia, the number 21, and the inscription "Honour and Fatherland". The fate of the flag is unknown, as in September 1939 it was buried somewhere near Hrubieszów.

The regimental badge was shaped after the Maltese cross, with the inscription 21 U. The regiment had its own zurawiejka.

== Sources ==
- Kazimierz Satora: Opowieści wrześniowych sztandarów. Warszawa: Instytut Wydawniczy Pax, 1990
- Tadeusz Plackowski: Zarys historji wojennej 21 Pułku Ułanów Nadwiślańskich. Warszawa: Wojskowe Biuro Historyczne, 1930

== See also ==
- Polish cavalry
