= Zbigniew Dunin-Wasowicz =

Polish military leader (1882–1915)

Zbigniew Dunin-Wąsowicz
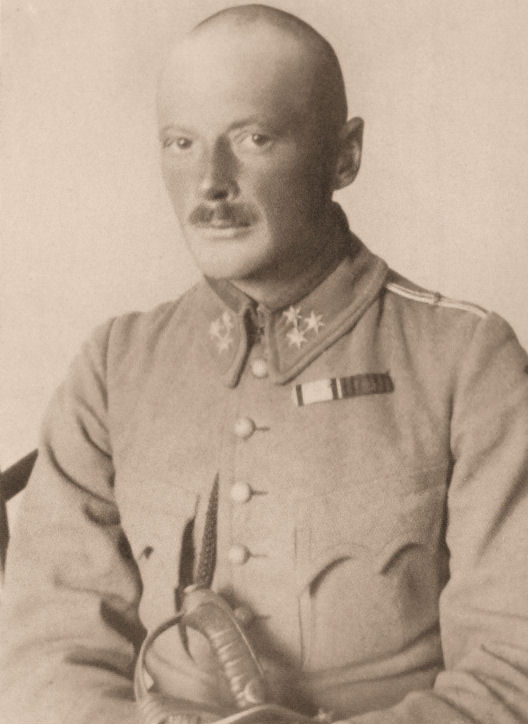
- Born: 14 October 1882; Berezhany
- Died: 13 June 1915 (aged 32); Rokytne
- Military career
- Allegiance: Austro-Hungary
- Branch: Austro-Hungarian Army; Polish Legions
- Service years: 1905-1915
- Rank: Rotmistrz (Captain)
- Unit: 2nd Cavalry Division of the 2nd Brigade, Polish Legions
- Commands: Commander of the Cavalary Division
- Conflicts: First World War
- Awards: Silver Cross of Virtuti Militari; Cross of Independence

Zbigniew Dymitr Dunin-Wasowicz (born October 14, 1882, in Brzeżany, Austrian Galicia, died June 13, 1915, in Rokitna, Austrian Bukovina), was a Polish military leader, Rittmeister of Polish Legions in World War I.

== Family ==
He was the son of Boleslaw Dunin-Wasowicz, a local nobleman, officer of the Imperial Austrian Army and chamberlain at the imperial court. Furthermore, his grandfather, Mikolaj Dunin-Wasowicz, was a Chevau-léger during Napoleonic Wars, who fought in the Battle of Somosierra.

== Military career ==
After graduation from military cadet school in Lobzow (now a district of Kraków), Dunin-Wasowicz became a professional officer of the Austro-Hungarian Army. In 1910, he became Second Lieutenant of Cavalry, serving in the 13th Cavalry Regiment. In 1912 he was transferred to reserve, and became an active participant of Polish paramilitary unit, the Riflemen's Association. In August 1914, after mobilization had been announced, he came to Kraków and on August 11 was named commandant of a mounted unit of the Sokol movement.

Together with his unit, Dunin-Wasowicz crossed the pre-1914 border between Austrian Galicia and Congress Poland. He fought the Russians in the area of Kielce, and on August 23 was sent back to Kraków, charged with training of additional cavalry units of Polish Legions in World War I. There, he formed 2nd and 3rd squadrons, and in early September 1914 was named commandant of the 2nd squadron.

In October 1914, both squadrons were sent to Hungary, and then to Eastern Galicia, where on October 26 in Cyculow near Stanisławów, 2nd squadron was involved in its first clash with Russians. In recognition of his services and bravery, on November 2 Dunin-Wasowicz was promoted to the rank of Rittmeister. In late November and early December 1914, he fought with his unit in the area inhabited by Hutsuls, and in January 1915, Dunin-Wasowicz 2nd squadron was transferred to Bukovina, to repel Russian invasion of this province.

Zbigniew Dunin-Wasowicz was killed on June 13, 1915, in the Charge of Rokitna. He was commemorated in one of the first zurawiejkas, called “Song of Wasowicz’s Squadron”: “Our Wasowicz, a great guy, beat up the Moskals in Cucylowa. Second squadron distinguished itself, by shedding streams of enemy blood”.

He was buried at Rakowicki Cemetery in Kraków: mass funeral of uhlans killed at Rokitna took place on February 25, 1923. A street in Kraków was named after him. Dunin-Wasowicz was posthumously awarded Silver Cross of the Virtuti Militari and Cross of Independence.

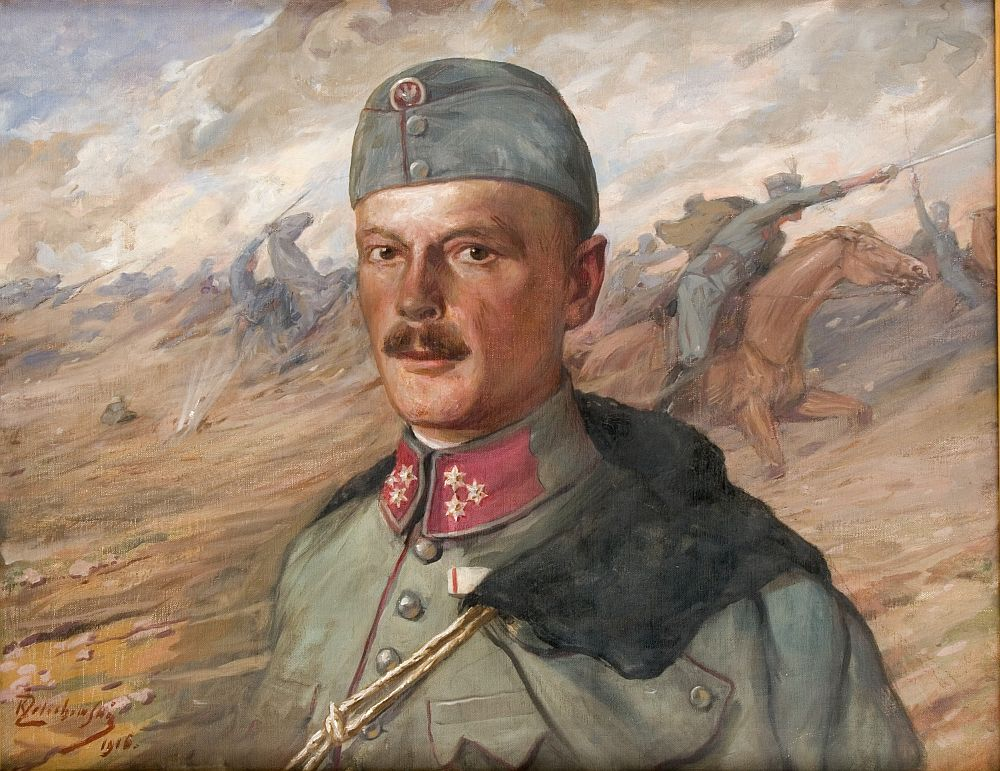
Dunin-Wasowicz, possibly at Rokitna.

== See also ==
- Charge of Rokitna
- Polish Legions in World War I

== Sources ==
- Marian Kukiel, Dzieje polityczne Europy od rewolucji francuskiej 1789–1921, Londyn: PULS Publications, 1992
- August Krasicki Dziennik z kampanii rosyjskiej 1914-1926 Instytut Wydawniczy PAX, Warszawa 1988.
- Stanisław Rostworowski Nie Tylko Pierwsza Brygada (1914–1918) Z Legionami na bój P.W. EGROSS – Oficyna Wydawnicza, Warszawa 1993, ISBN 83-85253-05-X
- Andrzej Czesław Żak Rokitna 1915 Wydawnictwo Bellona, Warszawa 1994, ISBN 83-11-08294-4.
- Wacław Lipiński Walka zbrojna o niepodległość Polski w latach 1905-1918 Oficyna Wydawnicza VOLUMEN, Warszawa 1990, ISBN 83-85218-00-9 (przedruk z 1935 roku).
- Michał Klimecki, Władysław Klimczak Legiony Polskie, Bellona, Warszawa 1990, ISBN 83-11-07863-7.
- Cezary Leżeński / Lesław Kukawski: O kawalerii polskiej XX wieku. Wrocław: Zakład Narodowy im. Ossolińskich, 1991, s. 25. ISBN 83-04-03364-X.
