= Leonard Żłób =

Leonard Żłób was a Corporal of the Polish Army and a commander of a Bofors wz. 37 AT gun of the 2nd Mounted Artillery Battalion attached to the Wołyńska Cavalry Brigade. During the Battle of Mokra of 1 September 1939 he was the only soldier of his battery to survive a close-quarter struggle against German tanks. For his command of the gun, with which he destroyed 14 enemy tanks, he was awarded with the Virtuti Militari medal as the first soldier during the Invasion of Poland (1939).
