= 19th Volhynian Uhlan Regiment =

19th Volhynian Lancers Regiment (Polish language: 19. Pułk Ułanów Wołyńskich, 19 puł) was a cavalry unit and brigade from the Polish Army in the Second Polish Republic. Formed in 1917, it fought in the Polish–Soviet War and the Invasion of Poland. In the interbellum period, the regiment was garrisoned in Ostrog, Volhynia.

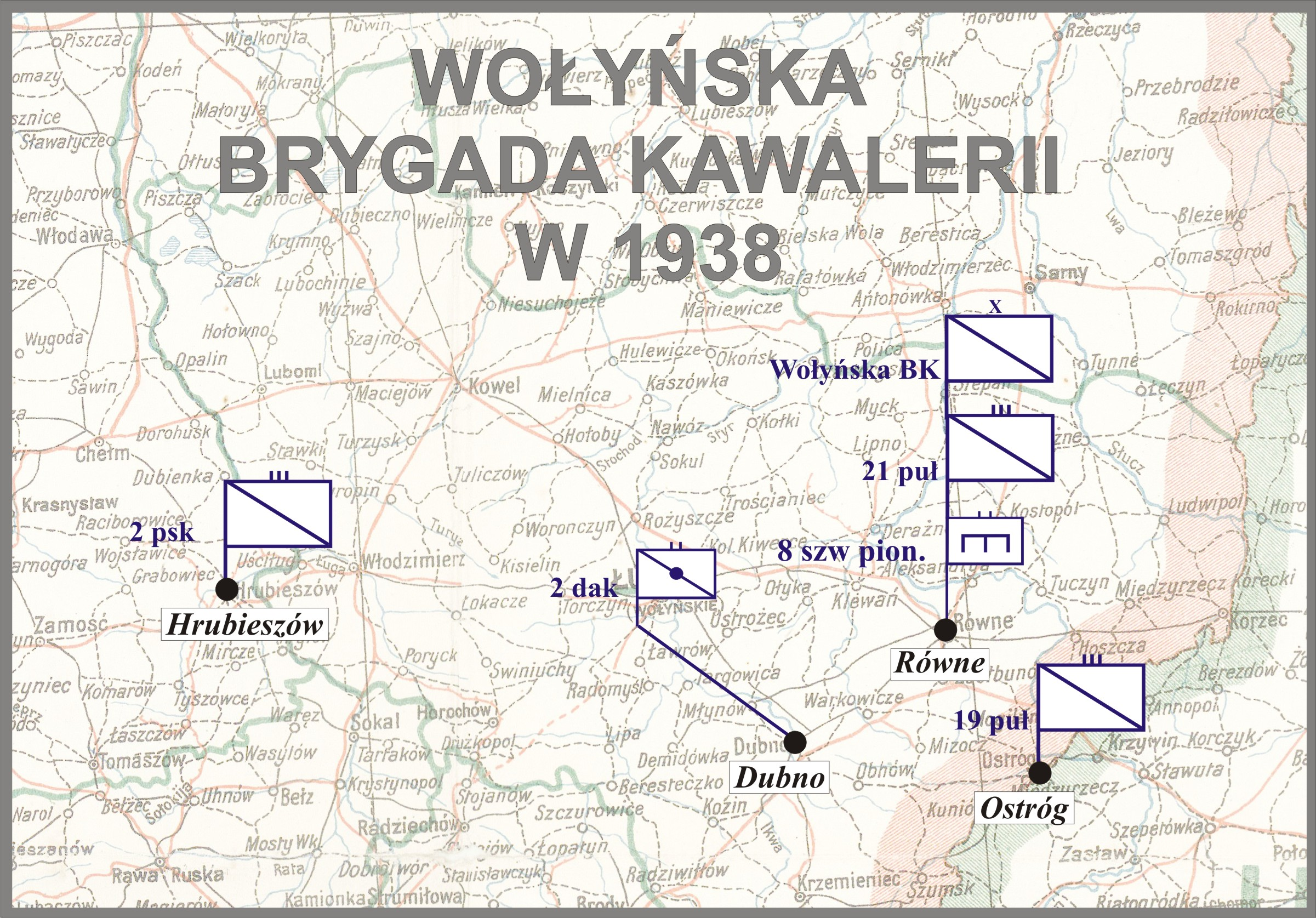
Wołyńska BK w 1938

The origins of the regiment date back to April 1917, when Polish Assault Hussar Squadron was formed in Ukraine, by Colonel Feliks Jaworski. This unit was part of Polish Rifle Division, Imperial Russian Army. In early June 1917, the squadron was transported to Eastern Galicia, where it fought against German and Austro-Hungarian forces. After the October Revolution, it was transferred to Ploskirow, where it fought against Bolshevik units and demoralized soldiers of the Russian Army. On December 24, it was merged into Polish Army in Ukraine, and in January 1918, the 2nd Lancers Regiment was formed, based on Polish Assault Hussar Squadron. On February 22, 1918, the regiment was annexed into III Polish Corps in Russia, as part of Light Brigade of Colonel Juliusz Rómmel.

By June 1918, the regiment had 26 officers and 684 soldiers.

During the 1939 Invasion of Poland, the regiment, as part of Volhynian Cavalry Brigade, fought in the Battle of Mokra, Battle of Wola Cyrusowa and other battles. By mid-September 1939, it ceased to exist, and its elements, after crossing the Wieprz river, joined Kresowa Cavalry Brigade, to surrender to the Red Army in late September.

The 19th Volhynian Lancers Regiment was recreated in early 1944, as part of 27th Home Army Infantry Division.

== Commandants ==
- Major Feliks Jaworski (1917–1921)
- Colonel Michal Cienski (27 II 1921 – 10 VI 1922)
- Colonel Mscislaw Butkiewicz (VI – VIII 1922)
- Colonel Zbigniew Brochwicz-Lewinski (20 VIII 1922 – 6 X 1927)
- Colonel Wkodzimierz Kazimierz Bogusz-Roland (1 IX 1927 – 12 III 1929)
- Colonel Aleksander Piotraszewski (III 1929 – 1937)
- Colonel Dezyderiusz Zawistowski (1937–1938)
- Colonel Jozef Petkowski (1938 – IX 1939)

== Symbols and Traditions ==
Regimental flag, funded by the residents of Volhynia, was handed to the unit by Marshal Józef Piłsudski, on August 6, 1924, in Ostrog. The regimental badge featured the coat of arms of Volhynian Voivodeship. The regiment also had its own zurawiejka.

The 204th Elementary School in Warsaw was in 1993 named after the regiment. There are two organizations dealing with the history of the regiment : Rodzina 19 Pułku Ułanów Wołyńskich w Warszawie /Family of the 19 Regiment of Volhynian Uhlans in Warsaw/ and Stowarzyszenie Pamięci 19 Pułku Ułanów Wołyńskich w Opolu /Association for the Memory of the 19 Regiment of Vohlynian Uhlans in Opole/.

== Sources ==
- Dezyderiusz J. Zawistowski, Zarys historii wojennej 19-go Pułku Ułanów Wołyńskich im. płk. Karola Różyckiego, Warszawa 1930
- Mieczysław Bielski: Grupa Operacyjna „Piotrków” 1939. Warszawa: Wydawnictwo Bellona, 1991

== See also ==
- Polish cavalry
