= Volhynian Cavalry Brigade =

Polish cavalry brigade

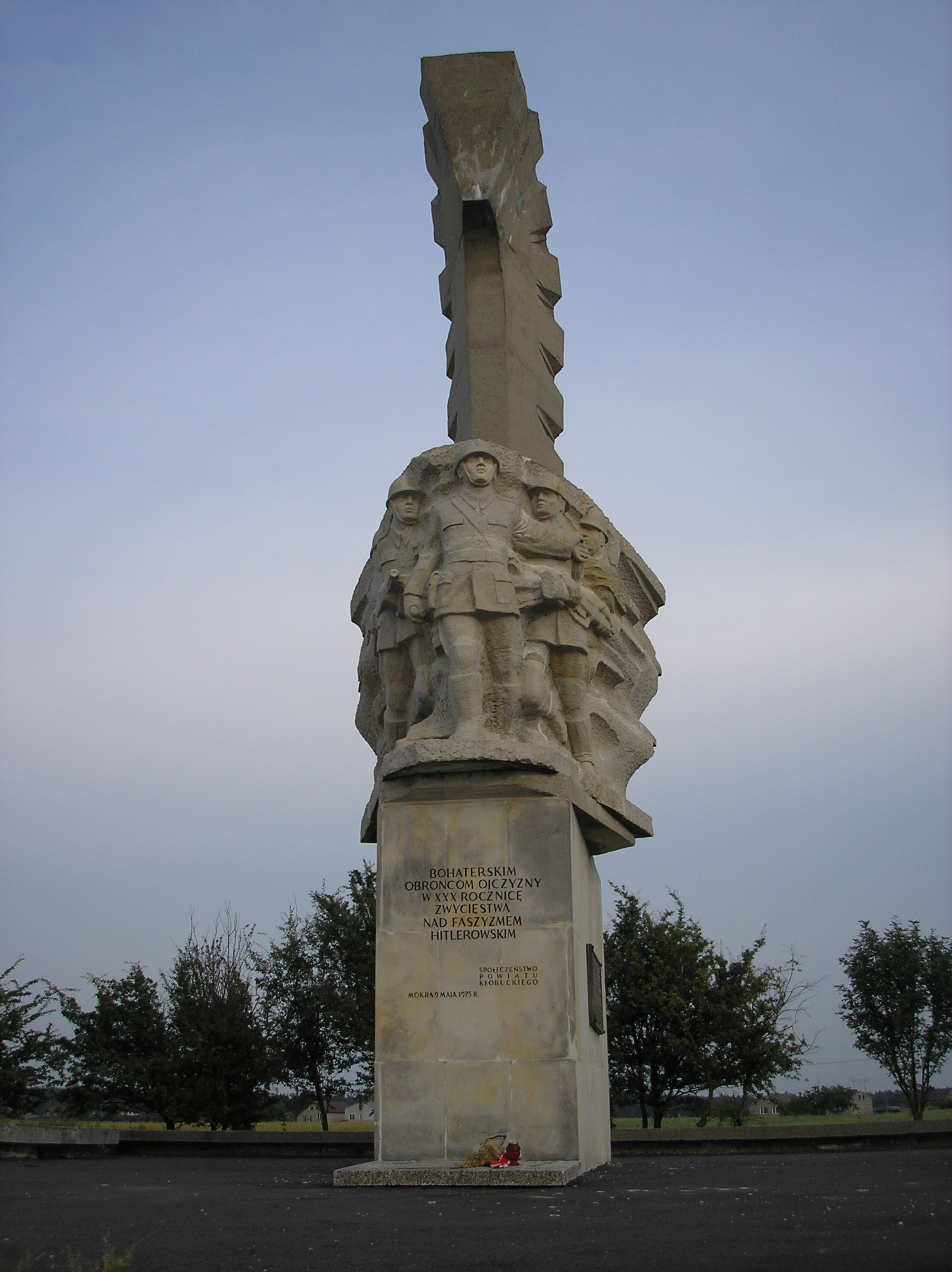
Monument to the Volhynian Cavalry Brigade in Mokra

The Volhynian Cavalry Brigade (Polish: Wołyńska Brygada Kawalerii) was a Polish cavalry brigade, which saw action against the invading Germans during the Invasion of Poland, a part of World War II. Raised from recruits in the area of Wołyń, the division was posted to the Łódź Army. During several desperate counter-attacks, the brigade suffered heavy casualties near Łódź. It was commanded by Colonel Julian Filipowicz. Most notably, the unit took part in one of the first battles of the German invasion of Poland (and thus, World War II), the battle of Mokra.

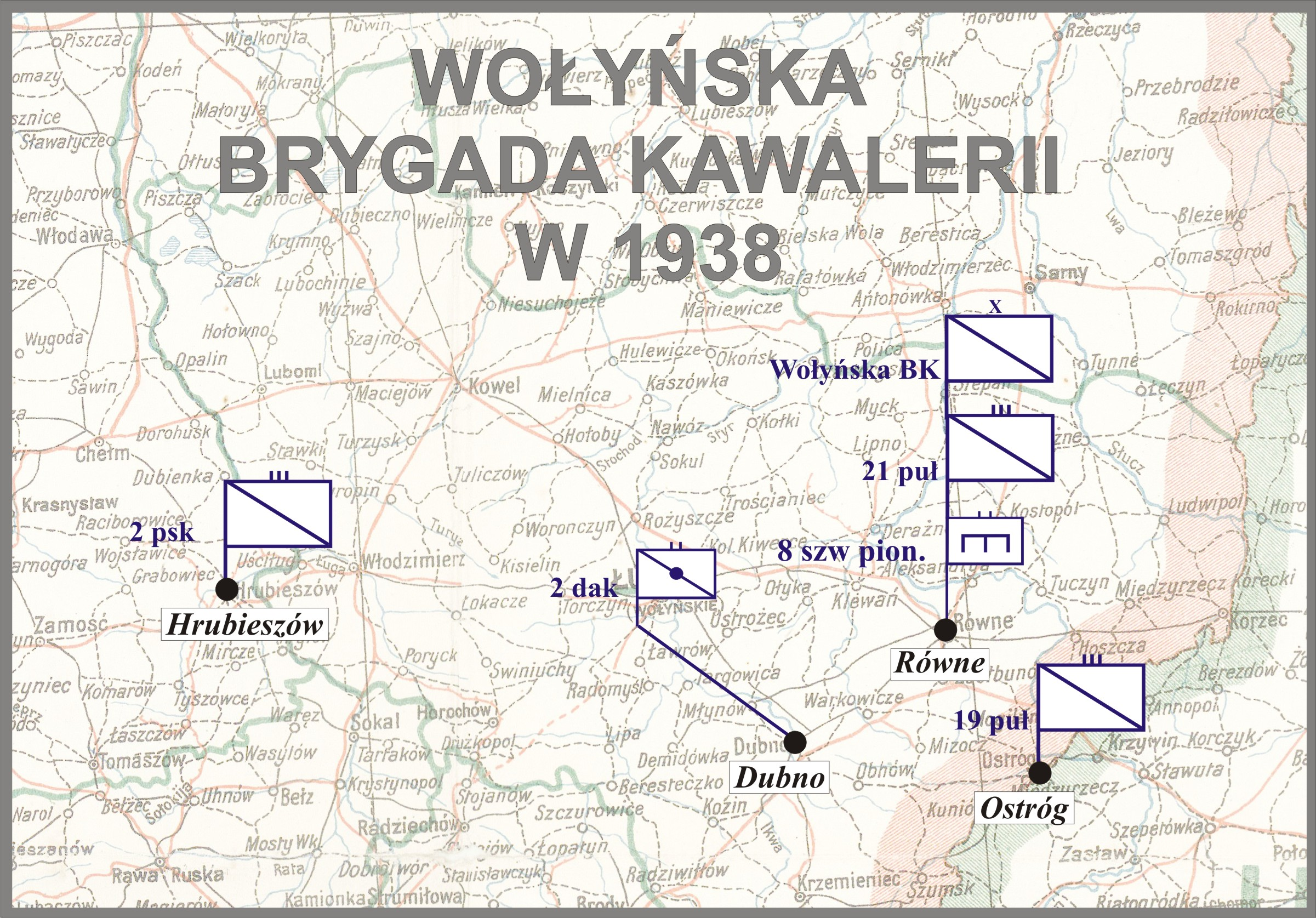
Wołyńska BK w 1938

== History ==
The Vohlynian Cavalry Brigade was formed on April 1, 1937, out of sub-units of the Równe Cavalry Brigade, and several smaller detachments. Formed out of recruits from the region of Volhynia, the brigade was decentralized and its units stationed in several towns from the region, including Równe, Dubno, Białokrynica and Ostróg by the Horyń. As part of the first wave of the Polish Army, the brigade was fully mobilized prior to the outbreak of World War II, and transported to the area of Łódź. In accordance with the Polish mobilization scheme, the brigade was attached to Wiktor Thommées, Piotrków Operational Group, of the Łódź Army. The brigade was to form that unit's mobile reserve and cover the planned retreat of the 7th Infantry Division.

After the beginning of the Invasion of Poland on September 1, 1939, the unit took part in the battle of Mokra, where it held its ground although with heavy losses. The brigade withdrew towards the east, and the following day defended the second line of defense near Ostrowy, where it suffered further casualties. On 2 Sept., the brigade held up the 4th Panzer Division (Wehrmacht). On September 3, it reached the main line of defense of the Army along the Warta-Widawka line (Łękińsko-Łękawa-Janów). With its flanks covered from both sides, the 2nd Mounted Rifles Regiment made a successful sortie towards the village of Kamieńsk, on September 4, where it surprised the German 4th Panzer Division, and destroyed several of its tanks and a dozen of its fuel tanks, killing approximately 100 enemy soldiers. The following day, the entire brigade took part in a sortie towards the village of Wola Krzysztoporska and Jeżów, but were forced back after a German counter-attack.

On September 7, 1939, the German forces finally managed to break through the lines of the Łódź Army and the brigade was forced to retreat after a skirmish against the German 18th Infantry Division near the villages of Zamość and Żeromin, both near the town of Tuszyn. Withdrawing towards Andrespol, on September 8, the unit entered the battle of Wola Cyrusowa, where it covered the western and northern flanks of the entire army, withdrawing eastwards. The result of the day-long battle against the German 10th Infantry Division, was that the Volhynian Brigade suffered significant losses. As the sun set, the Poles withdrew to the other side of the Mroga river and then towards Chlebów, where it spent the several hours to reorganize. Due to the fast pace of German armoured assault, the brigade had to retreat further eastwards and on September 10, it reached the Kampinos Forest through Miedniewice, Szymanów and Kampinos.

The brigade spent the following two days in the forests halfway between Warsaw and Modlin. It was joined by the retreating Nowogródzka Cavalry Brigade, and received some reinforcements, although it was already in bad shape. By September 13, both units started a counter-assault in the direction of the town of Mińsk Mazowiecki. By now the brigade, was reduced to less than 50% of its original strength, but managed to retake the village of Cyganka, and continue its counter offensive towards Choszczówka, but a German counter-attack broke its momentum and forced them to retreat.

After the battle, the brigade ceased to exist as an organized force. The 21st Uhlan Regiment and the remnants of the 12th withdrew to Warsaw, where they fought in the defense of Warsaw until September 28, in the ranks of Roman Abraham's Combined Cavalry Brigade. The remaining forces of the brigade joined the forces of General Stefan Dąb-Biernacki's Northern Front and withdrew further eastwards, towards the Bug River. On September 22, near Sokółka they took part in the battle of Suchowola against the German 68th Infantry Division, and then in the battles of Krasnobród and Huta Różaniecka.

== Order of battle ==
- Headquarters
  - 12th Podolian Uhlan Regiment (12. pułk ułanów podolskich)
  - 19th Volhynian Uhlan Regiment (19. pułk ułanów wołyńskich im. gen. Edmunda Różyckiego)
  - 21st Vistula Uhlan Regiment (21. pułk ułanów nadwiślańskich)
  - 2nd Mounted Rifle Regiment (2. pułk strzelców konnych)
  - 11th Sea Rifle Battalion (11. batalion strzelców)
  - 2nd Gen. Józef Sowiński's Mounted Artillery Battalion (2. dywizjon artylerii konnej im. gen. Józefa Sowińskiego)
  - 21st Armoured Detachment (21. dywizjon pancerny)
  - 82nd Motorized AA Artillery Battery (82. bateria motorowa artylerii przeciwlotniczej)
  - 4th Bicycle Infantry Squadron (4. szwadron kolarzy)
  - 8th Engineers Squadron (8. szwadron pionierów)
  - 4th Communication Squadron (4. szwadron łączności)
  - 4th Heavy Machinegun Independent Platoon (4. samodzielny pluton ckm)
  - 4th Mounted Military Police Platoon (4. pluton konny żandarmerii)
- Supply columns
- 4th Battalion of 84th Infantry Regiment (IV batalion 84. pułku strzelców poleskich)
- 7th Heavy Machinegun Battalion (7. batalion ckm)

== See also ==
- Polish Army
- Invasion of Poland
- Polish army order of battle in 1939
- Kraków Cavalry Brigade
- Mazowiecka Cavalry Brigade
