= Battle of Wola Cyrusowa =

World War II battle

Coordinates: 51°53′00″N 19°46′00″E

- Part of Invasion of Poland
Date	8 September 1939
Location	Wola Cyrusowa, Łódź Voivodeship, Poland
Result	Polish victory

Belligerents
Germany	Poland

Commanders and leaders
(Nazi Germany) Johannes Blaskowitz (Nazi Germany) Friedrich Olbricht (Nazi Germany) Conrad von Cochenhausen	(Second Polish Republic) Wiktor Thommée

Strength
10th Infantry Division; 24th Infantry Division	2nd Legions Infantry Division; 28th Infantry Division; 30th Infantry Division; Wołyńska Cavalry Brigade; 21st Vistula Uhlan Regiment

Casualties and losses
Unknown	Unknown

The Battle of Wola Cyrusowa took place on 8 September 1939 near the village of Wola Cyrusowa near Stryków in Poland, during the September Campaign. It was fought between the forces of the Polish Piotrków Operational Group under Gen. Wiktor Thommée and the German 10th Infantry Division. In the effect of a successive delaying action, the Polish forces managed to regroup and withdraw eastwards while at the same time inflicting heavy losses on the opposing unit. However, their victory was only a temporary setback for the Nazi invasion of Poland.

== Prelude ==
Due to the strategic errors made by Gen. Juliusz Rómmel, the commander of the Łódź Army, the Polish units that were to form a defensive wedge against the German assault towards Warsaw were dislocated too close to the German border. Because of that, the Piotrków Operational Group, along with the rest of that army's units, entered contact with enemy forces already on September 1 and lost the chance to successfully support the Kraków Army and Poznań Army, defending the areas on both flanks. Also, the German superiority in mobile units meant that the Polish forces had it difficult to break off the enemy and regain strategic initiative.

The chaos in Polish ranks was enlarged by the fast pace of German advance and the fact that general Rómmel abandoned his army and left for Warsaw. The command was taken over by the commanding officer of the Piotrków Operational Group, general Wiktor Thommée.

== Opposing forces ==
To enable regroupment of the dispersed forces of the Łódź Army, Gen. Thommée ordered all the units to move to the forests in the area of the towns of Stryków and Głowno. The Polish forces included Wołyńska Cavalry Brigade (along with the remnants of the badly damaged 21st Vistula Uhlan Regiment), the 2nd Legions Infantry Division, as well as 28th and 30th Infantry Divisions.

The opposing force was composed of two infantry divisions of the German 8th Army under Johannes Blaskowitz. These were the 10th Infantry Division under Conrad von Cochenhausen and 24th Infantry Division under Friedrich Olbricht, as well as several smaller detachments of both 10th and 12th Corps.

== Battle ==
The first Polish units to reach the area, that is the Wołyńska Cavalry Bde and the 30th Infantry Division were ordered to secure the area in order to allow for the remaining units to join up with the core of the army. However, due to chaotic command during the first days of the war, all divisions were dispersed and most regiments acted separately. In the course of the withdrawal it turned out that the 36th Infantry Regiment of the 28th Division was separated from the main forces and had to break through German lines in order to catch up. The same issue applied to the 30th Infantry Regiment of the 10th Infantry Division, which formed a defensive line in the village of Boginia and did not receive the orders for withdrawal.

== See also ==
- List of World War II military equipment of Poland
- List of German military equipment of World War II
