= Battle of Mokra =

Battle in Poland in World War II

Coordinates: 50°58′00″N 18°55′00″E

- Part of Invasion of Poland
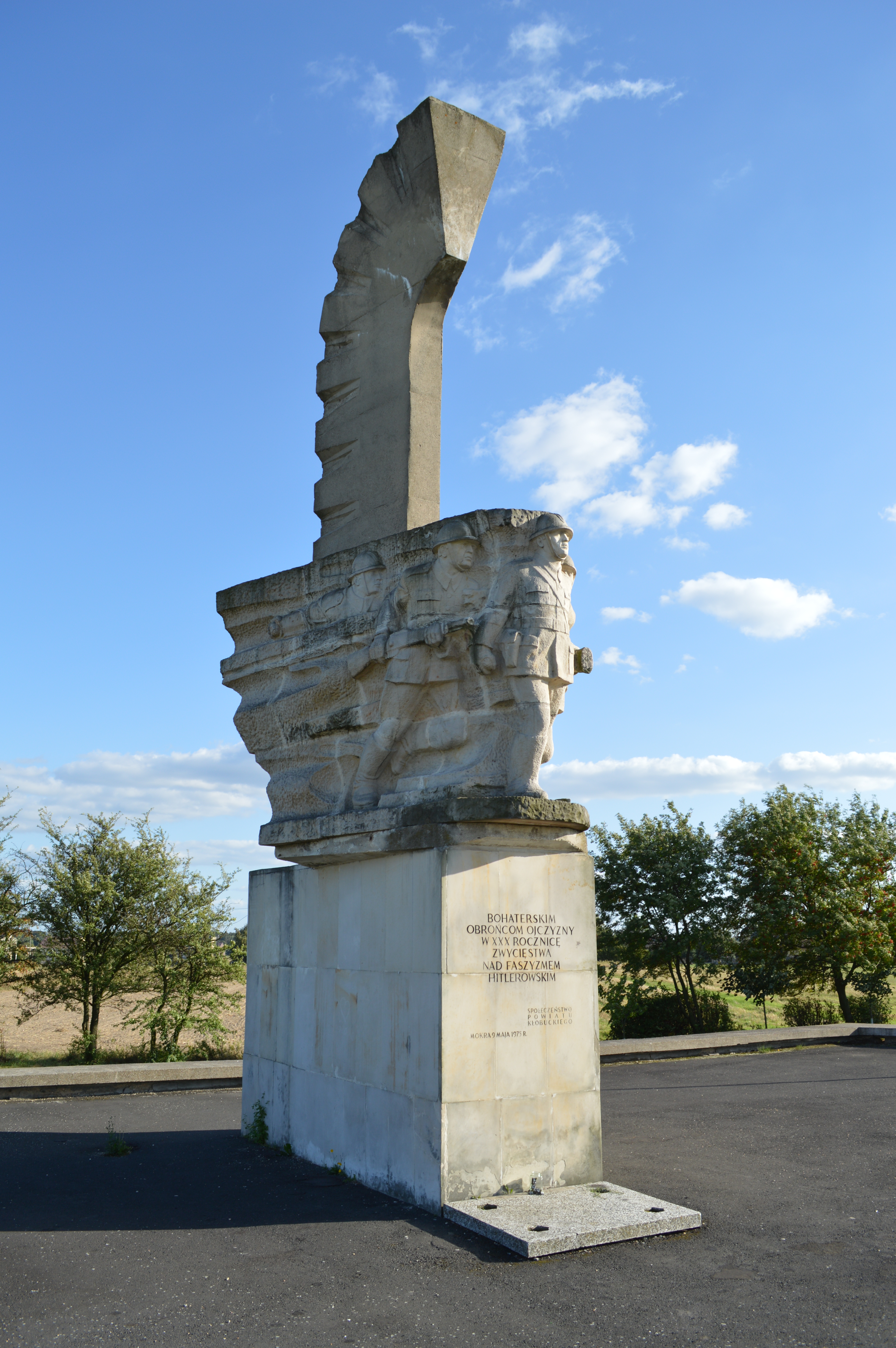
- Monument commemorating the battle
Date	1 September 1939
Location	Mokra, Kielce Voivodeship, Poland
Result	Polish victory

Belligerents
Germany	Poland

Commanders and leaders
(Nazi Germany) Georg-Hans Reinhardt (Nazi Germany) Friedrich Kirchner	(Second Polish Republic) Julian Filipowicz

Units involved
(Nazi Germany) XVI Panzer Corps: 4th Panzer Division; 1st Panzer Division; 31st Infantry Division; 18th Infantry Division	(Second Polish Republic) Army Łódź: Volhynian Cavalry Brigade; Śmiały (armoured train); (Second Polish Republic) Army Krakow: 7th Infantry Division

Casualties and losses
800 killed, missing, captured, or wounded 50 tanks 100–110 vehicles	500 killed, missing or wounded 300 horses several guns 1 tankette

The Battle of Mokra took place on 1 September 1939 near the village of Mokra, 5 km north of Kłobuck and 23 km north-west of Częstochowa, Poland. It was one of the first battles of the Invasion of Poland, during the Second World War, and was one of the few Polish victories of that campaign and the first German defeat of the conflict.

== Eve of the battle ==
According to the Polish mobilization scheme, the main task of the Łódź Army was to secure the connection between the Kraków Army operating in Silesia and Lesser Poland and the Poznań Army defending Greater Poland. It was also to cover the mobilization of a reserve Prusy Army behind the Polish lines. Because of that, the main purpose of the army was to gain time and offer delaying actions and harsh resistance in order for the mobilization to be accomplished.

The Wołyńska Cavalry Brigade was located north of the town of Kłobuck, along the railway to Katowice. Two regiments (19th Volhynian Uhlan Regiment and 21st Vistula Uhlan Regiment, as well as 4th battalion of the 84th Infantry Regiment) were entrenched on both ends of a forest surrounding the village of Mokra, to the west of the north-south rail road line. To the east, Colonel Julian Filipowicz placed the reserves of the brigade: 12th Podolian Uhlan Regiment, 2nd Mounted Rifles Regiment and 21st Armoured Battalion.

The main task of the Polish brigade was to keep the connection between the 7th Infantry Division (Poland) operating to the south and the 30th Infantry Division (Poland) to the north. The terrain chosen by the Polish commander was ideal for defence: a railroad earthwork and a forest formed the main defensive line while the foreground was hilly, with a large number of ditches, streams and other obstacles.

== Battle ==
On 1 September at 5:00 a.m., the German Tenth Army of Army Group South crossed the Polish border and initiated the invasion of Poland. The German 31st Infantry Division, as well as 1st and 4th Panzer Divisions crossed the border in the operational sector of the Polish Volhynian cavalry brigade. After breaking through small Border Guard and National Defence detachments, the German units seized the towns of Krzepice and Starokrzepice, directly in front of the main Polish positions. After capturing them, the Germans razed both towns and expelled all the local inhabitants towards the Polish lines.

The German units were divided into three separate assault groups. The 1st Panzer Division headed directly towards the town of Kłobuck, held by the Polish 7th Infantry Division, while the 4th Panzer Division was split into northern and southern columns, each trying to outflank the Polish positions around Mokra. At the same time, the Luftwaffe began a heavy bombardment of the Polish positions. By the end of the day, German aircraft made 15 attacks, with 9 to 26 bombers in each. The planes were mostly Junkers Ju 87 dive bombers.

At 6:30 a.m. the motorcycle reconnaissance squads of the 4th Panzer Division made contact with the 12th company of the 84th Infantry Regiment under Stanisław Radajewicz. Soon afterwards the AFVs arrived, supported by infantry and purportedly using Polish civilians as human shields. However, after several hits from Polish AT weapons on their flanks, the German tanks lost orientation, which allowed the civilians to cross the Polish lines with minor losses. The German assault was renewed shortly afterwards, but was repelled by heavy machine gun fire. Two AFVs retreated, while the majority of the motorcyclists were taken prisoner.

The 4th Panzer Division then mounted an assault on the Polish 21st Uhlans Regiment, further northwards. After a short artillery barrage and aerial bombardment, the German tanks took the village of Wilkowieck and headed directly for the village of Mokra. However, although the regiment lost many horses and approximately five ammunition cars, the bombs mostly missed the Polish defensive positions and the advancing tanks were met at 150 metres by well-positioned Polish-made 37mm Bofors antitank guns. After two Panzers were destroyed, the German tanks withdrew to 400 metres and started shelling the Poles with artillery, but after losing two additional AFVs (one destroyed and one immobilized), the German tanks retreated. The German infantry were left on a flat open field, right in front of the Polish positions, without any cover. They were forced to retreat by a Polish cavalry attack that caused heavy losses and resulted in a number of prisoners being taken by the Poles.

The positions of the 19th Uhlans Regiment were attacked at 8:00 a.m. by an assault group composed of tanks, AFVs, motorcyclists and infantry. The German group, divided into three columns, was advancing towards the village of Rębielice Szlacheckie in order to outflank the 21st Regiment from the north. However, the Germans were apparently unaware of the 19th Regiment's positions. The westernmost group easily captured the village, but the central group was caught in an ambush by the Poles near the forest and had to flee. The third group was advancing alongside the Polish positions in the forest, completely unaware of the Polish forces several hundred metres away. When the Polish machine guns and anti-tank guns opened fire, the group was almost annihilated before it could respond.

Nevertheless, the Polish northern flank was endangered and the Germans had uncovered its positions. To counter the threat, Col. Filipowicz ordered the 12th Uhlans Regiment under Andrzej Kuczek, until then held in reserve, to strengthen the positions of the 19th Regiment. The newly arrived units were fresh, yet already battle-hardened in the first skirmishes in the early morning, which helped Polish morale.

== German assault ==
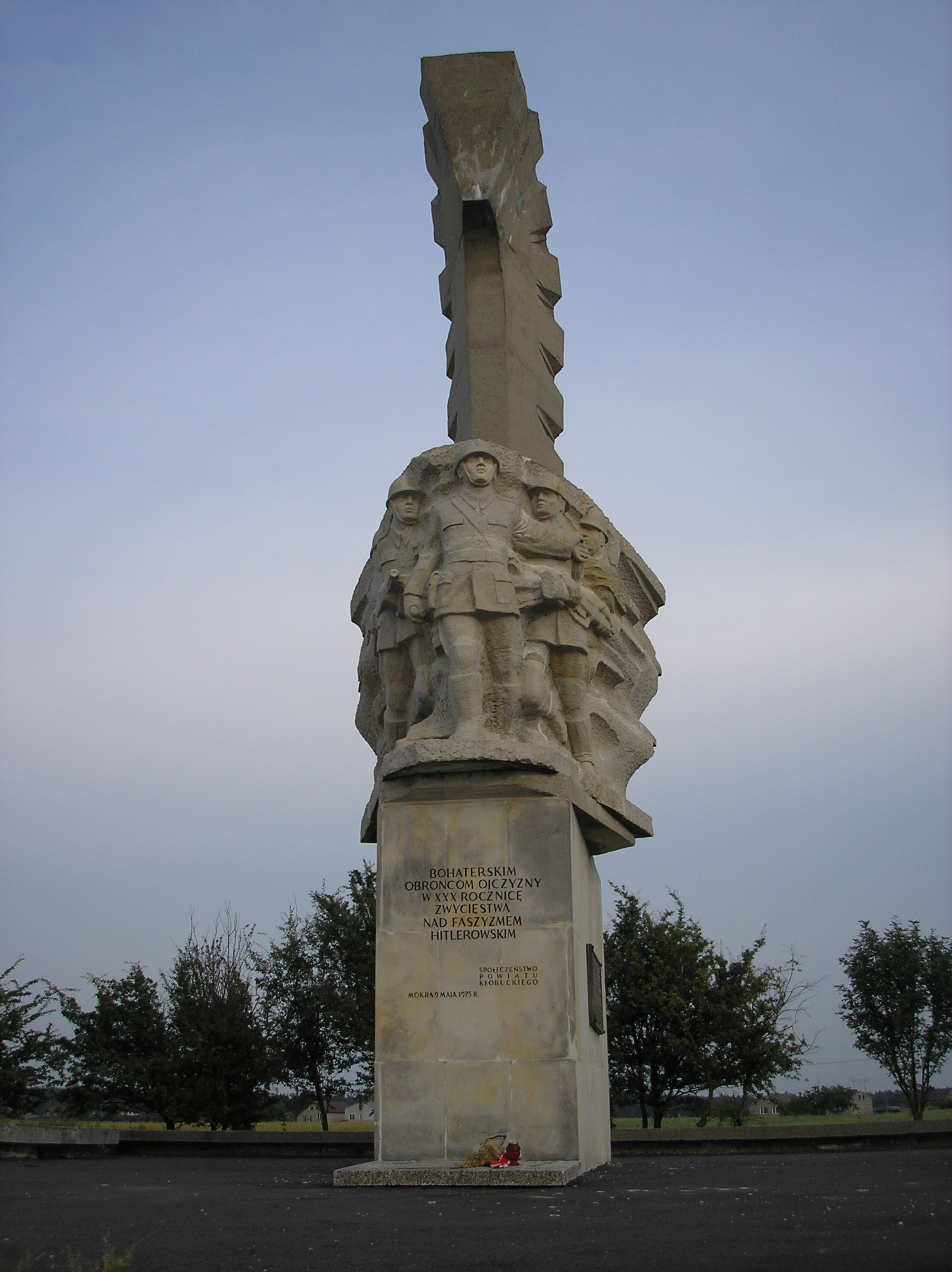
Monument to the Vohynian Cavalry Brigade in Mokra

At 10 a.m., the Wehrmacht started an assault on the northern flank, but were repelled from most positions with significant losses on both sides. Fifteen minutes later the German 4th Panzer Division repeated the attack, this time with artillery support and air cover. The assault was planned in three directions:

1. Towards the positions of the 19th Regiment and to the north, in order to outflank the brigade
2. Towards the village of Mokra itself, with approximately 100 tanks and AFVs
3. Towards the weakened 4th Battalion of the 84th Infantry Regiment

The northern assault was carried out quickly. Under heavy covering fire, the German tanks, a mixture of Panzer Is and Panzer IIs, managed to break into the forest and secured a road leading across the railway line to the village of Izbiska Duże, to the north of the Polish headquarters. At 10:30 a.m., the Polish 4th Squadron of the dismounted 19th Cavalry Regiment was attacked from behind and pushed out of the forest. This threatened the separation of their 19th and 21st Regiments. Colonel Filipowicz ordered the 19th Regiment to withdraw to the other side of the railway, but the way was already held by German tanks and the unit was effectively surrounded. However, the Polish defence was reinforced by the arrival of the Armoured train No. 53, known as Śmiały ("Bold"), which arrived on the battlefield just as the German tanks were crossing the railway line. It stopped in the middle of the German column and opened fire on the German tanks at close range with its two 75mm guns and heavy machine guns. The German column was dispersed and retreated with heavy losses, losing a number of Panzer I and II tanks, while the 19th Regiment crossed the railroad under cover of the armoured train. Although the 19th Regiment suffered heavy losses, it managed to regroup on the other side.

Simultaneously, a German attack on the main positions of the 21st Regiment near the village of Mokra began. German tanks managed to outflank the 4th Squadron of the Regiment from the north, at the same time attacking it frontally. The Polish defenders were pushed out of the forest and heavy fighting for the village itself started. The Germans lost four tanks to the Polish 2nd Artillery Battalion firing from across the railway, but the 4th Squadron was in retreat, fighting for almost every house in the village and suffering heavy losses. Armored train Śmiały arrived in the area at the height of the battle and opened fire from a distance of almost 2.5 km, which was beyond the effective range of most German tank guns of the time, in the end destroying or knocking out several more Panzer I and IIs. More Polish cavalry, made up of the 12th Uhlans Regiment, was moved to the area. The 12th Uhlans Regiment dismounted and reinforced the 21st Regiment.

== Polish counter-attack ==
The 21st Armoured Battalion under Maj. Stanisław Gliński, equipped mostly with Polish TKS tankettes was ordered to counter-attack the village, along with the cavalry squadron of Captain Jerzy Hollak. In the clouds of smoke of the burning village, the Polish units accidentally drove right into the middle of a German tank column. Although the Polish tankettes were no match for the heavier Panzer II German tanks and the cavalry was very vulnerable to tank fire, the confusion in German ranks prevented their commander from responding quickly enough. The Polish units managed to break through the German column with negligible losses and seized the forest to the northwest of Mokra. This manoeuvre is sometimes referred to as a Polish cavalry charge against German tanks, although no charge was planned nor executed. Nevertheless, the German tanks again lost orientation and the column withdrew from the village, again leaving it in Polish hands. The tanks withdrew to their initial positions in Wilkowiecko, leaving behind the infantry supporting the failed assault. German losses were high and a large number of German troops were taken prisoner.

At the same time, also at 10:00 a.m., the positions of the 4th Battalion of the 84th Infantry Regiment were attacked by a detachment of German mechanized infantry. After initial clashes the Polish 11th and 12th Companies withdrew deeper into the forest. Colonel Filipowicz ordered the 2nd Mounted Rifles to counter-attack and strengthen the positions between the 21st and 84th regiments. Also the 10th Company managed to charge the enemy and retake the positions lost only a couple of minutes earlier. By noon, the fighting in the centre and in the south of the Polish positions was over. The fighting in the forest on the northern flank was ended after the 19th Regiment successfully withdrew.

== Final struggles ==
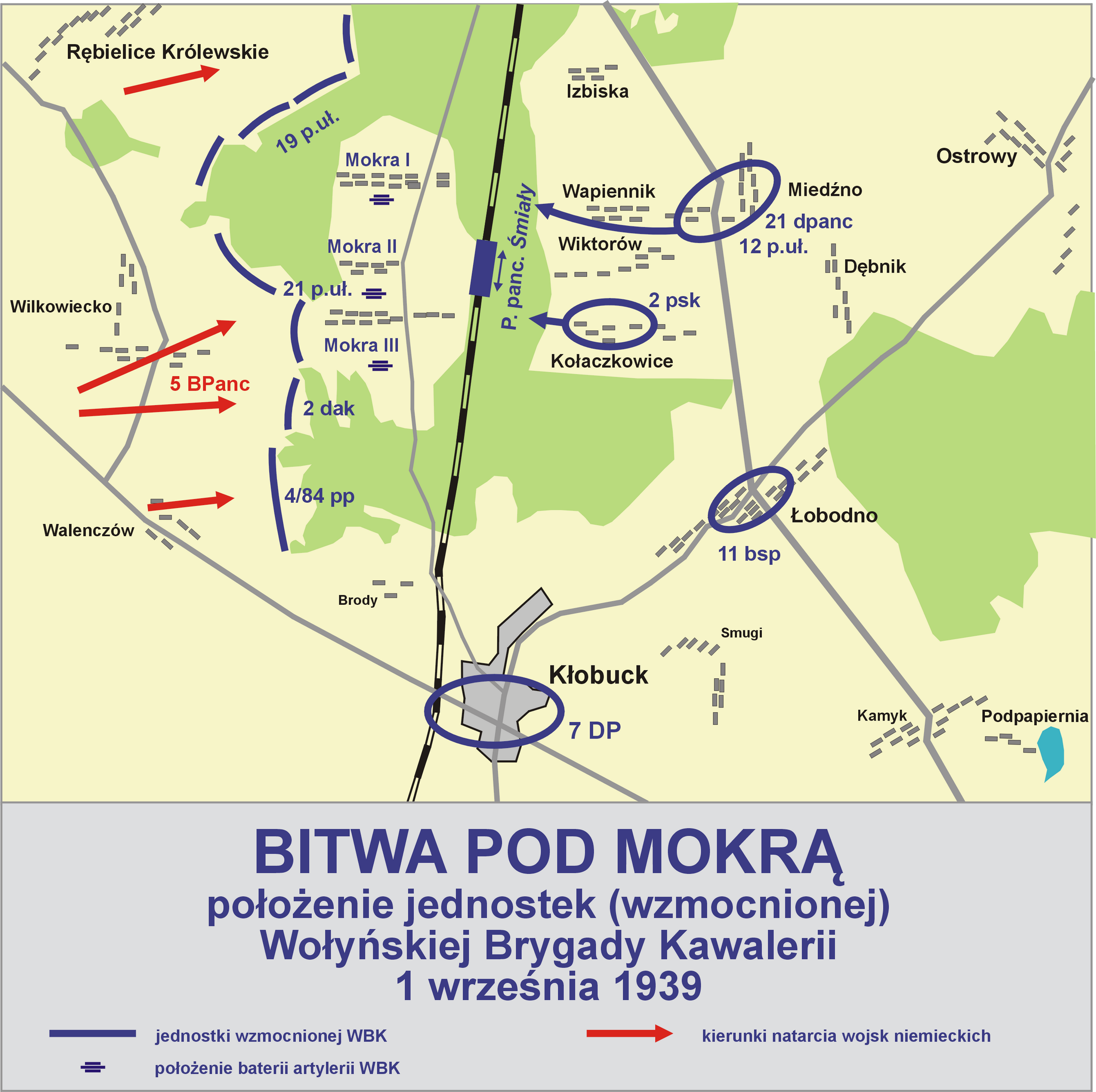
Polish map of the Battle of Mokra; In blue - position of the units of Volhynian Cavalry Brigade on 1 September 1939. Red - the German attack.

At 12:15 p.m. approximately 100 German tanks returned to the village of Mokra. The main assault broke the lines of the 4th squadron of the 21st Regiment and the tanks managed to charge the AT artillery nests, destroying two of the guns and breaking through to the central part of the village. The houses there were set on fire and the 21st Regiment managed to withdraw to the rail line, under cover of the smoke. Only isolated pockets of resistance were left in the village itself, which caused much confusion to the Germans.

The withdrawal of the 21st Regiment allowed the Germans to attack the 12th Regiment and the 2nd Artillery Battalion directly. The losses of the latter unit were high since most of the 75 mm field guns were not the best weapon for antitank fire. The 2nd battery lost all three guns and the HMG, while the 3rd battery lost two guns. However, the rest of the artillery positions were covered with smoke from the burning houses the Germans had set afire, and were successfully hidden. When a group of tanks unknowingly approached the 1st battery, the Polish guns used direct fire on the German tanks, destroying thirteen of them within a few minutes. This allowed the Poles to hold their positions. The 12th Regiment under Andrzej Kuczek attacked the German tanks from the rear, from the previously-retaken forest to the northwest of the village. Although both sides suffered heavy losses, the Germans withdrew. After the assault ended, the 2nd Artillery Battalion was withdrawn from the battle due to heavy losses and lack of ammunition.

At 3:00 p.m., the Germans repeated the frontal assault with heavy artillery fire, tactical air attacks and almost 180 tanks from Wilkowiecko. Simultaneously, side attacks were commenced on the Polish flanks. The frontal assault was directed on the 2nd Squadron of the 12th Regiment (commanded by Stanisław Raczkowski), in the centre of the village. Although the Polish artillery destroyed many of them, the German tanks managed to break through again to the village. The 4th squadron under Feliks Pruszyński counter-attacked, but both squadrons were being constantly pressed towards the rail line. Colonel Filipowicz had no further reserves and the German tanks were nearing the railway crossing, while the Polish cavalry was being pushed back with heavy losses. Soon the regiments lost contact with each other. Because of the smoke, the battle broke down to a series of different skirmishes in the forests, the village and along the rails. All batteries but one of the 2nd Battalion were withdrawn from the battle. This made the situation of the 12th Regiment critical.

The 2nd Mounted Rifle Regiment, the only unit that was still intact and in contact with the commander of the brigade, was ordered to assault at all costs and reinforce the 12th Regiment and the gap between the cavalry and the 4th battalion of the 84th Regiment in the south. This helped the Polish defence, but only for the moment. Colonel Filipowicz ordered the Polish tankettes to charge the German tanks in the village. Although the tankettes were not supplied with antitank ammunition, in the chaos of the battle they managed to halt the German advance temporarily. After losing one tankette the Poles withdrew, but managed to gain enough time for the armoured trains to return to the area. To the north, at the positions of the 19th Regiment the tanks also managed to break through and started crossing the railroad near Izbiska. When the German tanks crossed the line, both of the armoured trains arrived and attacked them from behind. While the losses in tanks were limited, the panic that started in German units resulted in many tanks being abandoned by their crews, who could not drive the tanks directly through the railway tracks, which were elevated some two metres above the ground; the crossing was blocked by burning AFVs. Although both trains suffered some losses and were finally forced to retreat, the panic in German ranks was not stopped. In the smoke some of the German tanks started firing at German positions, while others simply retreated towards their initial position, directly through the German infantry.

In the south the Polish infantry was yet again pushed deeper into the forest, but its lines were not broken. By 5:00 p.m. the battle was over.

== Aftermath ==
The German 4th Panzer Division was forced back to its initial positions in Opatów and Wilkowiecko, and only the 12th Schützen Regiment managed to reach the rail road crossing at Izbiska. However, upon learning that the German 1st Panzer Division had managed to take Kłobuck, the Polish forces were withdrawn overnight south-eastwards, to the village of Łobodno located north-east of Kłobuck, and then to the second line of defence, some 12 km to the east.

== Casualties ==
The losses on both sides were quite high. The Germans lost approximately 800 men (killed, captured, wounded or missing), and between 100 and 160 AFVs (at least 50 of them tanks). The Polish brigade lost 200 killed and 300 wounded, as well as 300 horses and several guns. The 2nd Mounted Artillery Battalion lost almost 30% of its men, the 21st Regiment almost 25%; the 12th Uhlans Regiment that was used as a reserve lost 5 officers and 216 men killed and wounded.

== See also ==
- Polish cavalry
- Leonard Żłób
- List of World War II military equipment of Poland
- List of German military equipment of World War II
