= Żurawiejka =

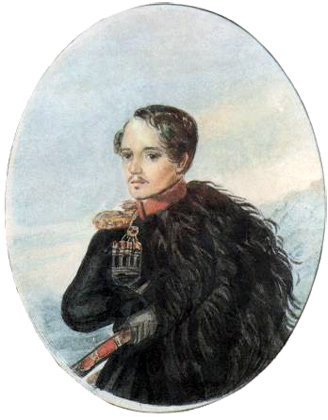
Mikhail Lermontov, the father of żurawiejka.

Żurawiejka was a short, two-line facetious couplet, written specifically for cavalry regiments of the Polish Army in the interwar period. It humorously and ironically presented the history of a given regiment, as well as its contemporary fate. Żurawiejkas were also used in cavalry regiments of the Imperial Russian Army, as the tradition of writing them, as well as the very name of the couplet, comes from Russian cavalry, and was taken over by the Poles in the interbellum period. Famous Russian poet Mikhail Lermontov is considered the father of żurawiejka, as he wrote first couplets while serving as a junker in the Russian Army. Żurawiejkas were sung by Polish cavalrymen at several occasions, mostly during different parties, and were usually associated with dancing. Common topics in most of them are the Polish–Soviet War, drinking, looting, and women. They described a military unit in black humor, using derogatory terms and swear words.

== Żurawiejka in the Polish Army ==
Following the Polish–Soviet War, the couplets quickly gained popularity among cavalry regiments of the Polish Army. Some historians trace back Polish żurawiejkas to the "Uhlan March", written in 1863, during the January Uprising. Furthermore, during World War I, soldiers of the Polish Legions sang the "Song of Wasowicz's Squadron", which described a cavalry charge during the Charge of Rokitna (13 June 1915), led by rotmistrz Zbigniew Dunin-Wasowicz.

"Nasz Wąsowicz, chłop morowy, Zbił Moskali w Cucyłowej.

Odznaczył się szwadron drugi, Wrażej krwi on przelał strugi."

English translation:

"Our Wąsowicz, a great guy, Beat up the Moskals in Cucylowa.

Second squadron distinguished itself, By shedding streams of enemy blood"

Originally, every uhlan regiment of the Polish Army had its żurawiejka. Later on, the tradition was adopted by regiments of mounted rifles - even though, as one couplet said: "To tell the truth among ourselves - riflemen are not uhlans" ("Prawdę mówiąc między nami – strzelcy nie są ułanami"). Furthermore, there were żurawiejkas of units of infantry, artillery, armored troops, navy and airforce.

== Examples of żurawiejkas of the interbellum Polish Army ==
=== 2nd Grochow Uhlan Regiment, stationed in Suwałki ===
"Przy kieliszku koić troski, Zwykł ułanów pułk grochowski.

Lampas z gaci, płaszcz z gałganów To jest drugi pułk ułanów.

Pomną sotnie Budionnego Pułk ułanów Dwernickiego"

English translation:

"Uhlan Regiment of Grochow, Tends to its problems with a shot-glass.

Lampasse made of trousers, coat made of rags, This is the 2nd Uhlan Regiment.

Sotnias of Budyonny, Will remember the Regiment of Dwernicki Uhlans".

- Józef Dwernicki was a general of Polish Cavalry in the November Uprising.

=== 10th Lithuanian Uhlan Regiment, stationed in Białystok ===
"Z Litwy borów, pól i łanów, to dziesiąty pułk ułanów.

A rozkazów kto nie słucha, to dziesiąty pułk Obucha.

Jedzie ułan z dziesiątego, wyją psy na widok jego.

W Dniepru wodach konie poi, pułk dziesiąty – pomni moi.

O dziesiątym nic nie wiemy, Więc go chwalić nie będziemy".

English translation:

"From Lithuania's forests, fields and cornfields, This is the 10th Uhlan Regiment.

And who does not obey orders, This is the 10th Regiment of Obuch.

An uhlan of the 10th is riding, Dogs are howling upon seeing him.

Their horses are drinking water from the Dniepr, 10th Regiment - remember.

We do not know anything about the 10th, So we will not praise it".

- Wladyslaw Obuch-Woszczatyński was first commandant of the Regiment

=== 15th Poznań Uhlan Regiment, stationed in Poznań ===
"A kto wroga krwią zbroczony? To piętnasty pułk czerwony.

Skąd piętnasty jest czerwony? Bolszewików krwią zbroczony.

Ostróg brzęk w Poznaniu dzwoni, To z piętnastki są czerwoni.

Lepiej zginąć na dnie sracza, Niźli służyć u Kiedacza.

Wciąż gotowi do kochania, To ułani są z Poznania".

English translation:

"And who is covered in enemy's blood? It's the 15th red Regiment.

Why is the 15th red? It's covered in Bolshevik blood.

Spurs are heard ringing in Poznan, These are the reds of the 15th.

It's better to die on the bottom of a shithouse, Than to serve with Kiedacz.

Still ready to love, These are uhlans from Poznan".

- Zbigniew Kiedacz was one of regiment's commanders

=== 18th Pomeranian Uhlan Regiment, stationed in Grudziądz ===
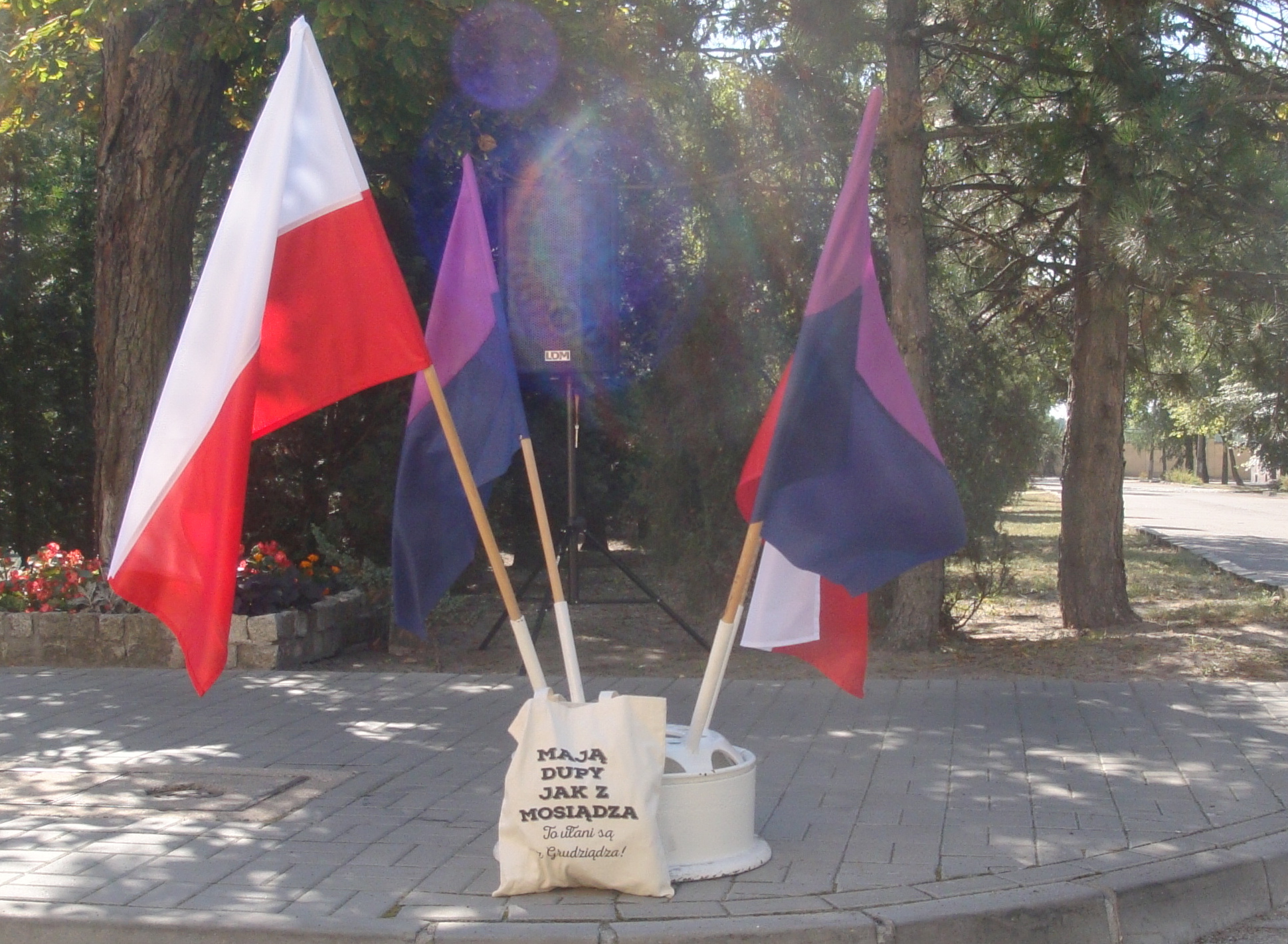
Part of żurawiejka of 18th Pomeranian Uhlan Regiment on shopping bag

"Pełen manier ładnych dworskich, Osiemnasty pułk pomorski.

Wiać przez morze na Pomorze, Osiemnasty zawsze może.

Mają dupy jak z mosiądza, To ułani są z Grudziądza.

Osiemnasty spod Libawy, Przywiózł panny dla zabawy.

Czy śnieg pada, czy deszcz leje, Osiemnasty zawsze wieje".

English translation:

"Full of courteous manners, This is the 18th Pomeranian Regiment.

To run away through the sea to Pomerania, The 18th can always do that.

Their asses are made of brass, These are the uhlans from Grudziadz.

The 18th brought from Liepāja, Ladies to have fun with.

Whether it snows, whether it rains, The 18th always runs away".

- During the Polish-Soviet War, 18th Regiment, encircled by the Soviets, crossed Latvian border, and returned to Poland via Baltic Sea, from Liepāja to Gdańsk.

=== 19th Volhynian Uhlan Regiment, stationed in Ostróg ===
"Dziewiętnasty to hołota, Bo na konie siada z płota.

Gwałci panny, gwałci wdowy Dziewiętnasty pułk morowy".

English translation:

"The 19th is a rabble, Because its soldiers mount their horses from a fence.

It rapes girls, it rapes widows, The 19th, a groovy regiment".

== Chorus ==
All żurawiejkas had a chorus, repeated after each couplet. It went on as follows:

"Lance do boju, szable w dłoń Bolszewika goń, goń, goń

Żuraw, żuraw, żurawia Żurawiejka ty maja!"

English translation:

"Lances for the battle, sabres in hand, Chase the Bolshevik, chase, chase.

Crane, crane, crane You are my żurawiejka".
