= Julian Filipowicz =

Polish military officer (1895–1945)

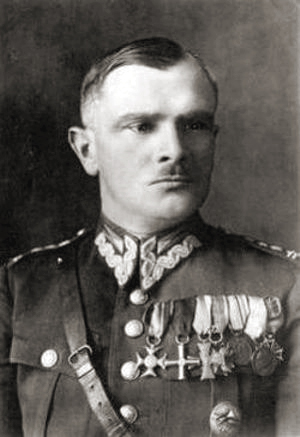
- Born: 13 September 1895; Lemberg, Galicia, Austria-Hungary
- Died: 14 August 1945 (aged 49); Otwock, Masovia, Poland
- Military career
- Allegiance: Austria-Hungary; Poland; Polish Underground State
- Branch: Polish Legions; Austro-Hungarian Army; Polish Armed Forces; Home Army
- Service years: 1914–1945
- Rank: Major General
- Commands: 7th Lublin Uhlan Regiment; 3rd Regiment of Horse Rifles "Crown Hetman Stefan Czarniecki"; Wołyńska Cavalry Brigade
- Conflicts: World War I Polish–Ukrainian War; Polish Soviet War; World War II: Battle of Mokra

Julian Filipowicz (13 September 1895 – 14 August 1945) was a major general of the Polish Armed Forces and a commander of the Home Army in the Kraków-Silesia Area. He was also a commander of the Service for Poland's Victory in the Kraków area and inspector of the main headquarters of the Union of Armed Struggle and Home Army.

== Biography ==
Filipowicz was born on 13 September 1895 in Lemberg, in the family of Antoni and Justyna Derpowska. He was the brother of Paweł Piotr and Tadeusz Justyn, lieutenant colonels of artillery; in 1940 both would be victims of the Katyn massacre.

In 1913, he graduated from a real school in Lemberg, then a student of the local polytechnic.

After the outbreak of World War I, he joined the Polish Legions from August 1914 to July 1917, where he fought in the 1st Uhlans Regiment. From 5 February to 31 March 1917 he was a student of the cavalry officer course at the 1st Uhlans' regiment in Ostrołęka. He completed the course with a very good result. At that time, he had the rank of chief chief's. On 23 July 1917, after the Oath crisis, he became a member of the Polish Auxiliary Corps in Galicia.

In September of the same year, he was arrested on suspicion of agitation and spent two months in a prison in Przemyśl. After his release, he was drafted into the 8th Uhlans of the Austrian Army, stationed in Transylvania. In June 1918 he was granted leave, then deserted and joined the Polish Military Organization in the Lublin region.

During his stay in Lemberg in November 1918, he joined the unit of Captain Mieczysław Boruta-Spiechowicz as soon as the Polish–Ukrainian War broke out. On 15 November, he was promoted to the rank of second lieutenant. From December 1918 to May 1919, he served in the intelligence service of the 4th field artillery regiment on the Ukrainian front. In June, he was transferred to the 11th Legions Uhlan Regiment as a squadron commander in the Polish–Soviet War. Already in October, he was sent to the Officers' School of Driving, after graduating in April 1920, he became an instructor and liaison at the Ukrainian 6th Division. In July of the same year, he was promoted to the rank of lieutenant. In August, he returned to his home 11th Uhlans as a squadron commander.

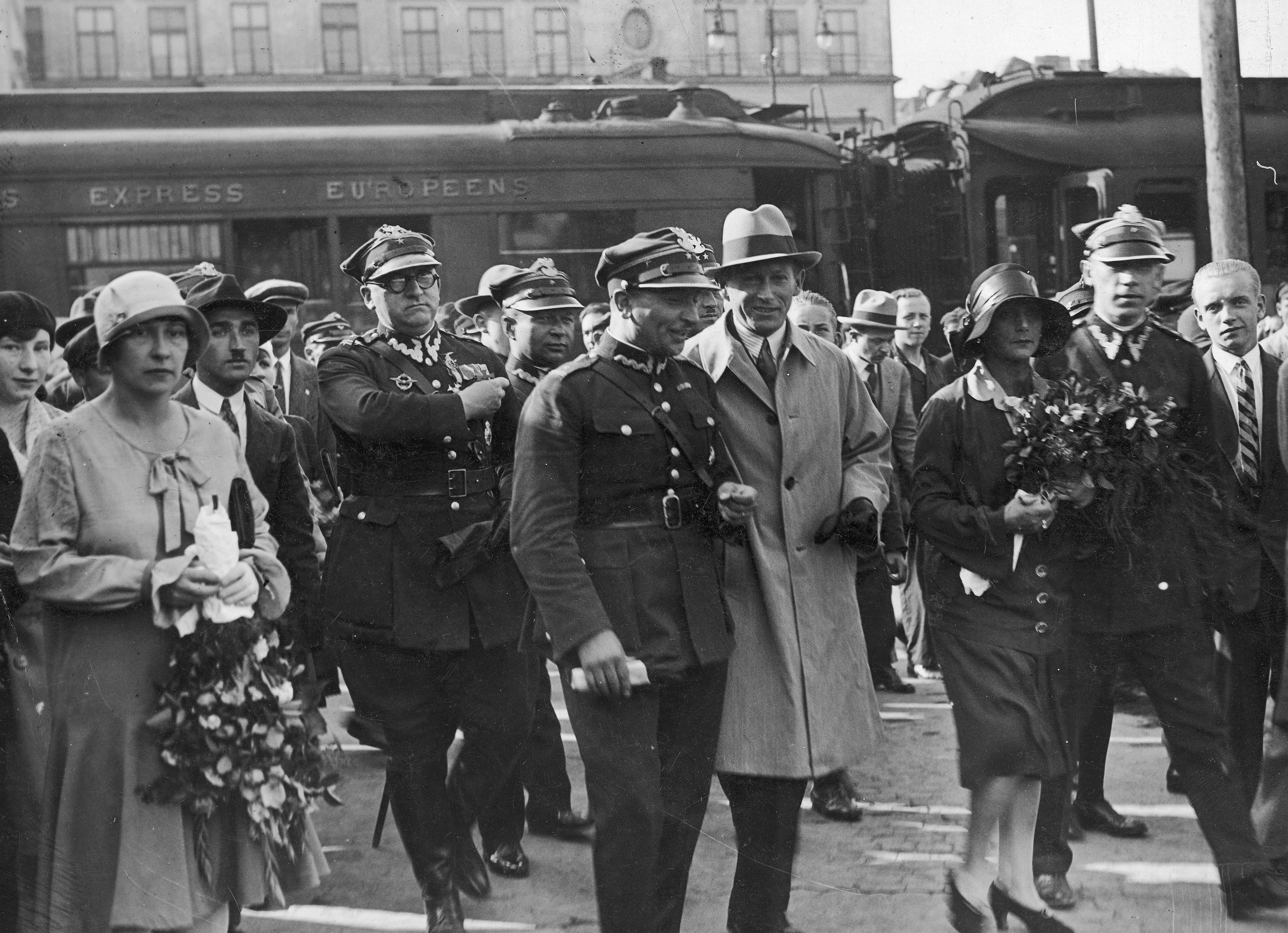
Major Kazimierz Kubala (in the foreground, in a light coat) accompanied by, among others: Major Bogdan Kwiecinski (wearing glasses), Lieutenant Colonel Julian Filipowicz (to the left of Major Kubala), Deputy Head of the Aeronautics Department Major Władysław Kubala (1st of right in the foreground, in a uniform) with his wife (in a dark hat, with flowers) on the train station platform. (1929)

After the end of the war, he remained in the 11th Regiment as a squadron commander. From 15 August 1924, after being promoted to the rank of major, he was the commander of the NCO school in his regiment. During the May Coup, he sent the regiment to Warsaw in emergency mode, where he supported Piłsudski's units. On 23 May 1927, he was appointed deputy regiment commander. In the years 1928–1930 he was a student of the Wyższa Szkoła Wojenna in Warsaw. On 1 November 1930, after completing the course and obtaining a certified officer diploma, he was appointed commander of the 7th Lublin Uhlan Regiment in Mińsk Mazowiecki. On 4 July 1935, he took command of the 3rd regiment of mounted rifles in Wołkowysk.

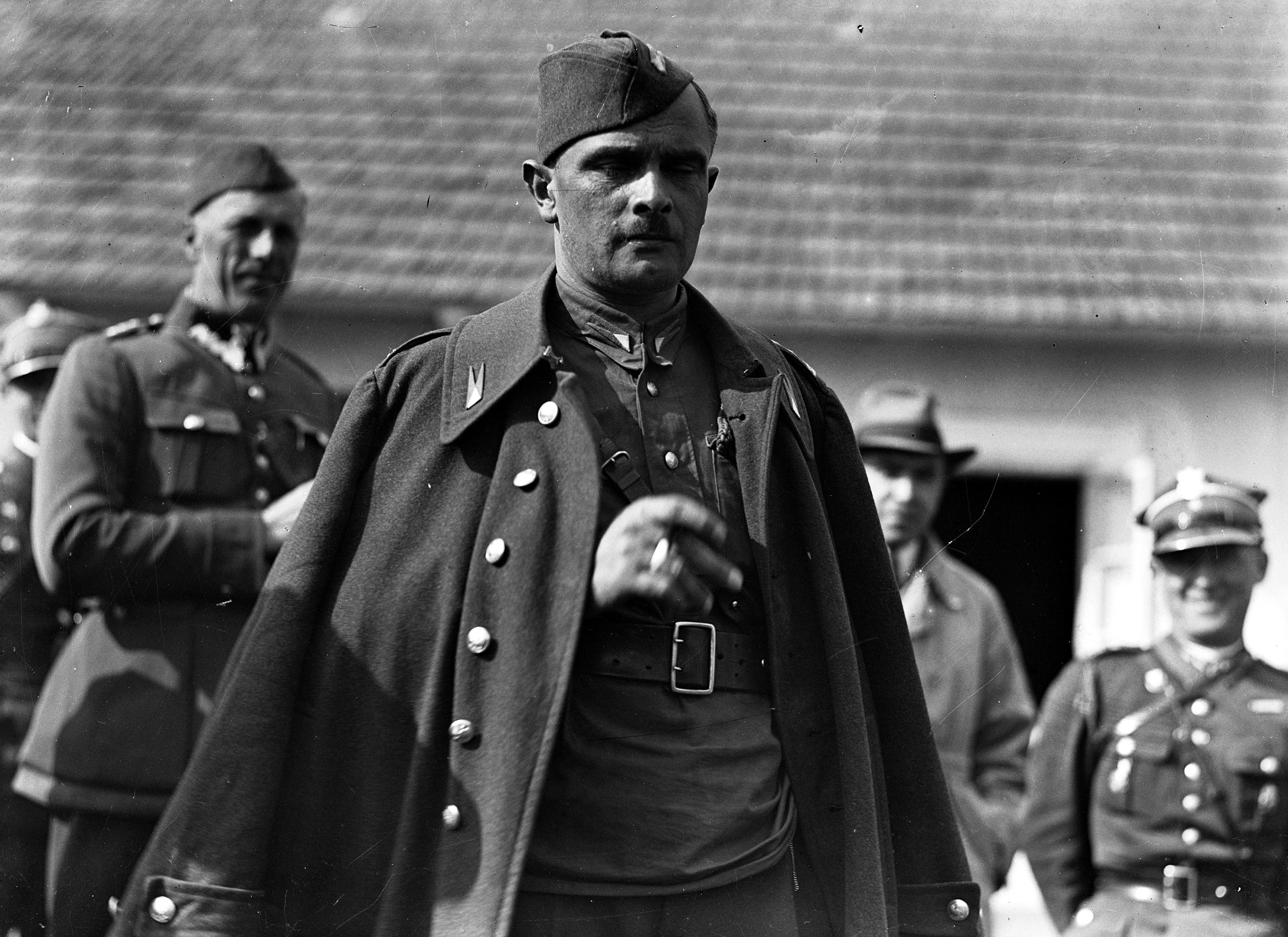
A group of lancers from the 7th Regiment of Lublin Lancers in front of the manor where they are quartered. In the foreground, Colonel Julian Filipowicz. (1933)

In June 1939, he was entrusted with the command of the Wołyńska Cavalry Brigade in Równe. He led the brigade during the September Campaign, passing the combat route from Mokra through Warsaw to the Battle of Tomaszów Lubelski.

On 23 September 1939, he disbanded the remnants of his unit and, in civilian clothes, made his way to Warsaw, where he joined the Polish Underground State in underground activities of the Service for Poland's Victory. At the beginning of 1940, he was arrested by the Gestapo and imprisoned in the Pawiak prison, from which he escaped on 10 May 1940, hidden in a garbage truck.

After his escape and convalescence, he became the head of the Kraków District, which he commanded until March 1941 when he was re-arrested and imprisoned at Montelupich Prison, where he was tortured during interrogations. As he was tortured and unconscious, he was mistakenly pronounced dead and taken to the morgue, from which he escaped after regaining consciousness. He contracted tuberculosis while in prison and while escaping, evacuated to Otwock where he was placed in a private guesthouse near a pulmonary sanatorium. Due to his inability to return to Kraków, he was appointed commander of the Białystok AK district. Due to serious illness, he did not manage to take up a new position; he was put on leave and transferred to the personnel reserve. On 15 August 1942, he was promoted to the rank of brigadier general at the request of the Commander-in-Chief of the Home Army.

Before the Warsaw Uprising, he was appointed to the headquarters of the Home Army Headquarters, but he did not come because the Red Army entered. Due to the diseases he acquired, he developed lung cancer. He died on 14 August 1945 in Otwock as a result of a tumor-induced hemorrhage and was buried at the local parish cemetery (sector V-15-353c). At the request of the Minister of National Defense, President of the Republic of Poland Andrzej Duda, by a decision of 11 July 2019, appointed him posthumously to the rank of Major General.

== Awards ==
- Virtuti Militari, Gold Cross
- Virtuti Militari, Silver Cross
- Cross of Independence (12 May 1931)
- Order of Polonia Restituta, Officer's Cross (11 November 1937)
- Order of Polonia Restituta, Knight's Cross
- Cross of Valour
- Cross of Merit
- Commemorative Medal for the War of 1918–1921
- Medal of the Decade of Regained Independence

== Bibliography ==
- Officer's Yearbook 1923. Warsaw: Ministry of Military Affairs. 1923.
- Officer's Yearbook 1924. Warsaw: Ministry of Military Affairs. 1924.
- Officer's Yearbook 1928. Warsaw: Ministry of Military Affairs. 1928.
- Rocznik Oficerski 1932. Warsaw: Ministry of Military Affairs. 1932.
- Cezary Leżeński / Lesław Kukawski (1991). About the Polish cavalry of the 20th century. Wrocław: Zakład Narodowy im. Ossoliński. p. 117. ISBN 83-04-03364-X.
- Bielski, Mieczysław (1991). Operational Group "Piotrków" 1939. Warsaw: Bellona Publishing House. p. 381. ISBN 83-11-07836-X.
- Jurga, Tadeusz (1990). Defense of Poland 1939. Warsaw: PAX Publishing Institute. p. 766. ISBN 83-211-1096-7.
- Kryska-Karski, Tadeusz; Żurakowski, Stanisław (1991). Generals of independent Poland. Warsaw: Editions Spotkania.
- Kazimierz Józef Skrzesiński: Volyn Cavalry Brigade – Iron Brigade , KJS 2012, publ. I, pp. 343–354. ISBN 978-83-932030-1-7.
