= Wola Cyrusowa =

- Village
- Location within Poland
- Coordinates: 51°53′N 19°46′E
- Country: Poland
- Voivodeship: Łódź
- County: Brzeziny
- Gmina: Dmosin

Wola Cyrusowa [ˈvɔla t͡sɨruˈsɔva] is a village in the administrative district of Gmina Dmosin, within Brzeziny County, Łódź Voivodeship, in central Poland.
