= Mokra, Silesian Voivodeship =

Mokra
- Village
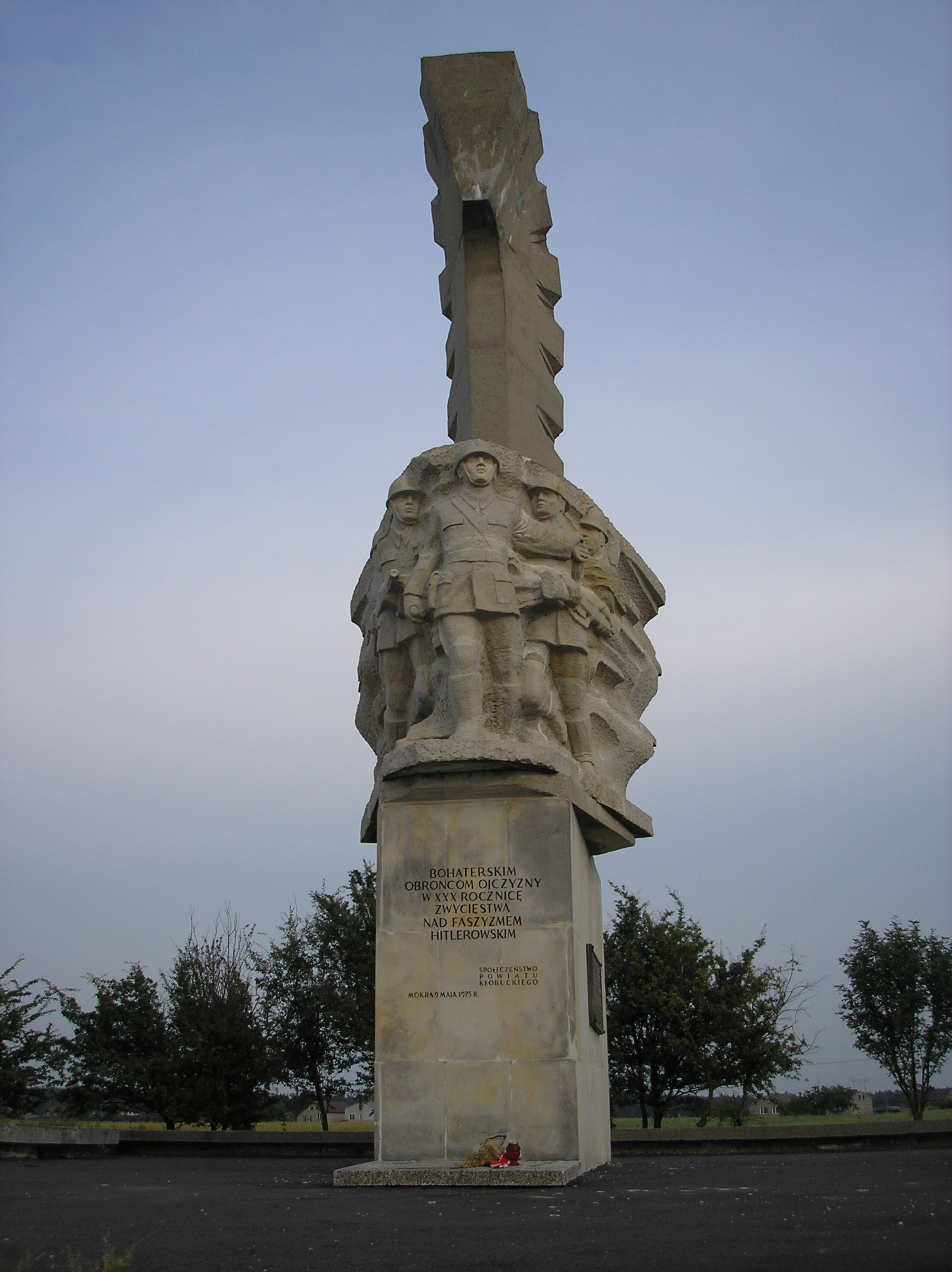
- Monument to the Volhynian Cavalry Brigade in Mokra

- Location within Poland
- Coordinates: 50°58′N 18°55′E
- Country: Poland
- Voivodeship: Silesian
- County: Kłobuck
- Gmina: Miedźno
- Population: 796

Mokra [ˈmɔkra] is a village in the administrative district of Gmina Miedźno, within Kłobuck County, Silesian Voivodeship, in southern Poland.

On 1 September 1939, it was the site of the Battle of Mokra, fought between the Polish cavalry brigade and a German panzer division. The one-day battle was won by the Poles.
