= Rokytne, Chernivtsi Oblast =

Commune in Chernivtsi Oblast, Ukraine

Coordinates: 48.3300°N 26.1900°E

Rokytne (Ukrainian: Рокитне; Romanian: Răchitna) is a village in Chernivtsi Raion, Chernivtsi Oblast, Ukraine. It is part of Novoselytsia urban hromada, one of the hromadas of Ukraine.

Until 18 July 2020, Rokytne was part of Novoselytsia Raion. As part of the administrative reform of Ukraine, the raion was abolished in July 2020, reducing the number of raions of Chernivtsi Oblast to three. The area of Novoselytsia Raion was divided between Chernivtsi and Dniester Raions, with Rokytne being transferred to Chernivtsi Raion. According to the 2001 census, 96.72% of the inhabitants spoke Romanian as their native language, while 3.04% spoke Ukrainian.

== See also ==
- Charge of Rokitna
