= Battle of Wilno (1939) =

Battle of the Soviet invasion of Poland in WWII

- Part of the Soviet invasion of Poland in the European theatre of World War II
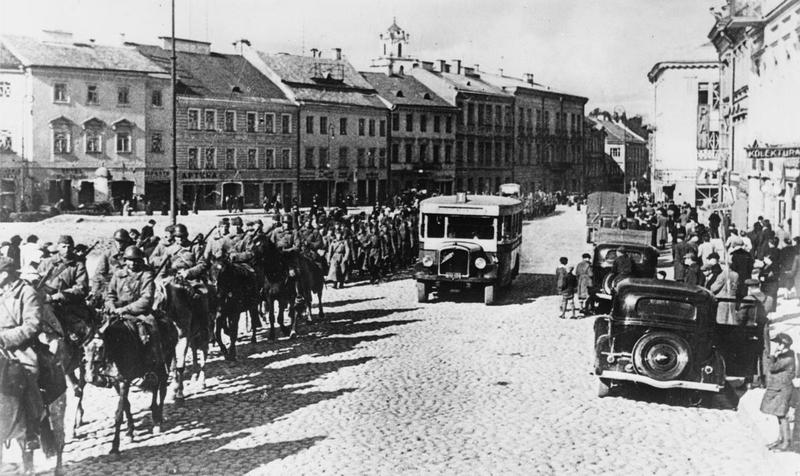
- Soviet troops entering Wilno, 1939
Date	18–19 September 1939
Location	Wilno, Wilno Voivodeship, Second Polish Republic 54°40′N 25°19′E
Result	Soviet victory
Territorial changes	Wilno is transferred to the Republic of Lithuania

Belligerents
Soviet Union	Poland

Commanders and leaders
(Soviet Union) Mikhail Kovalyov (Soviet Union) Pyotr Akhlyustin (Soviet Union) Semyon Zybin	Jarosław Okulicz-Kozaryn

Strength
Two cavalry divisions three armoured brigades	10 infantry battalions (6,500 men); 18-22 guns (including AA guns); ~40 MGs

Casualties and losses
Soviet counts: 13 killed 24 wounded five BT tanks destroyed one BA-10 armoured car destroyed three other AFVs damaged	

The Battle of Wilno (modern Vilnius, Lithuania) was fought by the Polish Army against the Soviet invasion of Poland in 1939, which accompanied the German Invasion of Poland in accordance with Molotov–Ribbentrop Pact. On 18–19 September, Soviet forces took over the city of Wilno. Polish forces, concentrated in the west, were relatively weak in the east. The Polish commanders, unsure whether to actively oppose the Soviet entry into Poland, did not use the full defensive capabilities of the town and nearby fortifications, although the outcome of the battle would not have been likely any different, given the overwhelming Soviet numerical superiority.

== Prelude ==
The city of Wilno was the capital of the Wilno Voivodeship and the sixth-largest city in the Second Polish Republic, in addition to being and an important industrial centre in the north-east of that country. Administratively, it was part of the Grodno-based III Military Corps Area and under Józef Olszyna-Wilczyński, it was also an important garrison and mobilization centre. In the Interwar period, the city housed the entire 1st Legions Infantry Division, as well as the headquarters and the 4th Niemen Uhlan Regiment of the Wileńska Cavalry Brigade. Air cover was provided by the majority of the Polish 5th Aviation Regiment stationed at the nearby airfield of Porubanek (modern Vilnius Airport). In addition, the city was a mobilization centre for the 35th Infantry Division.

Before the outbreak of war, the 1st Legions Infantry Division had been secretly mobilized and sent towards Różan in northern Mazovia. The Wileńska Cavalry Brigade soon followed and in the first days of September 1939 left the city for Piotrków Trybunalski. The air assets were attached to the Modlin Army and the Narew Group fighting against the German units trying to break through from East Prussia. By 7 September the 35th Division was fully mobilized and transported to Lwów (modern Lviv, Ukraine); the city was left defenceless.

The military commander of the city, Colonel Jarosław Okulicz-Kozaryn, decided that in case of attack by German or Soviet forces, he had insufficient forces for a successful defence and thus his task could only be to allow civilians to evacuate to neutral Lithuania (this was also realised, albeit not very clearly, by General Józef Olszyna-Wilczyński, commander of the III Military Corps Area which the city was also in).

On 17 September, Wilno had 14,000 soldiers and militia volunteers, of which only 6,500 were armed. Before the battle, the numbers of armed soldiers rose slightly as some disorganized units trickled in, but the number of unarmed volunteers decreased, as Okulicz-Kozaryn ordered unarmed volunteers not to participate in any hostilities. Before Soviet arrival, the Polish forces formed about 10 infantry battalions, supported by approximately 15 light artillery and anti-tank guns and about five anti-aircraft guns. The defenders also had some 40 machine guns.

On 18 September, the commander of the Belorussian Front, Komandarm (roughly a general), Mikhail Kovalyov, ordered that the city be captured by the 3rd and 11th Armies. The 3rd Army delegated the 24th Cavalry Division and the 22nd and 25th Armoured Brigades under Kombrig (senior to colonel but junior to divisional commander), Pyotr Akhlyustin, to advance from the northeast and the 11th Army delegated the 36th Cavalry Division and the 6th Armoured Brigade under Kombrig Semyon Zybin to advance from the southeast. Their task was to secure the city by the evening of 18 September; but due to logistical difficulties and the overestimation of the Polish defences, the operation was revised with the aim of securing the city by the morning of 19 September.

== Battle ==
Soviet Army, Belorussian Front
3rd Army	24th Cavalry Division
3rd Army	22nd Tank Brigade
3rd Army	25th Tank Brigade
11th Army	7th Cavalry Division
11th Army	36th Cavalry Division
11th Army	6th Tank Brigade

On 18 September, at around 17:00, Okulicz-Kozaryn received reports of Soviet forces approaching from Oszmiana (today, Ashmyany). They consisted of armoured scouts which had engaged Polish infantry units on their approach. Okulicz-Kozaryn then ordered all units to fall back toward the Lithuanian border, units of the Border Protection Corps, as the most experienced, were to screen the withdrawal. Podpułkownik (Lieutenant Colonel) Podwysocki was dispatched to inform the Soviets that Polish forces did not intend to defend the city, but he was shot at and returned to the Polish lines. As Okulicz-Kozaryn had already left the city, Podwysocki decided to defend it, even though most of the forces previously in the city had left with Okulicz-Kozaryn.

The first Soviet attack on the evening of 18 September was repulsed by the Polish defenders. Subsequently, the Soviets continued to push into Wilno. By the end of the day the Soviets had secured the airfield and made several thrusts into the city, taking the Rasos Cemetery.

By the morning of 19 September, the advanced Soviet armoured units had been reinforced with infantry and cavalry. The Polish defenders delayed the Soviet advance, particularly by holding the bridges, but later that day the poorly coordinated Polish defence collapsed and the Soviets took control of the city.

== Aftermath ==
Polish units had either surrendered or withdrawn, disorganized, towards the Lithuanian border or deeper into Poland.

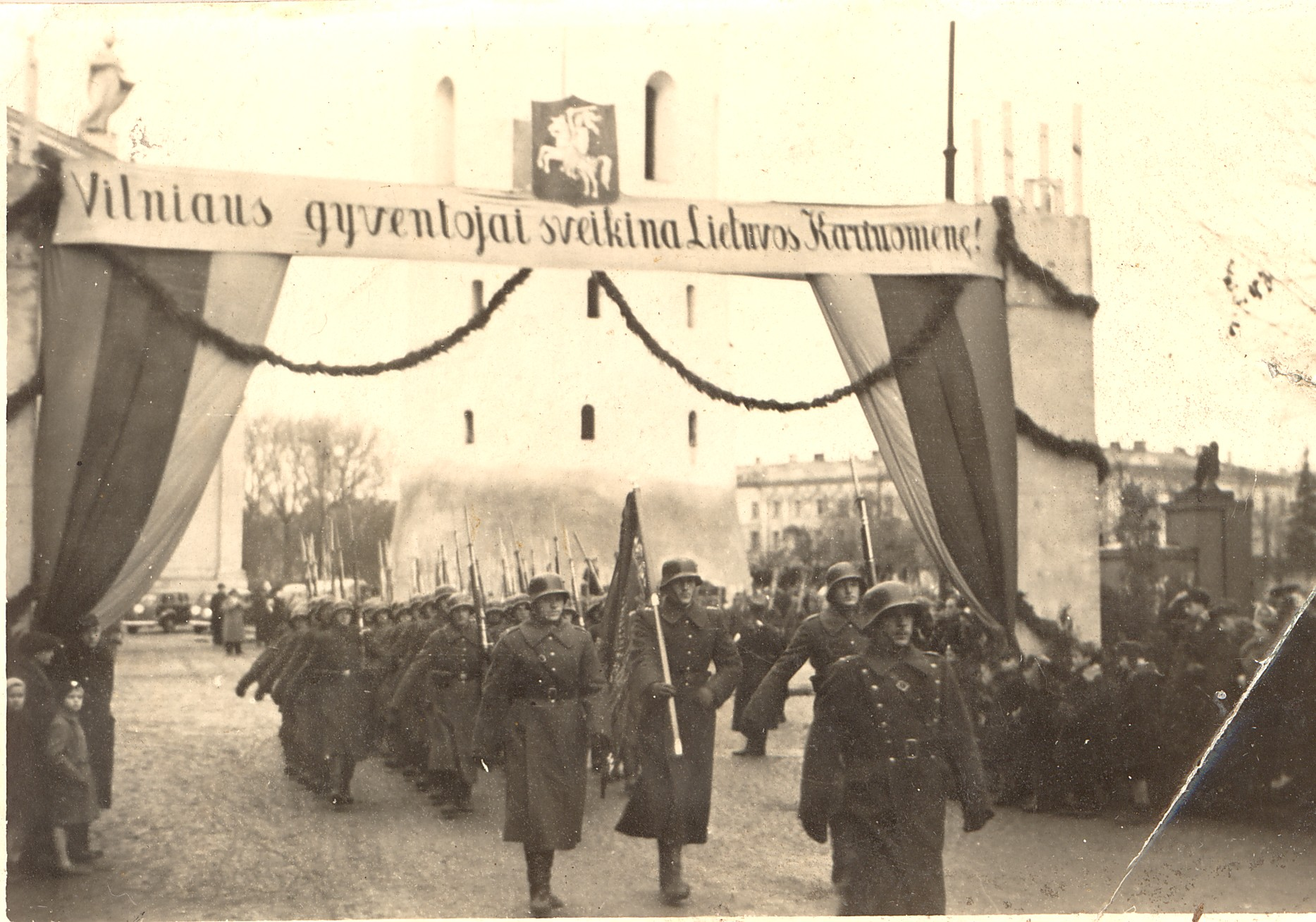
Celebrations of Vilnius (Wilno) return to Lithuania near Vilnius Cathedral in 1939. The banner reads: Inhabitants of Vilnius welcome the Lithuanian Army

The Soviets transferred the city to Lithuania according to the Soviet–Lithuanian Mutual Assistance Treaty. Lithuanian troops entered the city on 27–28 October.

The defence of Wilno has been criticized by some Polish historians, who point out that if properly organized, the Polish forces would have been able to hold on and delay the Soviets by several days, similar to the defence of Grodno (in which some of the units which withdrew from Wilno took part). Nonetheless, this could have only been a symbolic defence, as the Polish forces had no real way of stopping the overwhelming Soviet advance.

== See also ==
- List of World War II military equipment of Poland
- List of Soviet Union military equipment of World War II

== Bibliography ==
- Grzelak, Czesław (1993). Wilno 1939 (in Polish). Warszawa.
- Iwanowski, Lech (2000). Wilnianie we wrześniu 1939 r.: prolog epopei (in Polish). Bydgoszcz.
