= Kaliński =

Kaliński, feminine: Kalińska is a Polish toponymic surname derived from any of places named Kalina. Russian equivalent: Kalinsky/Kalinskaya. Lithuanian: Kalinskis.

- Enzo Kalinski
- Jon Kalinski
- Maciej Kaliński
- Władysław Kaliński
