= Battle of Kodziowce =

World War II battle (1939)

Date	23 September 1939 to 24 September 1939
Location	Kodziowce and surrounding area

Belligerents
Soviet Union	Poland

Commanders and leaders
(Soviet Union) Ivan Boldin (Soviet Union) Alexey Kurkin (Soviet Union) Maj. Chuvakin	(Second Polish Republic) Wacław Przeździecki (Second Polish Republic) Edmund Heldut-Tarnasiewicz (Second Polish Republic) Major Żukowski

Units involved
2nd Light Tank Brigade	Wołkowysk Cavalry Brigade

The Battle of Kodziowce was a battle that took place at Kodziowce (now in modern Belarus) that occurred on 23-24 September 1939 during the Soviet invasion of Poland. It was fought between the Polish Wołkowysk Cavalry Brigade commanded by Wacław Przeździecki and Edmund Heldut-Tarnasiewicz who were retreating from the Battle of Grodno (1939) and the Soviet 2nd Light Armoured Brigade under Col. Alexey Kurkin. The 2nd Light Tank Brigade was mainly composed of BT-7 light fast tanks and a small amount of BA-I armoured cars.

== Prelude ==
Most of the Polish troops fighting the Battle of Grodno (1939) including the Wołkowysk Cavalry Brigade were able to retreat north and so avoid capture by the victorious Soviet forces to Grandzicze and Hoża. The forces from Grodno occupied the area around Sopoćkiń. It was planned to reorganised the retreated forces by uniting them under the structure of an Infantry Division after moving them to the area around Sejny. Wacław Przeździecki planned on 22 September that all of his troops would breakthrough to Lithuania through areas currently lightly held by Soviet forces.

The 2nd Light Tank Brigade under Col Alexey Kurkin received orders from Ivan Boldin commander of the force it was part of the Dzerzhinsky Cavalry-Mechanized Group on September 21 at 11:00 am to form a new group with tanks, armoured cars and motorised troops as well as with anti-tank and anti-aircraft weapons to be commanded by Maj. Chuvakin. This group was to neutralise Polish units in Augustów Primeval Forest and capture Augustów and Suwałki.The group set off to accomplish their objectives at 3 pm on September 21.

The group of Maj. Chuvakin separated likely after resting at a village called Bieliczany. One of the separated groups from the original group unit went to Sylwanowce and then Kodziowce. Another separated group went to Kownia and Sopoćkina. On 23 September at Sylwanowce Soviet troops heard gunfire and then Soviet armoured cars were attacked by Polish troops.

== Battle ==
After a clash between Soviet and Polish forces the Soviets withdrew with Polish forces in pursuit. Early in the afternoon when Polish forces were exhausted 7 Soviet tanks surprised the defending Poles around Kodziowce and broke through Polish lines. Also at this time Polish Lancers probably of 4th Squadron from 101st Uhlan Regiment spotted resting Soviet troops to the east. Major Żukowski commander of the 101st Uhlan Regiment who was commanding from Kodziowce decided to defeat the resting Soviet forces with a surprise assault at 4 am next morning.

Meanwhile Soviet armour under Maj Czuwakina attacked from the east of Sopoćkiń after arriving in the vicinity on 3am the previous day. This meant that the rear of a company from KOP Sejny Battalion under Lieutenant Józef Smereczyński on the edge of Sopoćkiń was vulnerable forcing the company to retreat. After this the Soviet armoured continued to advance into Sopoćkiń itself being opposed by the reserve units of the KOP Sejny battalion who after an hour withdrew from Sopoćkiń. In the morning of the next day the KOP Sejny Battalion withdrew to the Augustów Canal after halting the Soviet advance.

While the KOP Sejny Battalion was fighting Soviet armour the Polish forces around Kodziowce including the 101st Uhlan Regiment were forced to retreat due to realising they would not be able to successfully defend against a new incoming group of Soviet armour. The retreat was rapid with dead and wounded being left behind. Major Żukowski having been gravely wounded in the fighting was evacuated so he could be retreated with other Polish forces around Kodziowce. After retreating Polish forces stood firm being able to repel the last Soviet attack on 8am on 24 September. After this most of the Polish force used the respite to gradually retire to Lithuania unit by unit under Soviet harassment at which point they were safe from Soviet forces in the neutral country. Some Polish units chose to stay in Poland to keep fighting the invaders instead of seeking sanctuary in Lithuania.

== Aftermath ==
Despite heavy casualties received in the fighting in Poland including commander of 3rd squadron Lieutenant Stanisław Dobrzański. Kpr, General Józef Olszyna-Wilczyński and Maj. Żukowski who died of his wounds on the way to hospital in Lithuania the 101st Uhlan Regiment did not break up when it reached the safety of Lithuania.Maj. Żukowski was later awarded the Virtuti Militari Cross V Class the Virtuti Militari Cross being the highest military award of Poland for his role in the fighting. Polish forces in the battle took casualties of roughly three companies of infantry and official Soviet figures say they suffered casualties of 4 tanks 3 armoured cars and 11 killed and 14 wounded. However Polish sources place casualties significantly higher at 22 armoured fighting vehicles.

== In popular culture ==
The son of a Polish soldier who fought at the battle Włodzimierz Ścisłowski wrote about the battle in a poem dedicated to his father the title being Zostały tylko ślady podków which when translated to English means Only traces of horseshoes remained(Poem in Polish in reference). This later became a very popular song in Poland after it was performed at a soldiers song festival in the 1970s.

== See also ==
- List of World War II military equipment of Poland
- List of Soviet Union military equipment of World War II
