= Edmund Heldut-Tarnasiewicz =

Colonel of the Polish Army (1892–1952)

- Edmund Heldut-Tarnasiewicz
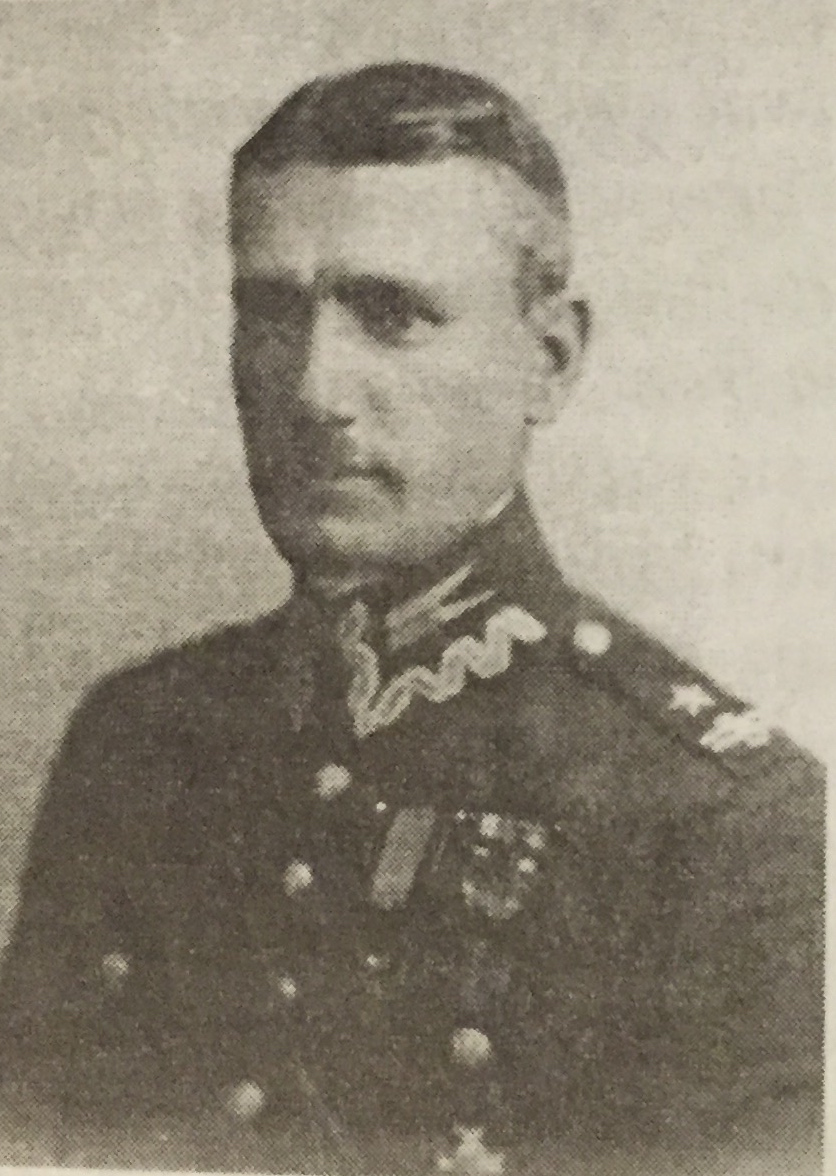
- Heldut-Tarnasiewicz (before 1934)
- Born: 17 July 1892; Radom, Russian Empire
- Died: 2 April 1952 (aged 59); London, United Kingdom
- Military career
- Branch: First Cadre Company; Wielkopolska Cavalry Brigade; Polish Legions in World War I Second Army (Poland); Polish Armed Forces in the West
- Service years: 1914–1945
- Rank: General
- Units: First Cavalry Regiment of the Polish Legions; First Cavalry Regiment; 16th Greater Poland Uhlan Regiment; 201st Cavalry Regiment → 3rd Cavalry regiment Non-Commissioned Officer Professional School of Cavalry; 4th Regiment of Mounted Riflemen on Land in Łęczycka; Centre for Replacement of Suwalki and Podlasie of Cavalry Brigade; Reserve Cavalry Brigade Wolkowysk; 10th Armoured Cavalry Brigade
- Conflicts: World War I, Polish–Soviet War, World War II (Invasion of Poland, Soviet invasion of Poland: Battle of Grodno (1939))
- Awards: Virtuti Militari, Order of Polonia Restituta, Cross of Independence, Cross of Valour (Poland)

Edmund Wacław Heldut - Tarnasiewicz alias " Heldut " (17 July 1892–April 1952). He was the senior colonel and commander of the Polish Army cavalry, a senior military official of the Polish Armed Forces in the West, who received Poland's highest military award, the Virtuti Militari, one of the oldest military decorations in the world still in use. He was heavily involved in World War I, the Polish–Soviet War, and World War II (Invasion of Poland, Soviet invasion of Poland: Battle of Grodno (1939)). Heldut was promoted to General, but the promotion was never confirmed due to the outbreak of World War II. On October 6, 2021, President Andrzej Duda officially and posthumously confirmed Heldut to Brigadier General.

== Early life and career ==
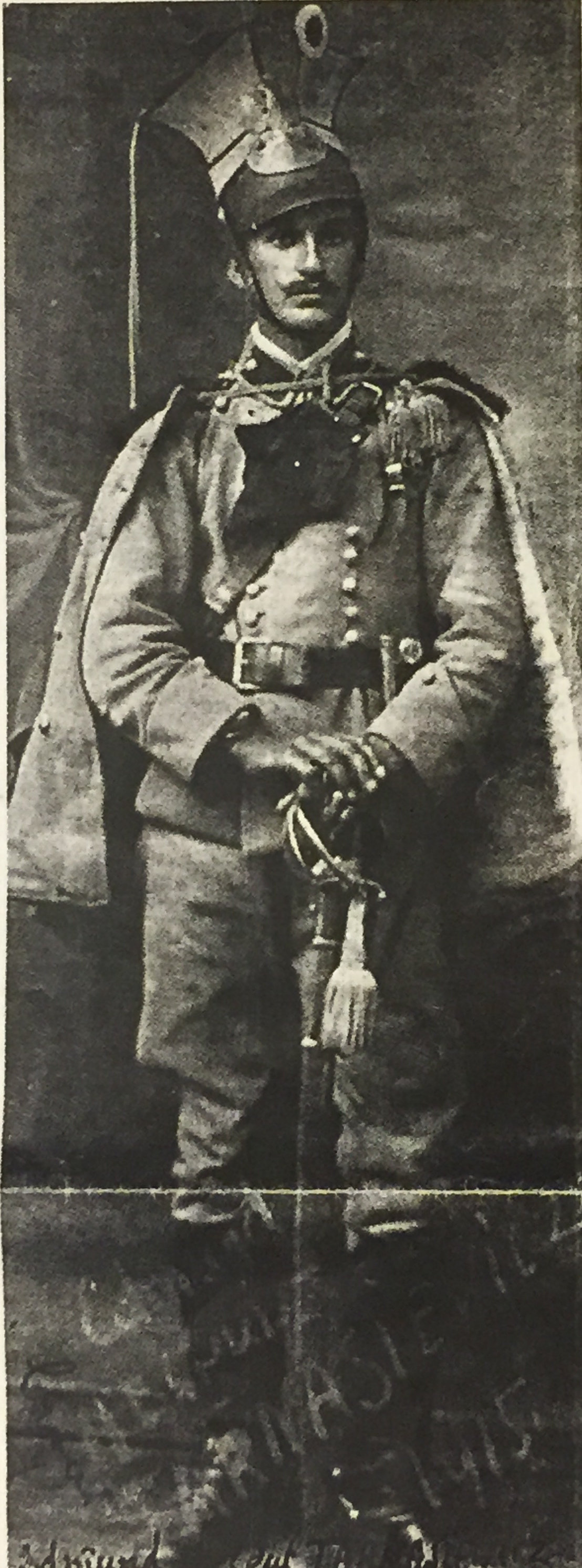
Senior Uhlan 1918

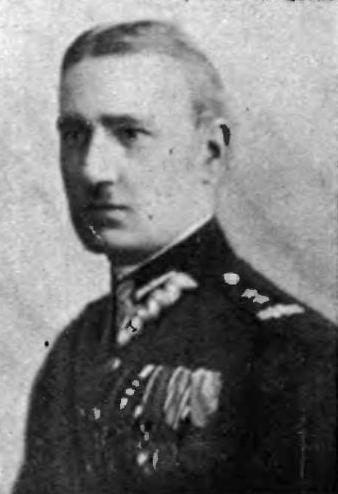
Commander of the Polish Army Cavalry

Edmund Heldut was born on 17 July 1892, the son of John and Victoria from the family of Gajewski. He graduated from high school in 1909 in his home city of Radom and then from the School of Wawelberg and Rotwand in 1912 (the school was absorbed by the Warsaw University of Technology in 1951). In the latter year, he enrolled at the Ghent University, Belgium and was active with the Riflemen's Association.

In July 1914, he began work in Kraków as an instructor. Upon the outbreak of World War I he joined the First Cadre Company. From 20 August 1914 he served in a military branch led by Władysław Belina-Prażmowski later becoming the 1st Uhlans Regiment of Polish Legions in World War I. In this unit, Tarnasiewicz stayed until the Oath Crisis in 1917. He was interned and imprisoned in a camp as a prisoner of war in Szczypiorno. During the service in this legion, he attained the rank of Senior Uhlan. He used the pseudonym of "Heldut", and later took this name as his official name. After his release, he enrolled at the Warsaw University of Technology in 1918.

At the end of the war in 1918, he joined the Polish Army. At the beginning of November 1918 he was sent to Chełm, where his loyalty resided with his squadrons who were forming the 1st Uhlans Regiment of Polish Legions once again. The organization was based on legionnaires patterns of the uhlans of the Napoleonic period; the Chelm Land was chosen for the new house of the uhlan chevaliers. From November 24, he was the commander of the platoon. From 8 January 1919 this unit was renamed the 1st Chevau-léger Regiment "Józef Piłsudski" and then 1st Light Cavalry Regiment. From 20 April 1919, Heldut became the squadron's commander.

He participated in the Polish–Soviet War, during which he was wounded near the river Daugava on 5 September 1919. He was appointed the Poruchik on 1 May 1920. For his deeds of war in the ranks of the 1st Light Cavalry Regiment, he received the Order of Military Virtue or the Virtuti Militari.

From 8 July 1920, he served in the 16th Greater Poland Uhlan Regiment as a podporuchik of cavalry, and commanded by Major Ludwik Kmicic-Skrzyński who appointed him commander of the 3rd Squadron. In this function he participated in battles against the Soviets (for service in the 15 ACS received the Cross of Valour).

From 20 October 1920, he was commander of the squadron in 3rd Masovian Light Cavalry Regiment. From 24 January to 1 September 1921, he was assigned to the Cavalry Training Center in Grudziądz. On 16 September 1921 he was the deputy commander of the 3rd Masovian Light Cavalry Regiment in Suwałki garrison.

Later he was commandeering military education: he functioned as the commander of non-commissioned officers school, then as commander of the Reserve Officers School. After completing the course at the Training Centre in Rembertów from 4 June to 18 October 1925, again he served in the 3rd Regiment of Cavalry. He served as the Rittmeister. He was then promoted to major of the cavalry from 1 January 1927. From December 1927 to 1929 he held the position of commander of the Cavalry School of Non-Commissioned Officer Professional in Jaworow. He was appointed lieutenant colonel of the cavalry from 1 January 1930. From 1 July 1930, he served as deputy commander of the 4th Mounted Rifle Regiment of Łęczyca in Plock.

Later, he returned to the 16th Wielkopolska Cavalry Regiment, stationed in Bydgoszcz, where from 27 February 1932 served as its commander. At that time, he was appointed colonel of cavalry from 1 January 1935.

On 26 January 1935, at the palace in Bialowieza, the Polish President Ignacy Mościcki gave him the rank of colonel with seniority and the 2nd most powerful position in the body of cavalry officers. Together with him the rank of colonel was only received by two cavalry officers Witold Dzierżykraj-Morawski (lok. 1) and Leon Mitkiewicz-Żołłtek (lok. 3). Due to Colonel Heldut-Tarnasiewicz's initiative, all the families of the fallen in the battles for independence, they were awarded Polish lancers unit commemorative badges ID cards. In July 1939, he was commander of the prestigious Cadet School of Cavalry in Grudziadz at the Cavalry Training Centre, equivalent to West Point or United States Military Academy in Poland. There he was promoted to Brigadier General, but the promotion was never confirmed due to the outbreak of World War II.

After the outbreak of World War II during the 1939 September Campaign, he was the commander of the Suwalski Reserve Centre and the Podlasie Cavalry Brigade (his successor in this function was Gen. Brig. Wacław Przeździecki. He was an organizer and commander of the Reserve Cavalry Brigade Wolkowysk which played a crucial role in the defense of Poland after the Soviet invasion of Poland.

After the Soviet aggression on Poland since 17 September 1939 he participated in the defense of Poland in the fight against the Red Army (including the 21 September Battle of Grodno). The Soviet invasion of Poland was the implementation of the Molotov–Ribbentrop Pact agreement signed in Moscow on 23 August 1939 by the Minister of Foreign Affairs of the Third Reich Joachim von Ribbentrop and the People's Commissar of Foreign Affairs of the USSR and the President of the Council of People's Commissars Vyacheslav Molotov.

The Soviet aggressors attacked in the direction of Vilnius, Suwalki, Brest on the Bug, Lublin, Lvov and Kolomyia. The most important battles of Polish troops (mainly by the Border Protection Corps, the Reserve Cavalry Brigade Wolkowysk (led by Heldut) and SGO Polesie) were: the defence of Vilnius, Grodno and Lvov and Fortified Zone Deer, as well as clashes in Szack, Wytyczno, Jabłoń and Milanów.

Even with Soviet victory, the remaining Polish garrison in Grodno managed to kill 800 Soviet troops and at least 10 tanks. After the battle, the remaining forces of the Reserve Cavalry Brigade Wolkowysk led by Heldut, broke through the lines of the reconnaissance battalion of the 2nd Light Tank Brigade in the Battle of Kodziowce and headed for the Augustów Forest. He then retreated to internment in Lithuania.

After his release and the official surrender of Poland he found himself in France and later in the United Kingdom. He was an officer in the Polish Armed Forces in the West. He held the position of commander of the Cadet School in the city of Edinburgh in Scotland, training men for the fight against the Axis powers. From 1942, he was the deputy commander of the 10th Armoured Cavalry Brigade.

== Personal life and legacy ==
In the 1920s, Tarnasiewicz married Wanda Leokadia, the daughter of a Szlachta noble Polish landowner Julian Vincent - Skalski, who has acquired the Vincent wealth. They had a daughter named Danuta (1929-2011, after her husband Brodowska, operating in the Polish National Armed Forces, later a teacher in Lublin) and a son named Andrew.

Heldut-Tarnasiewicz was a friend of Józef Piłsudski attending his funeral in 1935. Their relationship reaches back to World War I when Heldut joined the First Cadre Company founded by Józef Piłsudski. After WWI, Poland faced further aggressions from the East. The Polish victory against the Soviets in 1921 was a great boost to Heldut's military career which raised him to the high rank of senior colonel of the Polish cavalry. The historic victory against the Soviets in the Polish-Soviet War stopped Bolshevism in spreading into Western and other parts of Europe. The British military historian and general J. F. C. Fuller ranks the Battle of Warsaw (1920), and the Polish victory in the war, as one of the most decisive victories in history since it prevented Soviet influence from spreading to the borders of Germany, Hungary and Romania at a critical stage in these countries.

In July 1939, he was the Commander of the prestigious Cadet School of Cavalry in Grudziadz at the Cavalry Training Centre, equivalent to USA's West Point, a position only held by a General. There he was promoted to General, but the promotion was never confirmed due to the outbreak of World War II. Throughout his military career, he continued to support the Allies of World War II in the struggle to help defeat Nazi Germany. Even when he was forced to evacuate his homeland along with the Polish government-in-exile, he trained men for the front-line against the Axis powers all the way from the highlands of Scotland where he was commissioned and stationed.

The newly installed regime of People's Republic of Poland (1947-1989) by the Soviets tried to greatly diminish the achievements and recognition of great patriotic national heroes that took part in a war against them including Heldut.

Starting in 1944, he was investigated by the Regional Office of Internal Affairs in Lublin part of the Provisional Government of the Republic of Poland, created by Stalin. The new government did not recognize the Polish government-in-exile and proclaimed itself to be the legitimate government of Poland. After the war, Heldut remained in exile, residing in London, where he died on 2 April 1952. His remains were buried in Lublin.

== Military awards and orders ==
Virtuti Militari, Silver Cross
Order of Polonia Restituta, Commander's Cross
Order of Polonia Restituta, Officer's Cross
Cross of Independence, Ribbon bar of the Cross and Medal
Cross of Merit (Poland), Gold Cross of Merit
Cross of Valour (Poland), 4th Award
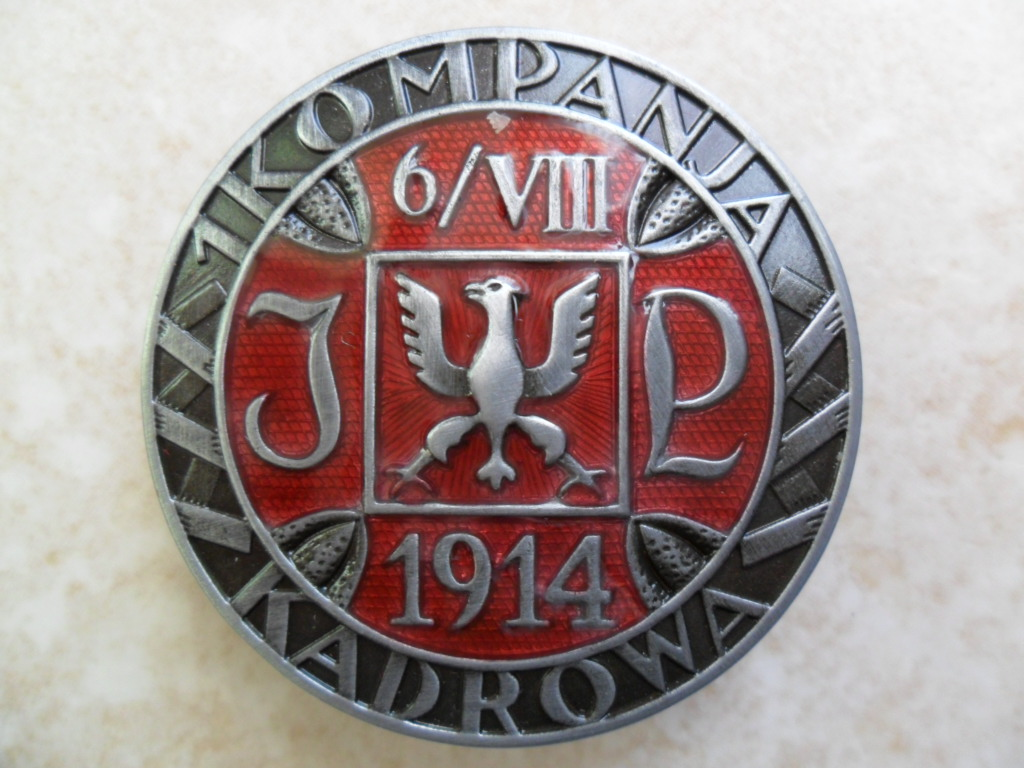
First Cadre Company Badge
