= 19th Infantry Division (Poland) =

The 19th Infantry Division (Polish: 19 Dywizja Piechoty, Lithuanian: 19-oji Pėstininkų Divizija) of the Polish Army was established in 1923 after the incorporation of Central Lithuania into Poland. It was part of the Prusy Army during the German-led Invasion of Poland. Later during the war, in the summer of 1944, the division was recreated as a Home Army unit, taking part in the Operation Ostra Brama in the summer of 1944.

== Background ==
During the Interbellum, the division was stationed in Vilnius (then named Wilno), which was part of the Second Polish Republic in 1922–1939.

== Operations ==
=== German invasion of Poland ===
The 19th Infantry Division under General Józef Kwaciszewski belonged to northern group of Prusy Army, under General Stefan Dąb-Biernacki. On September 5, 1939, the division was sent to Piotrków Trybunalski, where it faced the Wehrmacht's 1st Panzer Division of the XVI Army Corps. On September 6, following their victory in the battle of Piotrków Trybunalski, Germans captured General Kwaciszewski and the remains of the division withdrew due to mounting German pressure. On the evening of the September 7, the division's units were scattered and tried to break through the German lines and escape eastwards, towards the Vistula.

On September 8 Colonel Tadeusz Pełczyński began reconstruction of the division, with two infantry regiments (77th, 86th), and some artillery, which managed to cross the Vistula. Following the order of General Dab-Biernacki, the division was renamed to the 19th Infantry Brigade. The unit took part in the Battle of Tomaszów Lubelski, finally capitulating on September 27.

Lida was where the reserve center of the division was stationed.

=== Soviet invasion of Poland ===
On September 17, 1939, when news of the Soviet invasion of Poland reached the town, a 150-man strong assault company was formed in Lida with the task of reaching Wilno by breaking through the advancing Red Army. The plan was changed, and the company headed for Grodno, where it partook in the Battle of Grodno.

== Commanders ==
Until 1927, the division was commanded by General Michał Karaszewicz-Tokarzewski, who was replaced by General Tadeusz Kasprzycki (1927–1931). For most of the 1930s, the division was commanded by General Eugeniusz Godziejewski, who in mid-April 1936 was replaced by its last interbellum commandant, General Jozef Kwaciszewski.

== Order of battle ==
Initially, the division consisted of the following infantry regiments that were previously the armed forces of the Republic of Central Lithuania:

- 85th Wilno Regiment (formerly part of the 1st Lithuanian-Belarusian Division),
- 86th Minsk Regiment (formerly part of the 1st Lithuanian-Belarusian Division),
- 77th Kowno Regiment (formerly part of the 2nd Lithuanian-Belarusian Division).

== See also ==
- Polish army order of battle in 1939
- Polish contribution to World War II
- List of Polish divisions in World War II
