= 4th Niemen Uhlan Regiment =

Military unit

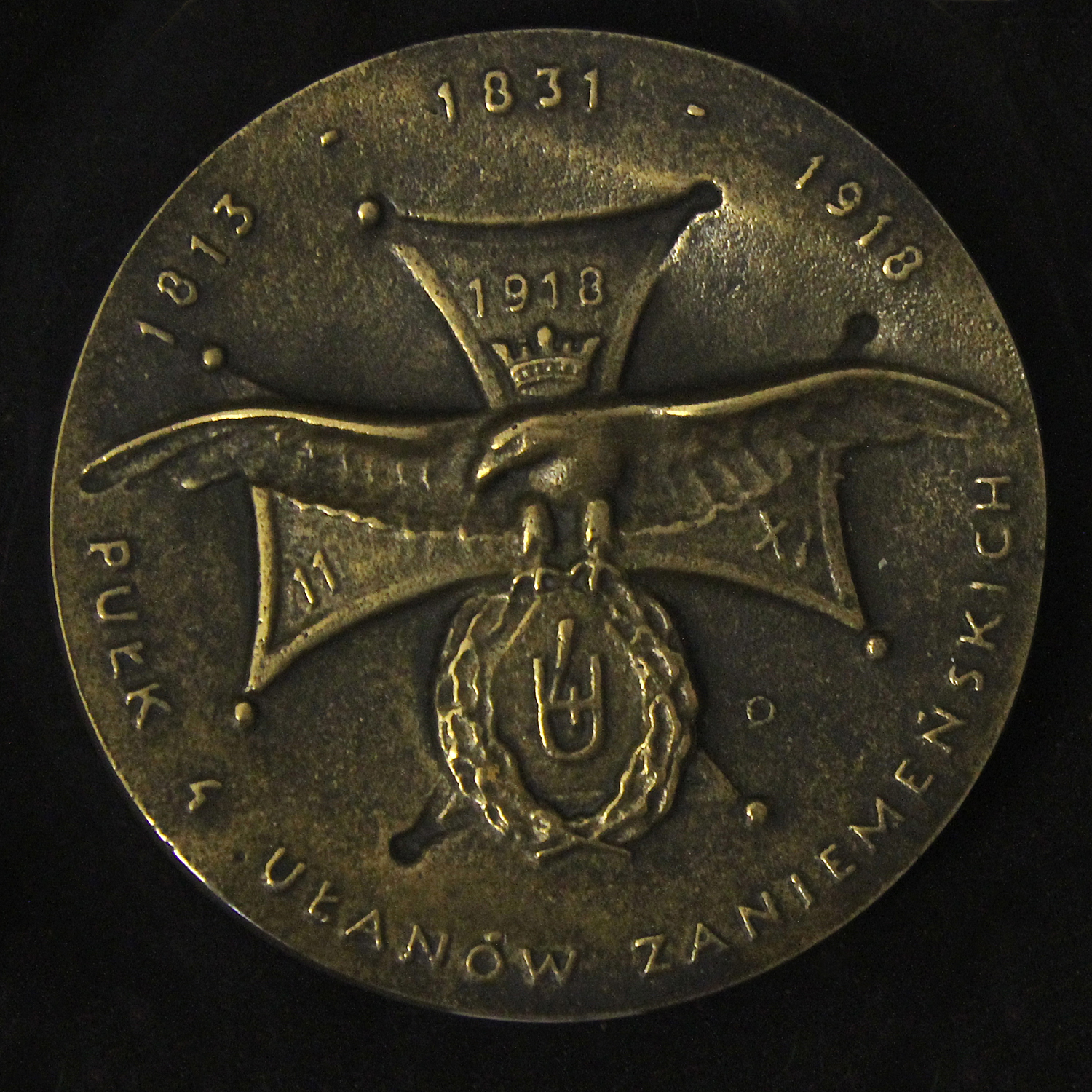
- Regimental medal
- Active: November 1918 – 27 September 1939
- Country: Poland
- Role: Cavalry
- Anniversaries: 9 July
- Engagements: Polish-Ukrainian War; Polish-Soviet War: Battle of Warsaw (1920); World War II: Invasion of Poland

4th Niemen Uhlan Regiment (Polish: 4 Pulk Ulanów Zaniemenskich, 4 pul.) was a cavalry unit of the Polish Army in the Second Polish Republic. It was garrisoned in the city of Vilnius, and it celebrated its day on 9 July, the anniversary of the 1920 Charge of Hrebionka.

== Beginnings ==
In the spring of 1918, General Józef Dowbor-Muśnicki ordered the formation of 4th Uhlan Regiment, as part of Polish I Corps in Russia. The idea was abandoned, to return in November 1918, when the regiment was formed in Warsaw, with its squadrons scattered in towns of former Congress Poland, such as Łomża, Mława, Płock, Włocławek, Białystok, and Konin. The newly formed regiment continued the traditions of 4th Uhlan Regiment of Congress Poland.

== Polish-Ukrainian and Polish–Soviet Wars ==
In January 1919, the regiment was sent to the area of Lwów, to fight in the Polish-Ukrainian War. On 10 May 1919, it was sent northwards, to Białystok and then Lida. It was the first Polish regiment to cross the Niemen river, after which it fought in Vilnius and Central Belarus.

In the summer of 1920, the regiment was involved in heavy fighting with the Red Army. Among others, it destroyed three Soviet infantry regiments in the Battle of Hrebionka (July 2, 1920), and then fought in the outskirts of Warsaw. Following the Polish victory in the Battle of Warsaw (1920), it chased the retreating enemy, reaching the line of the Berezina River.

== Second Polish Republic ==
After the war, the regiment was sent to Wilno, to remain garrisoned in this city until the 1939 Invasion of Poland. In 1927, it was officially named 4th Regiment of Niemen Uhlans, to emphasize the fact that it was the first unit to cross the Niemen and advance eastwards in 1919. Among soldiers who served in the regiment was Colonel Zygmunt Szendzielarz, who commanded its 3rd Squadron.

== 1939 Invasion of Poland ==
In September 1939, the regiment commanded by Colonel Ludomir Wysocki belonged to Wilenska Cavalry Brigade. Mobilized on 23 August 1939, it was sent by rail from Wilno to central Poland, to join Prusy Army. On September 2, the regiment detrained at Piotrków Trybunalski, and on the next day it concentrated in the forests near the village of Lubien. In the night of September 5/6, it was sent to the area of Sulejow, to prepare defensive positions along the Pilica river. On September 7 it concentrated near Przysucha.

On 8 September south of Radom, 4th Regiment of Niemen Uhlans fought a bloody battle against advancing panzer units of the Wehrmacht. The battle lasted several hours, and in the night, the regiment retreated towards Maciejowice. It then defended the Vistula crossing near Magnuszew, suffering heavy losses and losing its heavy weaponry. After crossing the Vistula, elements of the regiment concentrated along the Wieprz river, where it was reorganized and merged with elements of the 13th Wilno Uhlan Regiment as well as 36th Infantry Division. The new unit, reinforced with a few tanks headed towards Świdnik. As part of improvised Cavalry Brigade of General Władysław Anders, it fought its way southwards, trying to reach the Hungarian border. On 26 September, it managed to cross the Przemyśl – Lwów highway, but was later halted by the Red Army, and capitulated to the Germans on 27 September.

== Commandants of the Regiment ==
- Colone Stanislaw Rawicz-Dziewulski (1918–1921)
- Major Czeslaw Kozierowski (1921–1932)
- Colonel Ludwik Schweizer (1932–1936)
- Colonel Zdzislaw Chrzastowski (1936–1938)
- Colonel Ludomir Wysocki (1938–1939)

== Symbols of the Regiment ==
The 4th Regiment of Niemen Uhlans had two flags. The first one was funded by the residents of Kujawy, and handed to the soldiers in Włocławek in 1919. The second flag was funded by the residents of the lands of Lida, Minsk and Ejszyszki, and presented to the soldiers by Marshall Józef Piłsudski in Wilno, on 14 April 1922. The fate of both flags is unknown.

On 13 December 1921, Polish military authorities accepted the regimental badge. Its shape was similar to the Virtuti Militari Cross, with a Polish eagle superimposed on it. The cross had the date 11 XI 1918, number 4 and letter U. The badge was designed by Witold Lada-Zablocki and manufactured by Teodor Filipski from Wilno.

The traditions of the regiment were continued by the 3rd Masurian Recce Battalion of Colonel Jan Kozietulski.

== Sources ==
- Kazimierz Satora: Opowieści wrześniowych sztandarów. Warszawa: Instytut Wydawniczy Pax, 1990. ISBN 83-211-1104-1

== See also ==
- Polish cavalry
