= Polish 1st Infantry Division =

The term Polish 1st Infantry Division might refer to three distinct infantry units of the Polish Army, fighting during various stages of the World War II or during World War I

- Polish 1st Legions Infantry Division, formed out of the Polish Legions in World War I and fighting in the Polish-Bolshevik War and Invasion of Poland of 1939
- Polish 1st Tadeusz Kościuszko Infantry Division, formed by Zygmunt Berling in the USSR and fighting alongside the Red Army on the eastern front of World War II
- Polish 1st Rifleman Division formed in France in 1918, from 1919 known as the Polish 13th Infantry Division

== See also ==
- 1st Grenadiers Division (Poland)
- 1st Armoured Division (Poland)
