= Józef Kwaciszewski =

Polish general (1890–1958)

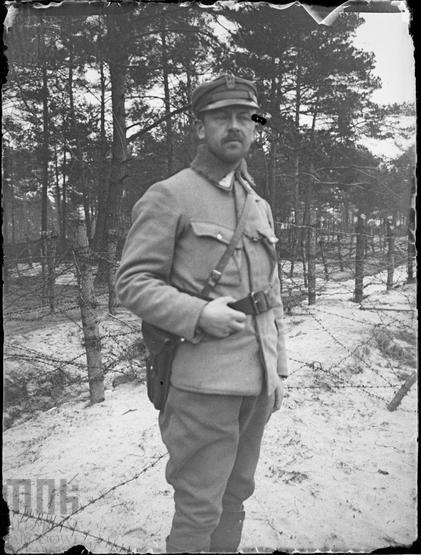
Józef Kwaciszewski in 1916

Józef Kwaciszewski (1890-1958) was a Polish general.

During World War I he was a member of the Polish Legions. He became the commander of the 18th Polish Infantry Division in 1928, and the 19th Polish Infantry Division in 1936. During the German invasion of Poland he commanded the 19th Division, which was a part of the Army Prusy. Following the Battle of Piotrków Trybunalski, he was captured by the Germans and spent the rest of the war in the German prisoner of war camps, mainly in Oflag VII-A Murnau.
