= Kalinsky =

Kalinsky (Russian: Кали́нский); feminine form: Kalinskaya (Russian: Калинская) is a Russian surname. Polish equivalent: Kaliński. Notable people with the surname include:

- Anna Kalinskaya (born 1998), Russian tennis player
- George Kalinsky (1936–2025), American photographer
- Nikolay Kalinsky (born 1993), Russian footballer
- Tom Kalinske (born 1944), American businessman
