= 29th Infantry Division (Poland) =

29th Grodno Infantry Division (Polish: 29 Grodzienska Dywizja Piechoty) was a unit of the Polish Army during the interbellum period. It was created in early 1920s, after the army of Republic of Central Lithuania was absorbed by the Polish Army. The newly created unit took over regiments that had been part of 1st Lithuanian-Belarusian Infantry Division.

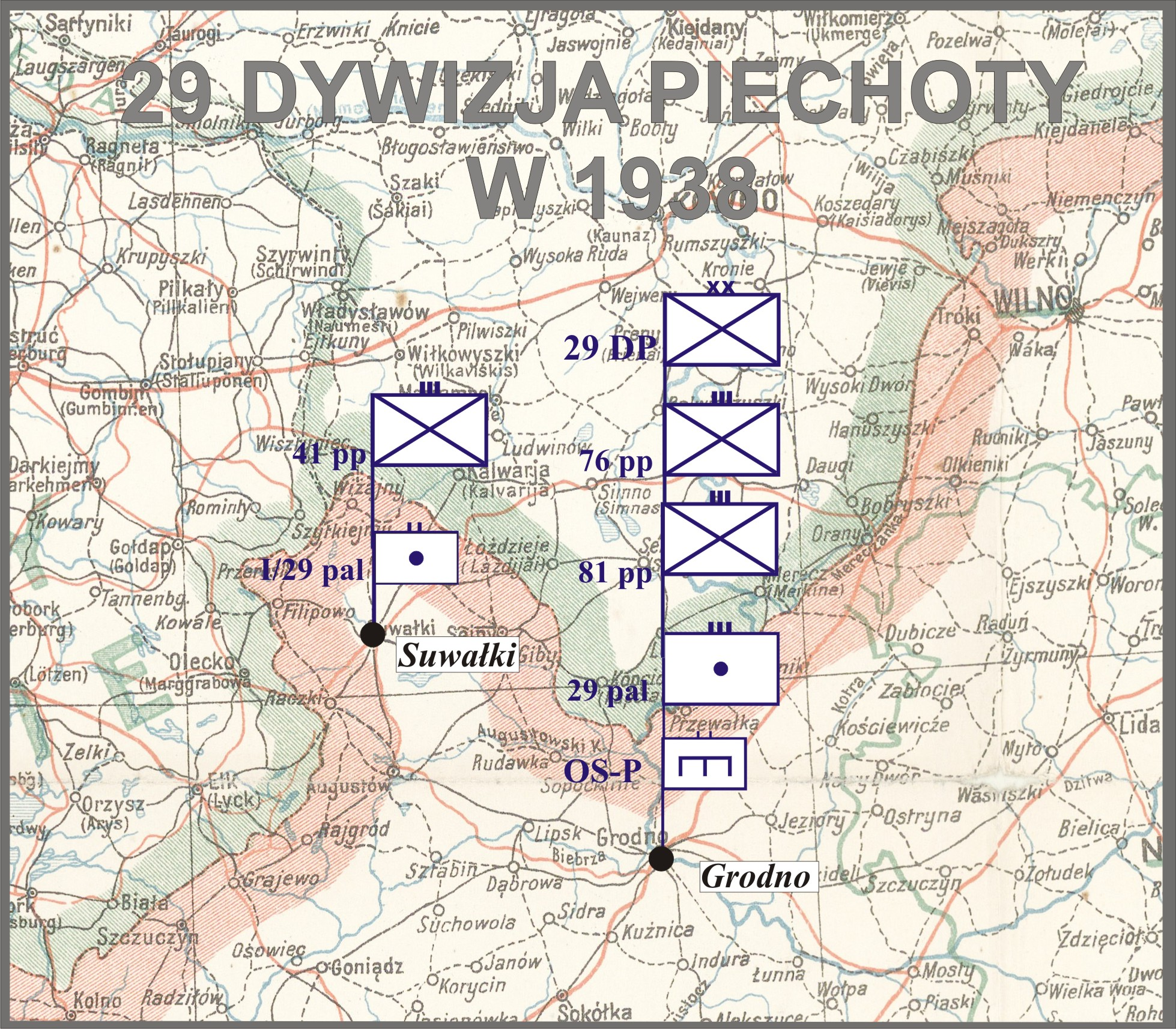
29 DP w 1938

The 29th I.D. was stationed in Grodno, with one regiment garrisoned in Suwałki. It consisted of these units:

- 41st Suwałki Infantry Regiment of Marshall Józef Piłsudski, stationed in Suwałki,
- 76th Lida Infantry Regiment of Ludwik Narbutt, stationed in Grodno,
- 81st Grodno Rifles Regiment of King Stefan Batory, stationed in Grodno,
- 29th Light Artillery Regiment, stationed in Grodno.

== Polish September Campaign ==
In August 1939 the Division, under Colonel Ignacy Oziewicz, was transferred to the reserve Prusy Army of General Stefan Dąb-Biernacki. On September 1, first day of the war, it unloaded from trains in the area of Skierniewice. Then, it marched towards Rawa Mazowiecka and on September 3, it took up defensive positions along the Pilica.

On September 5, German 1st Panzer Division, after crushing regiments of the Polish 19th Infantry Division, advanced towards Tomaszów Mazowiecki. At that moment, commandant of the Prusy Army, unaware of the situation, was planning to counterattack the Germans, which was supposed to take place on the night of September 5–6. However, on September 5, at 9 pm, commander in chief of the Polish Army informed him to withdraw north of Piotrków Trybunalski. This order did not reach all Polish units, and the 76th Lida Infantry Regiment attacked the Germans, managing to capture a village. Soon afterwards, Polish advance was stopped.

Other regiments of the Division also attacked the Germans, along the road from Piotrkow to Radomsko and fighting with bayonets. In the course of the time, however, the Wehrmacht resistance stiffened and, supported by artillery and tanks, the Germans counterattacked at 6 am on September 6. After bloody skirmishes, most Polish soldiers died, those who survived retreated to the forests in the area of Koło.

On September 7, the Division continued withdrawal eastwards, to the Vistula. However, it was destroyed by the German 13th Motorized Division and ceased to exist as an organized unit. Last groups of soldiers crossed the Vistula near Dęblin by September 13.

== See also ==
- Polish army order of battle in 1939
- Polish contribution to World War II
- List of Polish divisions in World War II
