= Battle of Grodno (1939) =

Battle of the Soviet invasion of Poland in WWII

Coordinates: 53°40′00″N 23°50′00″E

- Part of the Soviet Invasion of Poland in the European theatre of World War II
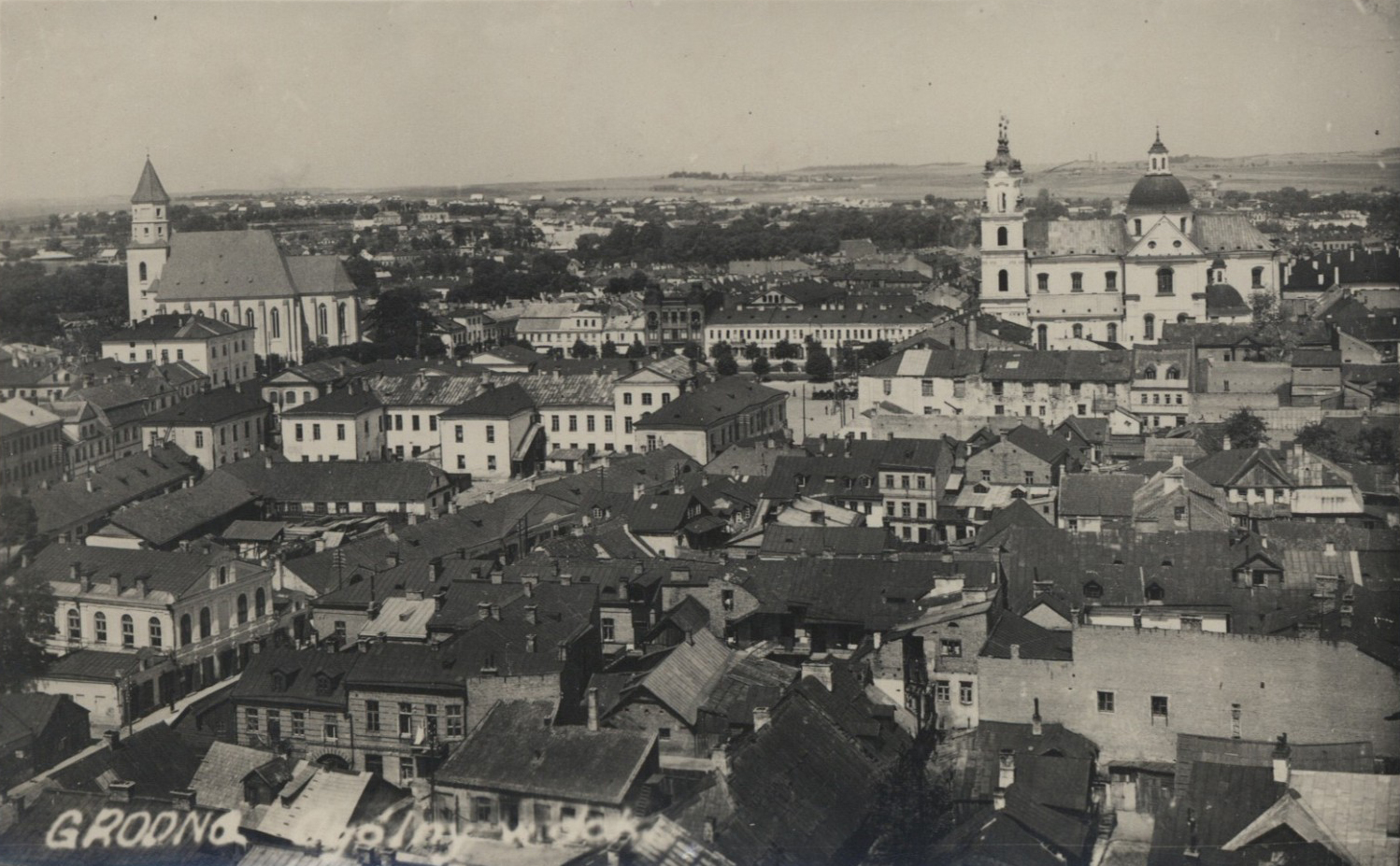
- Overhead view of Grodno, 1935
Date	20 September 1939 – 22 September 1939 (2 days)
Location	Grodno, Białystok Voivodeship, Poland
Result	Soviet victory

Belligerents
Soviet Union	Poland

Commanders and leaders
(Soviet Union) Ivan Boldin (Soviet Union) Mikhail Petrov	(Second Polish Republic) Wacław Przeździecki (Second Polish Republic) Józef Olszyna-Wilczyński (executed) (Second Polish Republic) Edmund Heldut-Tarnasiewicz

Units involved
15th Tank Corps	

Strength
Unknown number of tanks and infantry	2,000–2,500 (September 20); 3,500–4,000 (September 21); 2 AA guns

Casualties and losses
Soviet counts: 57 KIA; 159 WIA; 23 AFVs Polish counts: 800 KIA, MIA and wounded	Soviet counts: 644 KIA; 1,543 captured

The Battle of Grodno took place between 20 September and 22 September 1939, during the Soviet invasion of Poland. It was fought between improvised Polish units under General Wacław Przeździecki and Soviet Red Army troops of Komkor Ivan Boldin's Dzerzhinsky Cavalry Mechanized Group, at the time in a non-aggression agreement with Nazi Germany under the Ribbentrop-Molotov Pact.

== Prelude ==
The Soviet aggression caught much of the eastern Poland virtually undefended, as most of the Polish forces from the area had already been transferred to the German front. After breaking through overstretched defences of the Border Protection Corps, the Soviet 15th Tank Corps began a fast advance towards the city of Grodno. Commander of the pre-war Grodno Military Area Command Gen. Józef Olszyna-Wilczyński, together with the mayor of Grodno Roman Sawicki, embarked on organizing city defences, based mostly on march battalions, volunteers, Boy Scouts and police forces.

In the interwar period, Grodno was one of the strongest garrisons of the Polish Army. The commands of District Corps No. 3 and the 29th Infantry Division were quartered there, as were two infantry regiments and one light artillery regiment. Beginning in January 1938, the District Corps No. 3 was commanded by brigadier general Józef Olszyna-Wilczyński. In August 1939, after the mobilization, the 29th Infantry Regiment under command of Colonel Ignacy Oziewicz was sent to the region of concentration of Prussian Army. From the excess of troops there was formed the Operational Group "Grodno" (about 7,000 soldiers) with a goal of defending western and northwest sides of the city. Nonetheless, on 10 September OG was disbanded and the best troops were sent for defense of Lwów. Up to 12 September, the certified leader of the Fortified Zone of Grodno was colonel Bohdan Hulewicz, who made orders for defense of the city, however, against German troops. One of his crucial decisions was to create a stock of bottles with highly flammable mixture. Soldiers and volunteers were trained in using these. Grodno had been suffering from warfare since 1 September. That day, German bombers destroyed weaponry storehouses and military warehouses by Karolin. Roughly half of the city's military equipment and ammunition were destroyed this way. There were also casualties, and the attacks continued.

=== Soviet invasion of Poland ===
On September 17, as a result of rumours about Soviet aggression on Poland, a communist sabotage happened to the city, which was however suppressed quickly. On September 18, general J.Olszyn-Wilczyński arrived to the city from Pińsk. He did not believe the city could or should be defended any longer and ordered some troops to retreat into the region of Sopoćkiń and Kalet to cover forces retreating to internment in Lithuania. The same day, the leader of the command of District Corps left the city, without appointing any officer responsible for further defense. District head Walicki and president of the city Cieński also moved out. Another wave of communistic supporters came out; this time they took over the city centre's Batory Square. The 31st Guard Battalion had its alert platoon in action, resulting in elimination of the threat. Poles mounted machine guns on the towers of nearby churches of the city.

== Comparison of Forces ==
=== Polish ===
General Wacław Przeździecki's Grodno Defense Group included Edmund Heldut-Tarnasiewicz's Wołkowysk Cavalry Brigade, Stanisław Szostak's 32nd Armoured Reconnaissance Group, and the 94th Artillery Battery.

=== Soviet ===
Komkor Ivan Boldin's Dzerzhinsky Cavalry-Mechanized Group included the 6th Cavalry Corps (4th, 6th, and 11th Cavalry Divisions), the 5th Rifle Corps (4th and 13th Rifle Divisions), and the 15th Tank Corps. The 15th Tank Corps, commanded by Mikhail Petrov, included Kombrig Alexey Kurkin's 2nd Tank Brigade, Colonel Ivan Yushchuk's 27th Tank Brigade, and Colonel Berdnikov's 20th Motor Rifle and Machine Gun Brigade. The Soviet troops also included the 21st Tank Brigade.

== Battle ==
Map showing Soviet tank formations advances into eastern Poland

Ill-equipped, undermanned and lacking any anti-tank artillery, the Polish defenders relied mostly on improvised anti-tank means such as bottles of gasoline or turpentine, small arms fire, and anti-tank obstacles. On 20 September, the tanks of the Soviet 27th Light Tank Brigade of the 15th Tank Corps reached the city's outskirts. Although both numerically and technically superior, the Soviet forces lacked infantry support and oil, which stopped many tanks. Also, the tank crews had no experience in urban warfare, which was a significant help for the defenders.

The Soviets tried to seize the city from the south through the bridge over the Niemen River. However, the initial assault was repelled. In the early morning of 21 September, the defenders were joined by the remnants of the reserve Wołkowysk Cavalry Brigade under Brigadier General Wacław Przeździecki. After two days of heavy fighting, often in close quarters, much of the city centre was destroyed by Soviet artillery. Seeing no chance for further defence, on 22 September the remainder of the Polish forces withdrew towards the Lithuanian border. According to Soviet sources, the Red Army suffered casualties of 57 killed and 159 wounded. However, Polish historians Andrzej Krzysztof Kunert and Zygmunt Walkowski claim that the Red Army lost around 800 killed, missing or wounded. They also lost 19 tanks and four armored cars.

Polish losses, both civilian and military, remain unknown, although Soviet records claim 644 killed and 1,543 captured (66 officers and 1,477 soldiers). The Soviet troops reported the capture of 514 guns, 146 machine guns, a mortar, and an anti-aircraft gun.

One notable casualty on Polish side was 15-year-old Tadeusz Jasiński who was captured throwing a petrol bomb and tied to a Soviet tank as a human shield.

== Aftermath ==
After the battle, the remaining forces of the Wołkowysk Cavalry Brigade broke through the lines of the reconnaissance battalion of the 2nd Light Tank Brigade in the Battle of Kodziowce and headed for the Augustów Forest.

About 300 Polish defenders of the city, including teenage boys, were murdered by the Soviets after the battle.

The victims were both Polish students (20) and soldiers (30) as well as an unknown number of civilians. Poles were judged by the Soviet justice organs for their participation in the city's defense, reproached for armed resistance against the Red Army and sentenced.

== See also ==
- List of World War II military equipment of Poland
- List of Soviet Union military equipment of World War II
