= Stefan Dąb-Biernacki =

Polish general

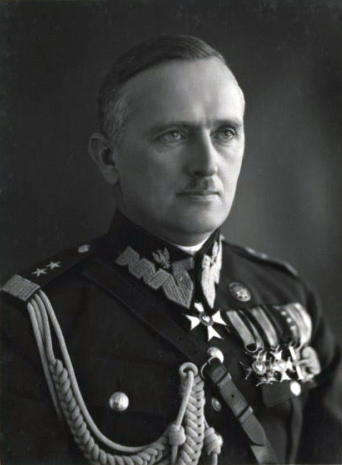
- Stefan Dąb-Biernacki
- Born: 7 January 1890; Gnojno, Russian Empire
- Died: 9 February 1959 (aged 69) London, England
- Allegiance: Second Polish Republic (1918–1939)
- Branch: Polish Legions; Polish Armed Forces
- Service years: 1914–1918 (Polish Legions); 1918–1940 (Polish Army)
- Rank: Private; Major general (before degradation)
- Conflicts: World War I Polish–Soviet War; World War II
- Awards: Officer's badge "Parasol" Knight's Cross of the Order of Virtuti Militari Gold Cross of Virtuti Militari Silver Cross of Virtuti Militari Commander's Cross with Star of the Order of Polonia Restituta Commander's Cross of the Order of Polonia Restituta Cross of Independence Cross of Valour Gold Cross of Merit Medal of 10 year anniversary of Independence Medal Commemorating 1918-1921 Chevalier of the Legion of Honour (France) Order of the White Eagle (Serbia) Order of Lāčplēsis (Latvia)

Stefan Dąb-Biernacki (7 January 1890 – 9 February 1959) was a general of the army during the Second Polish Republic. He served as a major general in the Polish Army in overall command of strategic reserve Army "Prusy" during the 1939 German Invasion of Poland.

== Early career ==
He was a member of the Polish Legions in World War I, and he later fought in the Polish-Soviet War commanding various regiments and the 1st Legions Infantry Division. He became distinguished during the retreat from Ukraine during the Polish–Ukrainian War, and in 1920 during Battle of Warsaw and Battle of the Niemen River, after which he received the Virtuti Militari medal.

He served as commander of 1st Legions Infantry Division until 1926, and worked with GISZ until 1930, thereafter serving as an Inspector general.

== World War II ==
During the invasion of Poland in 1939, General Biernacki commanded the Army "Prusy", which was supposed to be the strategic reserve that would be used to launch a concentrated counter-attack as the enemy approached Warsaw. However, Army "Prusy" was far from concentrated or ready for action on 1 September. He actually commanded a part of the army consisting of 3 infantry divisions (19, 29, 13) and one cavalry brigade (Wileńska Cavalry Brigade). He made an attempt to stop the German XVI Army Corps that had broken through the front near Częstochowa and pushed towards Warsaw. After Battle of Piotrków and Battle of Tomaszów Mazowiecki his forces were broken and scattered, he gave the orders to retreat to the right bank of the Vistula river. On 10 September he become commander of Northern Front, consisting of the remaining fragments of Polish Army. After his defeat at Battle of Tomaszów Lubelski, he managed to evacuate to France through Hungary, where he was immediately arrested by order of the Commander-in-Chief General Wladyslaw Sikorski for political reasons. In October 1940 he was sentenced to two and a half years in prison and demoted to the rank of private for "breaking military discipline and attempting to cause ferment in the ranks of soldiers". In November 1940 he was discharged from the army. When General Kazimierz Sosnkowski took over the position of Commander-in-Chief in 1943, Dąb-Biernacki was released from prison and went to Ireland, where he was engaged in beekeeping.

== Honours and awards ==
- Knight's Cross of the Order of Virtuti Militari (previously awarded the Gold Cross and Silver Cross)
- Commander's Cross of the Order of Polonia Restituta
- Cross of Independence
- Cross of Valour (four times)
- Gold Cross of Merit
- Chevalier of the Legion of Honour (France)
- Order of Lāčplēsis (Latvia)
- Order of the White Eagle (Serbia)
- Officer's badge "Parasol"
