= Władysław Kaliński =

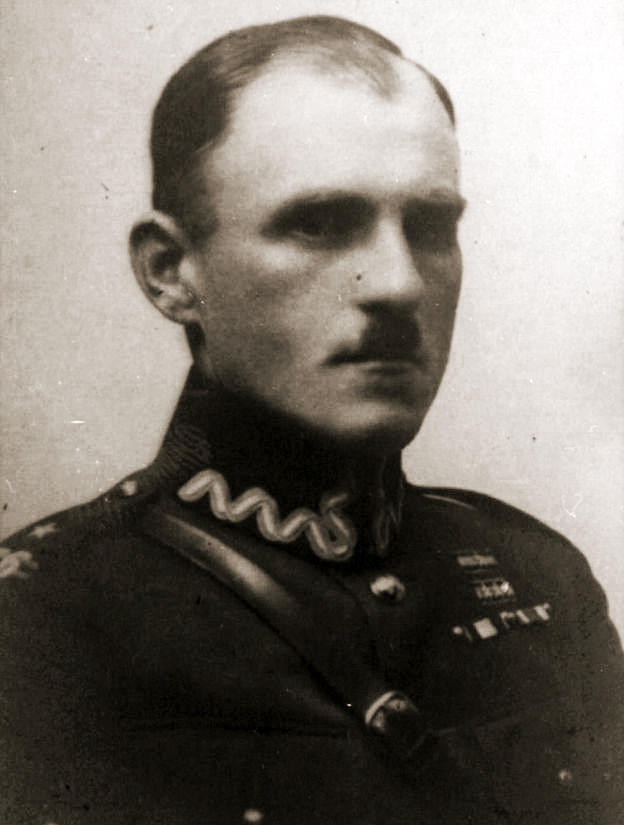
- Born: March 22, 1891; Rohatyn, Galicia and Lodomeria, Austria-Hungary
- Died: August 13, 1952 (aged 61); London, City of London, United Kingdom
- Other name: Zubosz
- Alma mater: Wyższa Szkoła Wojenna
- Military career
- Allegiance: Austria-Hungary; Poland
- Branch: Polish Legions; Polish Armed Forces
- Service years: 1914 – 1945
- Rank: Chartered Infantry Colonel
- Commands: 13th Infantry Division
- Conflicts: World War I Polish–Soviet War; World War II: 4–10 September campaign; Battle of Tomaszów Mazowiecki; Northern Front; Siege of Warsaw

Władysław Kaliński (pseudonym Zubosz) was a Polish Chartered Infantry Colonel who commanded the 13th Infantry Division during World War II and led the Battle of Tomaszów Mazowiecki before being captured after the fall of Warsaw.

== Biography ==
He was born on March 22, 1891, in Rohatyn, the then poviat town of the Kingdom of Galicia and Lodomeria, in the family of Jan and Katarzyna née Szwed. He passed his secondary school-leaving examination in 1912. During World War I, on August 3, 1914, he joined the Polish Legions, where he served until July 1917. He was promoted successively to the rank of ensign on November 1, 1916, and second lieutenant on January 1, 1917. In September 1917, after the Oath crisis, as an Austrian citizen, he was incorporated into the Austro-Hungarian Army and served in it until August 1918.

In November 1918 he was admitted to the Polish Armed Forces with the rank of lieutenant. He took part in the Polish–Soviet War. He was then a company commander in the 5th Legions' Infantry Regiment from November 1918 to December 7, 1919, the staff adjutant of the 1st Legions' Infantry Regiment from December 7, 1919, to July 9, 1920, and the commander of the 1st Warsaw Infantry Regiment from August 8, 1920, to September 19, 1920. In 1919 he was promoted to the rank of captain. He was given the rank of major of the infantry and in the group of officers of the former Polish Legions.

After the end of the conflict, he was the head of the Training Department in the First Department of Primary Weapons of the Ministry of Military Affairs from September 19, 1920 - July 21, 1922, and the battalion commander in the 36th Infantry Regiment of the Academic Legion from July 21, 1922, to November 30, 1922.

From November 30, 1922, to October 1, 1924, he was a student of the Normal Course at the Wyższa Szkoła Wojenna in Warsaw. On October 1, 1924, after completing the course and obtaining the academic title of an officer of the General Staff, he was assigned to the Closed War Council Office for the position of the head of the training department. On December 1, 1924, the President of the Republic of Poland, Stanisław Wojciechowski, at the request of the Minister of Military Affairs, Major General Władysław Sikorski, promoted him to the rank of lieutenant-colonel with seniority on August 15, 1924, and 97th position in the corps of infantry officers. On March 3, 1926, he was transferred to the 3rd Division of the Polish General Staff to the position of the head of the "Cover" section.

On June 25, 1927, he was transferred to the Border Protection Corps to the position of the commander of the 3rd Border Protection Half-Brigade in Podświl, and later in Berezwecz. In 1929, the unit he commanded was transformed into the KOP "Głębokie" Regiment. On October 23, 1931, he was transferred from the KOP to the 48th Infantry Regiment of Borderlands Rifles in Stanisławów to the position of the regiment commander. On December 10, 1931, he was promoted to the rank of colonel with seniority on January 1, 1932, and ranked 6th in the corps of infantry officers. In 1936 he became the commander of the infantry division of the 14th Infantry Division in Poznań.

In 1939, he became the commander of the 13th Infantry Division and he commanded this division during the Invasion of Poland, initially as a part of the Prusy Army. After the army was broken up by the Germans, he made his way to Warsaw with some of his troops. Here he received an order from the commander of the "Warsaw" Army to recreate the 13th Infantry Division from the remaining parts of the broken divisions of the 13th, 19th Infantry, 29th Infantry Divisions and the Workers' Defense Brigade of Warsaw. After the fall of Warsaw, he was taken prisoner by the Germans. He spent the war in Oflag VII-A Murnau. After being liberated in April 1945 from a POW camp by the United States Army, he left for the United Kingdom and lived in London, where he lived until his death.

== Awards ==
- Virtuti Militari, Silver Cross (No. 7072 - May 17, 1922)
- Cross of Independence (May 24, 1932 "for work in the work of regaining independence")
- Order of Polonia Restituta, Officer's Cross (November 10, 1928 "for merits in the field of organization of the army and independence work")
- Cross of Valour (Awarded 4 times)
- Cross of Merit, Golden cross (March 19, 1937 "for merits in military service")
