= Wacław Przeździecki =

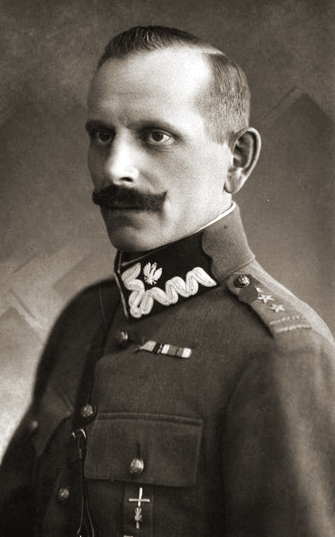
- Colonel Wacław Przeździecki
- Born: 15 July 1883; Leśmierz, Congress Poland
- Died: 29 June 1964 (aged 80); Penley, Wales
- Military career
- Allegiance: Second Polish Republic (1918–1939)
- Branch: Polish Legions; Polish Armed Forces
- Service years: 1918–1936; 1939–1947
- Rank: Generał brygady (Brigadier general)
- Unit: 21st Mountain Infantry Division
- Commands: Division commander
- Conflicts: World War I Polish–Soviet War; World War II
- Awards

Wacław Jan Przeździecki (Polish pronunciation: [ˈvat͡swaf pʂɛʑˈd͡ʑɛt͡skʲi]; 15 July 1883 – 29 June 1964) was a Polish military commander and Brigadier General of the Polish Army. During the Invasion of Poland in 1939, he was the commanding officer of the reserve Wołkowysk Cavalry Brigade that fought in the battle of Grodno.

Wacław Jan Przeździecki was born on 15 July 1883 in Leśmierz near Łęczyca to a family of old Polish gentry of Pierzchała Coat of Arms, deprived of all their property by the Russian authorities after the January Uprising. In 1903 he graduated from the Higher Trade School in Łódź, after which he joined the Technological Institute in Kharkiv (modern Ukraine). In 1904 he was relegated from the institute for being a member of a secret Polish resistance organisation. The only school to accept him was a military college in Kazan, from which he graduated in 1906. Przeździecki then joined the Imperial Russian Army and served as an adjutant in the officers school and the 260th Infantry Regiment stationed in Batum.

In 1913 he was promoted to the rank of Captain. During the First World War he served with distinction in the first line as the company and then battalion commander. After receiving a heavy wound in East Prussia, he was declared ineligible for service and dismissed. After the February Revolution he joined various Polish organisations in Russia, including the Chief Polish Military Committee (NPKW), and fought in the ranks of the 1st Polish Corps during the Russian Civil War. In 1918 he returned to Poland and joined the renascent Polish Army. As the commanding officer of the Polish 12th Infantry Division he fought in the Polish-Bolshevik War. After the Peace of Riga he remained in service at various staff posts. In 1926 he became the commanding officer of the Polish 21st Mountain Infantry Division and the following year he was promoted to the rank of Brigadier General. Retired in 1936, he settled in a small villa in Natolin, several kilometres to the south of Warsaw.

During the Invasion of Poland in 1939, he returned to active service and took part in formation of various reserve and improvised units for the German and then Soviet fronts. As the commanding officer of the Wołkowysk Cavalry Brigade he took part in the battle of Grodno, one of the most important Polish-Soviet battles of the war. After the battle he crossed the border with Lithuania, where he was interned with his soldiers. In 1940 however, after the Baltic States were annexed by the Soviet Union he was arrested by the NKVD and sent to the Kozielsk camp. Soon afterwards he was transferred to Lubyanka prison, where he was offered to lead a Polish division created as an ally of the Soviet Union. When he refused and relied his reaction on the decision of the Polish Government in Exile, he was transferred to a special NKVD detention centre in Gryazovets.

After the Sikorski-Mayski Agreement he was released from the prison and allowed to join the Polish II Corps, with which he moved to Persia, Iraq and finally to Palestine. There he was judged (at age 58) to be too elderly for active service. After the war he remained in Palestine, and in 1947 moved to Great Britain, where he was given a role at the Polish Hospital in Penley, Wales. Wacław Przeździecki died there on 29 June 1964, aged 80.

== Awards and decorations ==
- Silver Cross of Virtuti Militari (1922)
- Commander's Cross of the Order of Polonia Restituta (18 November 1928)
- Cross of Independence (2 May 1933)
- Cross of Valour (three times)
- Gold Cross of Merit (19 March 1931)
- Commemorative Medal for the War of 1918–1921
- Medal of the 10th Anniversary of Regained Independence
- Bronze Medal for Long Service
- Chevalier of Legion of Honour (France)
- Victory Medal (14 January 1925)
