= Battle of Tomaszów Mazowiecki =

Coordinates: 51°32′00″N 20°01′00″E

- Part of Invasion of Poland
| Date | 6 September 1939 |
| Location | Near Tomaszów Mazowiecki, Łódź Voivodeship, Poland |
| Result | German victory |

Belligerents
| Germany | Poland |

Commanders and leaders
| (Nazi Germany) Erich Hoepner | (Second Polish Republic) Władysław Kaliński |

Strength
| Two Panzer Divisions of the XVI Panzer Corps | 13th Infantry Division |

Casualties and losses
| 100 killed 21 tanks destroyed | 770 killed 1023 wounded |

The battle of Tomaszów Mazowiecki (Polish: Bitwa pod Tomaszowem Mazowieckim) was fought on 6 September 1939 near the town of Tomaszów Mazowiecki, Second Polish Republic, during the invasion of Poland.

The area was defended by Polish 13th Infantry Division under Col. Władysław Kaliński, and Germany's assault was carried by two armored divisions of the 16th Panzer Corps. After the day-long battle, German forces broke through the Polish defences and took the town. The Polish 13th Division sustained heavy losses and was forced to retreat towards Warsaw.

== See also ==
- List of World War II military equipment of Poland
- List of German military equipment of World War II
