= Maciej Kaliński =

Polish lawyer and academic (b. 1974)

- Born: May 9, 1974 (age 51); Warsaw
- Title: Associate Professor

Academic background
- Education: Doctor of historical sciences in law
- Alma mater: University of Warsaw

Academic work
- Discipline: Civil law

Maciej Jacek Kaliński (born May 9, 1974 in Warsaw) is a Polish lawyer and associate professor at the University of Warsaw, specializing in civil law.

== Early life ==
Kaliński graduated from the T. Reytan Secondary School in Warsaw.

== Education ==
In 1997, Kaliński graduated with honors from the Faculty of Law and Administration of the University of Warsaw. In 2000, Kaliński completed his doctoral studies from University of Warsaw. Kaliński received a doctoral degree of legal sciences in 2009, for his scientific achievements and a thesis entitled "Damage to the Law and Administration of the University of Warsaw".

In 2009, for his thesis 'Damage to property and its remediation', he was awarded the degree of habilitation of legal sciences in the field of law, specialisation: civil law.

== Career ==
Kaliński became an associate professor at the University of Warsaw and head of the Department of Civil Law at the Faculty of Law and Administration of that University. In 2010 he became a member of the Legislative Council, and in 2011 he became the Vice-President of the Legislative Council in Warsaw.
