= Józef Olszyna-Wilczyński =

Polish general (1890–1939)

General Józef Olszyna-Wilczyński
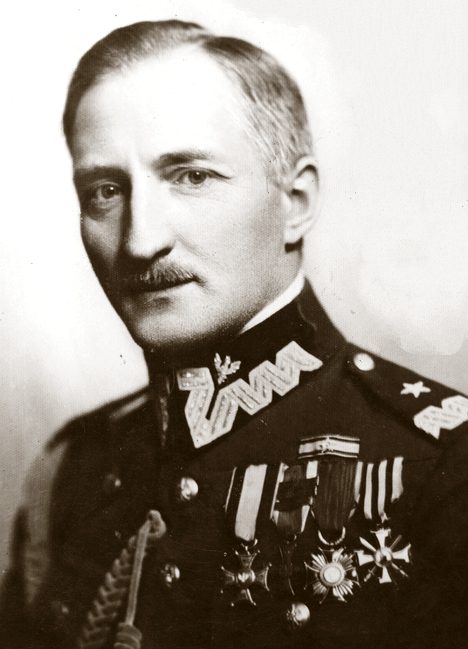
- Józef Olszyna-Wilczyński
- Born: 27 November 1890; Kraków, Austria-Hungary
- Died: 22 September 1939 (aged 48); Sopoćkinie, Augustów County, Białystok Voivodeship, Poland
- Military career
- Allegiance: Second Polish Republic (1918–1939)
- Branch: Polish Legions; Polish Armed Forces
- Service years: 1914–1918 (Austria-Hungary); 1918–1939 (Poland)
- Rank: Brigadier general
- Conflicts: World War I Polish–Ukrainian War; Polish-Soviet War; World War II

Józef Konstanty Olszyna-Wilczyński (pronounced [ˈjuzɛf ɔlˈʂɨna vilˈt͡ʂɨj̃skʲi]; 27 November 1890 – 22 September 1939) was a Polish general and one of the high-ranking commanders of the Polish Army. A veteran of World War I, the Polish-Ukrainian War and the Polish-Soviet War, he was executed by the Soviets during the Invasion of Poland of 1939.

== Early life ==
Józef Wilczyński was born 27 November 1890 in Kraków (Cracow). In 1910 he graduated from the St. Anne's gymnasium in Kraków in Austro-Hungarian Galicia and started his studies at the architectural department of the Lwów University of Science and Technology. During his studies, between 1912 and 1913 he also received military training in Kraków and Lwów, after which he joined the Drużyny Strzeleckie, where he also worked as a tutor of infantry tactics. About that time he adopted the Olszyna nom de guerre, which later became part of his surname.

== First World War ==
After the outbreak of the Great War he was mobilized to the Austro-Hungarian Army in the role of a platoon commanding officer, but on 6 August 1914 he was allowed to join the Polish Legions.

He served with distinction in the rank of Second Lieutenant and then First Lieutenant in most of the battles of the 1st Brigade of the Polish Legions. Initially a company commander in the 1st Regiment, in 1915 he was promoted to the rank of Captain and became a battalion commander within the 5th Regiment. After the Oath Crisis of 1917, as an Austro-Hungarian citizen, Olszyna-Wilczyński was drafted into the Austro-Hungarian Army and dispatched to the Italian Front, along with many of his colleagues. He commanded infantry platoons within 50th, 62nd and 59th platoons, after which he was transferred to Ukraine as a commander of the 3rd battalion of the 16th Regiment. There, he organized a cell of the Polish Military Organization.

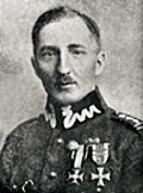
Józef Olszyna-Wilczyński

After Poland regained its independence, on 4 November 1918, Olszyna-Wilczyński and his battalion (composed of Poles mostly) joined the Polish Army. An experienced officer, he was attached to the ad hoc formation of Col. Czesław Rybiński fighting in Volhynia during the Polish-Ukrainian War. On 27 November his company was defeated in a skirmish near Mikulińce near Tarnopol and Olszyna-Wilczyński himself was heavily wounded and taken prisoner of war by the Ukrainians. It was not until their defeat in June 1919 that he was released and allowed to return to the Polish Army. Promoted to Lieutenant Colonel, he became the commanding officer of the 3rd Polish Legions Infantry Brigade, and then (since 28 September 1919) the 1st Polish Legions Infantry Brigade. With the latter unit he took part in the Polish-Soviet War.

During the Kiev offensive in 1920 he briefly returned to the 3rd Brigade and briefly served as the military commander of Kievan military garrison. During the Polish withdrawal he commanded a number of units, including the 6th Infantry Division, an Operational Group within Wacław Iwaszkiewicz's 6th Army, 14th Infantry Brigade, and then the 13th Infantry Brigade. After the battle of Warsaw he was promoted to the rank of Colonel. After the war he was withdrawn to the rear and, together with his unit, was responsible for shielding the border with Germany in the area of Zagłębie during the Third Silesian Uprising. A skilled organizer rather than front-line commander, between 1922 and 1923 Józef Olszyna-Wilczyński headed the engineering units of the Kraków-based 5th Military Area Command (DOK V). Then, until October 1924 he served as the head of all the engineering units of the Polish Army in the Polish Ministry of Military Affairs.

After the creation of the Border Defence Corps (KOP), on 10 October 1924 he became the commanding officer of the 2nd Brigade of that force, based in Baranowicze. The following year he was transferred to the same post in the 1st Brigade of the KOP based in Zdołbunów. Sent to the Higher War School in Warsaw, on 19 March 1927 he was promoted to the rank of brigadier general and became the commanding officer of the 10th Infantry Division. Promoter of order, cleanness and mustering, he was generally disliked by his subordinates. At the same time he proved to be a skilled organizer and an outstanding rear-line commander. Because of that between 1935 and 1937 he served as director of Państwowy Urząd Wychowania Fizycznego i Przysposobienia Wojskowego (The National Office of Physical Education and Military Training) and then in January 1938, he was made the commander of the Grodno-based 3rd Military Area Command (DOK III). Soon before the outbreak of the Polish Defensive War the DOK III was converted into the Grodno Operational Group.

== Second World War ==
After the outbreak of the war, Olszyna-Wilczyński's unit was to prepare the defense of the area between Biebrza River, Suwałki, and Wizna. However, due to German breakthrough in Lesser Poland the Operational Group was disbanded and its units withdrawn to Lwów, where they later took part in the battle for that city. Olszyna-Wilczyński himself escorted his units to Pińsk, where he met with Marshal of Poland Edward Rydz-Śmigły. After the Soviet Union invaded Poland on 17 September, the Polish government issued orders to its military that they should avoid fighting with Soviet forces. Nonetheless both pro-Communist rebels (Skidel revolt) and various Soviet units did not shy away from attacking Polish units.

The Soviet offensive caught much of the eastern Poland virtually undefended, as most of the Polish forces from the area had already been transferred to the German front. After breaking through overstretched defenses of the Border Defence Corps, the Soviet 15th Armored Corps started a fast advance towards the city of Grodno. Commander of the prewar Grodno Military Area Command, Gen. Józef Olszyna-Wilczyński together with the mayor of Grodno Roman Sawicki began organizing city defenses, basing mostly on march battalions, volunteers, Boy Scouts and police forces.

Ill-equipped, undermanned and lacking any anti-tank artillery, the Polish defenders relied mostly on improvised anti-tank defences, such as bottles of gasoline or turpentine and anti-tank obstacles. On September twenty the Soviet tanks reached the city's outskirts. After two days of heavy fights, often in close quarters, much of the city centre was destroyed by Soviet artillery. Seeing no chance for further defense, on 22 September the remainder of the Polish forces withdrew towards the Lithuanian border. General Olszyna-Wilczyński's car, in which he traveled with his family and adjutant captain Mieczysław Strzemeski were stopped by a tank-artillery group under command of Maj. Chuvakin on 22 September near Sopoćkinie. The general and his adjutant were shot after a brief interrogation, while his wife and driver were allowed to continue the journey.

== 2002 Polish investigation ==
On 11 February 2002 the Polish Institute of National Remembrance started an enquiry and investigation on the murder of Gen. Wilczyński and Capt. Strzemeski (signature akt S 6/02/Zk). In the course of the inquiry in Polish and former Soviet archives, the exact unit responsible for their capture, interrogation and murder was identified. Consequently, on 26 September 2003 the Russian Military Prosecutor's Office was asked to investigate the matter on the basis of the IV Hague Convention on Laws and Customs of War on Land of 18 October 1907. The war crimes against the convention are not liable for expiration or non-claim. However, the Russian office returned the Polish application stating that the soldiers and officers of the Red Army committed a common crime rather than a war crime, and as such their crimes were subject to expiration. Because of that, on 18 May 2004 the investigation was closed due to inability to find those responsible.

== Awards ==
- Virtuti Militari, Silver Cross
- Polonia Restituta
- Cross of Independence
- Cross of Valour – 4 times
- Cross of Merit, Golden Cross
- Officers' badge "Parasol"
- Military Merit Cross, 3rd class (Austria-Hungary)
- Légion d'honneur, Knight rank (France)
- Order of Lāčplēsis, 3rd class (Latvia)
- and others

== See also ==
- Battle of Grodno (1939)
