= 36th Infantry Division (Poland) =

World War II Polish Army division

36th Reserve Infantry Division
- 36 Rezerwowa Dywizja Piechoty
- Active: 1939
- Country: Poland
- Branch: Army
- Type: Infantry
- Part of: Prusy Army
- Garrison/HQ: Przysucha
- Engagements: September Campaign

Commanders
- Commander: Col. Bolesław Andrzej Ostrowski

The 36th Reserve Infantry Division (36 Rezerwowa Dywizja Piechoty) was a unit of the Polish Army in the interbellum period, which took part in the Polish September Campaign.

It was formed out of several brigades of the Border Defence Corps of the Podolia region, which had guarded southeastern border of Poland (see: Kresy). In the first days of September 1939, under Colonel Boleslaw Ostrowski, the Division was concentrated in the area of Szydłowiec, as part of the Prusy Army. Facing the Poles was the Second Armored Division of the Wehrmacht, whose units attacked Przedborz on September 3 and after heavy fights managed to capture the town.

On September 6, the German First Light Division crossed the Pilica River in Przedborz, which forced the Poles to withdraw towards Skarżysko-Kamienna. At the same time, Polish divisions on the right wing of the Prusy Army were destroyed and the 36th I.D. retreated to Końskie. In the morning of September 7, the Germans attacked Polish positions near Kazanów, and in the battle Polish regiments lost up to 40% of KIA, MIA and wounded.

On September 8, Colonel Ostrowski, after finding out that the Germans had captured Skarżysko-Kamienna, decided to move northwards, to Szydłowiec. However, on the same day the Germans attacked at noon. The marching Division was split and its units were separated. Ostrowski himself got to Kozienice and later crossed the Vistula. Meanwhile, the Germans attacked Polish units in the nearby forests of the Holy Cross Mountains, with heavy losses of both sides. On September 9, remaining parts of the 36th I.D. reached Iłża and then headed towards the Vistula. However, the Germans had already been on the western bank of the river. Under the circumstances, the Poles split into smaller groups and crossed the river, joining the Lublin Army. This was the end of the 36th I.D.

== Structure ==
Headquarters of the 36th was based on the Border Defence Corps Brigade Podole.

- 163rd Infantry Regiment, based on Border Defence Corps Brigades Czortków, Borszczow, Skalat and Turylcze,
- 164th Infantry Regiment, was based on parts of the 38th Infantry Regiment from Przemyśl, with additional units from Stanisławów and Stryj,
- 165th Infantry Regiment, was based on parts of the 17th Infantry Regiment from Rzeszów and the Border Defence Corps Brigade Kopczynce
- 40th Light Artillery Regiment was based on the 24th Light Artillery Regiment from Jarosław as well as units from Czortków and Przemyśl.

== See also ==
- Polish army order of battle in 1939
- Polish contribution to World War II
- List of Polish divisions in World War II
