= Prussian Army (Polish Armed Forces) =

Now-defunct Polish Military Unit during World War 2

The Prusy Army (Polish: Armia Prusy) was one of the Polish armies to fight during the Invasion of Poland in 1939. Created in the summer of 1939 as the main reserve of the Commander in Chief, it was commanded by Gen. Stefan Dąb-Biernacki. The word Prusy in the Polish language means Prussia, but this name only served as a codename and the region of operations of this army was far from East Prussia. This is in contrast to other Polish armies in 1939 which were named after the geographical regions where they formed. The Prusy Army, whose original name was Warszawa Army, was named so after a folwark in central Poland called Prusy, which served as the headquarters of General Dąb-Biernacki.

== Tasks ==
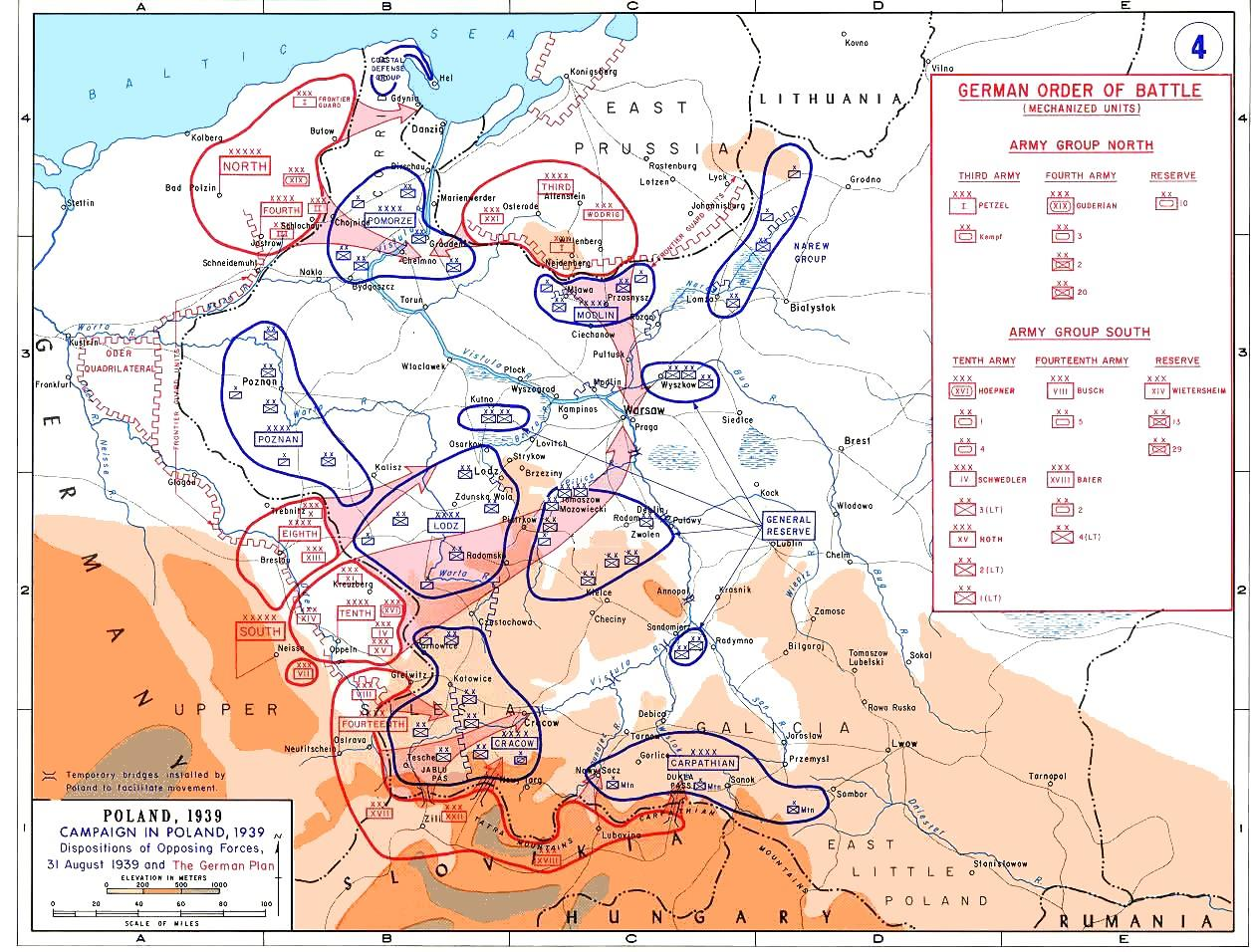
Forces as of 31 August and German plan of attack.

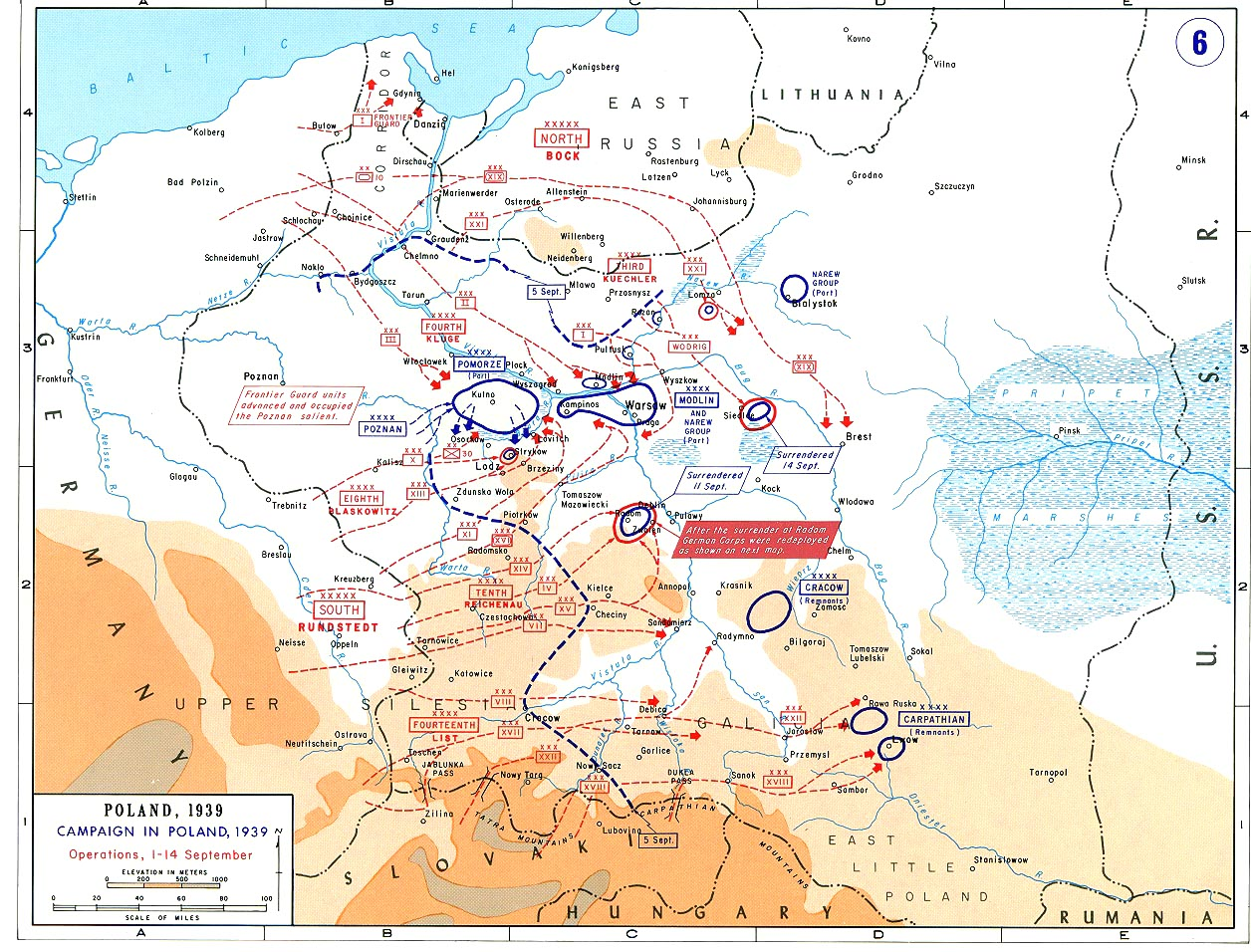
Forces as of 14 September with troop movements up to this date.

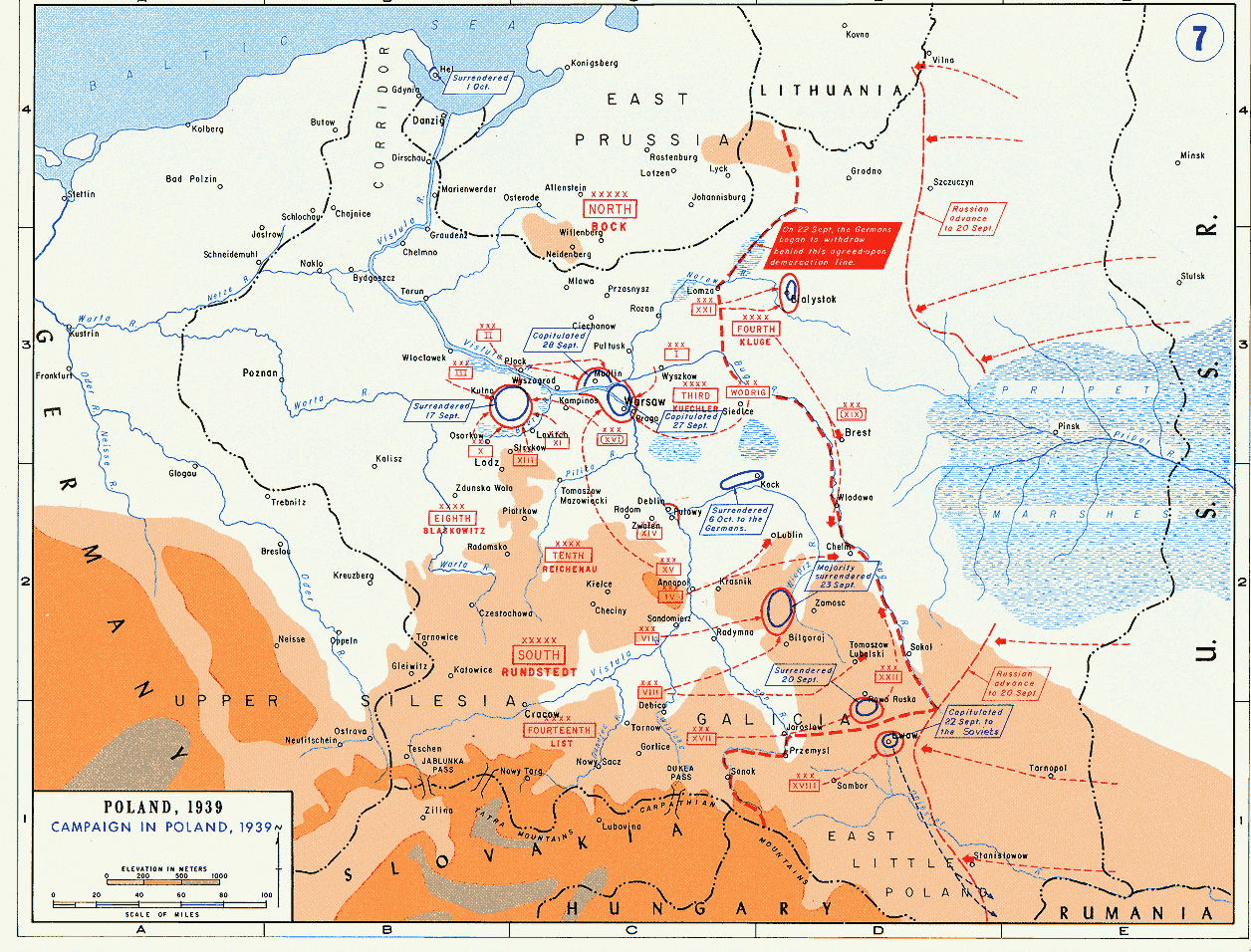
Forces after 14 September with troop movements after this date

According to the "Plan West" (Plan Zachód, the code name for the Polish mobilization plan) it was to be composed of units mobilized as the second and third waves, and its main purpose was to cooperate with the nearby armies "Łódź" and "Kraków". It was being mobilized in two groups after the outbreak of hostilities. It consisted of 6 infantry divisions, 1 cavalry brigade and a battalion of tanks. Once ready, it was supposed to stop the main German thrust. The army, divided into two groups, northern and southern, was concentrated southwest of Warsaw (in the triangle between Kielce, Radom, and Tomaszów Mazowiecki), as Marshall Edward Śmigły-Rydz was convinced that main German thrust would be directed at Warsaw, via Łódź.

The Northern Group of the Prusy Army was planned to be concentrated in the area Koluszki-Łowicz-Skierniewice, while its southern group was located in the area marked by the towns of Skarżysko-Kamienna-Opoczno-Radom. After detraining, the units of the Army were to take positions in the following towns: 44th I.D. - Sochaczew, 13th I.D - Regny, 19th I.D. - Tomaszów Mazowiecki, Wilno Cavalry Brigade - Piotrków Trybunalski, 29th I.D. - Sulejów, 36th I.D. - Opoczno, 12th I.D. - Końskie, 3rd I.D. - Skarżysko-Kamienna, 39th I.D. - Kozienice.

Polish military strategists correctly predicted that German forces would try to push in between the armies "Łódź" and "Krakow," but they failed to predict the fast pace of the German advance. Therefore, in Polish plans "Armia Prusy" was to be fully mobilized only by 14 September 1939, while in reality, it needed to be ready as soon as the late night of 3 September 1939. As Polish historians Czesław Grzelak and Henryk Stańczyk wrote: "Polish planners miscalculated the speed of the advance of German panzer and motorized units, and plans for the conflict were based on the experiences of the First World War".

The Poles were surprised by how fast they would have to fall back to prevent the destruction of their units. This miscalculation led to the capture of the city of Łódź - a major setback to the Polish plan of defending the country west from the Vistula river at least until October 1939. More surprising should be that the "Polish schedule" was followed by the French one year later; they did refuse to read the report pointing out mistakes of the Polish military, and drawing conclusions on how to avoid them in the future. The report was prepared by the Polish generals and handed to the French, and the British in their respective languages, in late 1939.

== Operational history ==
The northern group was to back up the Łódź Army near Łódź and Sieradz, while the southern group was to support Kraków Army by preparing the defence of central Vistula river area. Because of fast German advance both groups entered combat separately and most units did not reach full mobilization. Due to the deteriorating situation in the battle of the border, it was decided to push partially mobilized units of Prusy Army to the front as soon as possible. In original Polish plans, the 10th Motorized Cavalry Brigade belonged to the Prusy Army. In late July 1939, Marshall Śmigły-Rydz decided to move this unit to Kraków Army.

The northern group, seriously damaged in the battles of Piotrków and Tomaszów Mazowiecki (September 5 - September 6) was forced to cross the Vistula. The southern group, much less organized and poorly commanded, fought in the Battle of Iłża, after which it was cut off from the Vistula, encircled near Radom and destroyed (September 8–9). Units of the Army which retained cohesion or broke through the German lines later fought in the defense of Warsaw or joined the other Armies in the northern-central Poland.

== Organization ==
The army was commanded by General Stefan Dąb-Biernacki; his chief of staff was Tomasz Obertyński. Biernacki was in direct command of the Northern Group; the Southern Group was commanded by General Stanisław Skwarczyński.

Unit	Polish name	Commander	Remarks
Army units - gen. Stefan Dąb-Biernacki
39th Infantry Division,	39 Dywizja Piechoty	col. Bruno Olbrycht	reserve
44th Infantry Division,	44 Dywizja Piechoty	col. Eugeniusz Żongołłowicz	reserve
Northern group - gen. Stefan Dąb-Biernacki
13th Infantry Division,	13 Dywizja Piechoty	col. Władysław Zubosz-Kaliński
19th Infantry Division	19 Dywizja Piechoty	gen. Józef Kwaciszewski
29th Infantry Division	29 Dywizja Piechoty	col. Ignacy Oziewicz
Wileńska Cavalry Brigade	Wileńska Brygada Kawalerii	col. Konstanty Drucki-Lubecki
1st tank battalion	1 battalion czołgów
Southern group - gen. Stanisław Skwarczyński
3rd Legions Infantry Division	3 Dywizja Piechoty Legionów	col. Marian Turowski
12th Infantry Division	12 Dywizja Piechoty	gen. Gustaw Paszkiewicz
36th Infantry Division	36 Dywizja Piechoty	col. Michał Ostrowski	reserve
