= 13th Infantry Division (Poland) =

13th Kresy Infantry Division (Polish: 13 Kresowa Dywizja Piechoty French: 13e Division d'Infanterie de Kresy) was a unit of the Polish Army in the interbellum period. It was named after Kresy. Its origins go back to the World War I, when in June 1918 the 1st Division of Polish Rifles (1 Dywizja Strzelców Polskich, 1re Division de Fusils Polonais) was formed in the French town of Villers-Marmery. On July 8, 1918, the Division consisted of 227 officers and 10.000 soldiers, and it had been planned to be used in French attack on the German town of Saarbrücken, in the fall of 1918. Armistice, signed in November 1918, changed those plans.

On September 9, 1919, the unit, after having been transformed to Poland, was renamed by Józef Piłsudski into 13th Infantry Division. Soon afterwards, it took part in the Polish-Soviet War, after which it was garrisoned in Rowne and other Volhynian towns, such as Dubno, Brody, Lutsk and Wlodzimierz Wolynski.

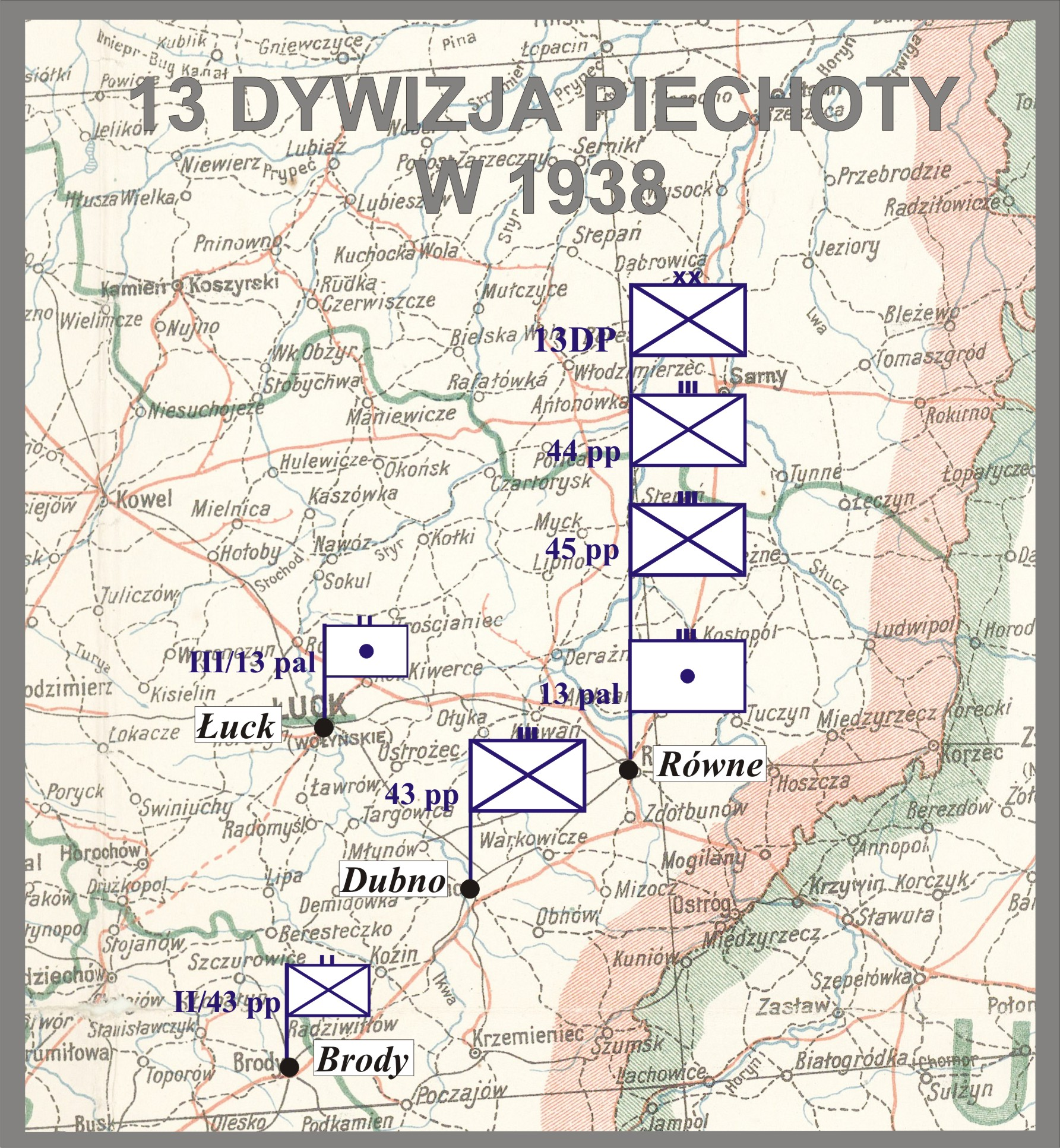
13 DP w 1938

== Invasion of Poland ==
The Division, under Colonel Władysław Kaliński, was mobilised on August 14 and 15, 1939. A few days later it was transported by rail to the area of Bydgoszcz, where it became part of the Prusy Army and was transferred south, near the central Poland's rail junction of Koluszki. There, it remained as a rear unit, the last Polish division defending access to Warsaw. On September 6–7 it was engaged in bitter fights with German XVI Armored Corps of General Erich Hoepner. With help from Luftwaffe, units of the German 4th Armored Division managed to break through Polish positions and capture Tomaszów Mazowiecki. During the night of September 7–8, most of the soldiers of the 13th Infantry Division panicked and deserted, those who remained, managed to cross the Vistula on September 11.

On the eastern shore of the river, the Division's remnants were recreated by Colonel Waclaw Szalewicz and renamed as the 13th Infantry Brigade. This unit fought German 7th Infantry Division near Przemyśl and Jarosław. The 2000 soldiers of the recreated division that remained in central Poland tried to fight their way towards besieged Warsaw, but were stopped by the Wehrmacht during a night battle in Falenica, a suburb of Warsaw, on September 19, 1939. Only 150 soldiers of the division were able to reach the capital of Poland, before it capitulated.

== See also ==
- Polish army order of battle in 1939
- Polish contribution to World War II
- List of Polish divisions in World War II
