= Wilno Cavalry Brigade =

Unit of the Polish Army

The Wilno Cavalry Brigade (Polish: Wileńska Brygada Kawalerii) was a unit of the Polish Army, created on 1 April 1937 out of the 3rd Independent Cavalry Brigade. Its headquarters were stationed in Wilno (Vilnius), with some regiments garrisoned in the neighboring towns. In late 1930s it consisted of these units:

- 4th Niemen Uhlan Regiment, stationed in Wilno
- 13th Wilno Uhlan Regiment, stationed in Nowa Wilejka
- 23rd Grodno Uhlan Regiment, stationed in Postawy
- 3rd Mounted Artillery Regiment, stationed in Podbrodzie
- 7th Pioneers Squadron, stationed in Wilno
- 3rd Communications Squadron, stationed in Wilno

== Polish September Campaign ==
The brigade, under Colonel Konstanty Drucki-Lubecki, was part of the Prusy Army and on the night of 31 August /1 September 1939, it unloaded from trains at stations of Rogów and Koluszki, near Łódź. In the following days, it defended Piotrków Trybunalski, then, together with other units, it crossed the Vistula.

On 8 September, the 4th Regiment of Niemen Uhlans was attacked by parts of the German 1st Light Division of General Friedrich-Wilhelm von Loeper. The Poles destroyed five tanks, but had to withdraw, due to the enemy's heavy pressure. Soon afterwards, the whole Brigade, losing its heavy equipment as a result of several skirmishes with the Wehrmacht, ceased to exist and got scattered. Several soldiers drowned in the Vistula, also the Poles left a lot of equipment on the eastern bank of the river.

At the same time, the 23rd Regiment of Grodno Uhlans was cut from the rest of the brigade and withdrew to the Swietokrzyskie Mountains. On 10 September, the brigade was planned to concentrate in a forest near Łaskarzew, but the only unit that showed up was the 4th Regiment of Niemen Uhlans. The Poles headed towards Lubartów, joining other units of the Prusy Army. Then it became part of the Operational Cavalry Group of General Władysław Anders and tried to break through to Hungary, after fighting in the Battle of Tomaszów Lubelski.

== See also ==
- Polish army order of battle in 1939
- Polish contribution to World War II
