= Battle of Władypol =

- Part of the Soviet Invasion of Poland in the European theatre of World War II
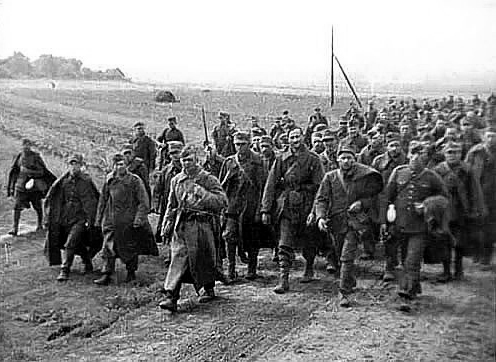
- Polish prisoners of war captured by the Red Army during the Soviet invasion of Poland in 1939
| Date | 27 September 1939 |
| Location | Władypol near Sambor, Lwów Voivodeship, Poland 49°39′N 23°10′E |
| Result | Soviet victory |

Belligerents
| Soviet Union | Poland |

Commanders and leaders
| Ivan Tyulenev | Władysław Anders |

Units involved
| (Soviet Union) 12th Army | (Second Polish Republic) Cavalry Operational Group; 26th Uhlans; 27th Uhlans |

Strength
| | c. 2,500 |

Casualties and losses
| Unknown | c. 20 killed, over 1,000 taken prisoner |

Battle of Władypol was an armed engagement between Poland and the Soviet Union during the Nazi German and Soviet invasion of Poland. It took place on 27 September 1939 near the town of Sambor. It was among the last cavalry battles of 1939 and one of the last large-scale battles in Central Poland. It was won by the Red Army.

== History ==
After the Battle of Tomaszów Lubelski General Władysław Anders' Cavalry Operational Group (Polish: Grupa Operacyjna Kawalerii) consisting of his own Nowogródzka Cavalry Brigade as well as two regiments (1st KOP Cavalry and 22nd Cavalry) of Kresowa Cavalry Brigade and other units was one of the very few Polish units to escape encirclement. General Anders decided to break through towards Hungary.

On 25 September General Anders' force reached the village of Wólka Horyniecka, already manned by a German garrison. Anders dispatched envoys to the German commander and the Germans allowed the Polish force to pass through unopposed towards Hungary in exchange for setting free German prisoners of war taken during the battle of Krasnobród, among them General Rudolf Koch-Erpach.

On 26 September 1939 Anders gathered his forces around Krakowiec, and ordered his cavalry to advance southwards, through Lubienie, Borów, Siedliska, Lipniki and Radenice. The unit moved unopposed as the German forces have already started their withdrawal towards the so-called "border of peace", or a Soviet-German demarcation line established in the Molotov–Ribbentrop Pact, thus leaving a narrow strip of unoccupied land. However, although the Polish unit was still a coherent force of some 2500 men, most of the soldiers have been on the front line for almost four weeks without rest. The Polish column moved all night; the commanders feared that if they allowed their men to dismount, they would fall asleep and it would be impossible to wake them back up. Overnight the column captured two Soviet lorries travelling towards Mościska, but their drivers did not disclose the location of the nearest Soviet units.

The following morning the Polish unit reached the Hill 292 right outside the village of Władypol, some 15 kilometres (9.3 mi) north of the city of Sambor and 120 kilometres (75 mi) from Hungarian border. The village has already been taken by advanced Soviet forces of Gen. Ivan Tyulenev's 12th Army. As there was officially no state of war between Poland and the Soviet Union, and the advancing Soviet troops often informed local populace that they entered Poland to help the Polish Army against the German invaders, Anders dispatched Capt. Kuczyński as an envoy to the Soviet commander, but the envoy was robbed of all his belongings by Soviet soldiers and barely escaped with his life. Soon after his return the Soviets attacked.

A meeting engagement ensued in which the Polish 26th Cavalry Regiment repelled the Soviet cavalry and tank units. Simultaneously a larger Soviet force appeared in the vicinity of Chliple (modern Khlipli), some 5.5 kilometres (3.4 mi) to the north-east. It was stopped by a combined force of 25th Cavalry and the 9th Mounter Artillery Regiment passing through the village of Wola Sudkowska, halfway between Chliple and Władypol. The Polish force captured Chliple and held out against the Soviets long enough for the rest of the column to pass further south, but Polish artillery exhausted all its ammunition and the guns had to be destroyed by their crews to prevent their use by the enemy.

The Polish force withdrew further south, towards the Błażenka Nowa stream, but the Soviets attacked once again between Władypol and the village of Rajtarowice, some 6 kilometres (3.7 mi) west. A combined cavalry and tank force composed of the entire 34th Cavalry Division and elements of 32nd Cavalry Division. The Poles withdrew westwards, to a large forest to the north of Rajtarowice.

Seeing no chances to defeat yet another Soviet unit, General Anders called up a war council in a forester's hut Jordanówka near Władypol and ordered his units disperse and try to break through the Soviet units on their own. The 26th Cavalry Regiment with Anders himself in charge was to man the forest for as long as possible to cover the withdrawal. However, in the chaotic withdrawal most Polish forces, roughly 1500 men, were taken prisoner of war by the Soviets.

Anders, by then wounded twice, withdrew together with a group of roughly 250 men. They broke through to the assembly point, but failed to recover contact with the remaining regiments. Surrounded by the Soviet forces once more on September 29, he dispersed his group onto groups of 10 and ordered his men to either return home or try to break through towards Hungary on their own. He was wounded for the third time soon afterwards and was captured by the Soviets. He was among the very few high-ranking Polish officers to survive the Katyn Massacre of the following year.

== Casualties ==
Early Polish sources cited overall Polish casualties as roughly 100 killed in action and twice as many wounded. However, it is possible that the actual casualties on the Polish side were much lower and did not exceed 20 killed. Soviet casualties are unknown, but were certainly higher, among the killed was Major Diegtariev, commanding officer of the Soviet 148th Cavalry Regiment.

== See also ==
- List of World War II military equipment of Poland
- List of Soviet Union military equipment of World War II
