= Hutki =

Hutki may refer to the following places:

- Hutki, Lesser Poland Voivodeship (south Poland)
- Hutki, Lublin Voivodeship (east Poland)
- Hutki, Podlaskie Voivodeship (north-east Poland)
- Hutki, Silesian Voivodeship (south Poland)

It may also refer to:

- Dried fish, also known as Shutki or Hutki
