= Majdan Mały =

- Village
- Location within Poland
- Coordinates: 50°32′N 23°18′E
- Country: Poland
- Voivodeship: Lublin
- County: Zamość
- Gmina: Krasnobród

Majdan Mały (Polish pronunciation: [ˈmajdan ˈmawɨ]) is a village in the administrative district of Gmina Krasnobród, within Zamość County, Lublin Voivodeship, in eastern Poland.
