= Stara Huta, Zamość County =

Stara Huta
- Village
- Location within Poland
- Coordinates: 50°33′N 23°4′E
- Country: Poland
- Voivodeship: Lublin
- County: Zamość
- Gmina: Krasnobród

Stara Huta [ˈstara ˈxuta] is a village in the administrative district of Gmina Krasnobród, within Zamość County, Lublin Voivodeship, in eastern Poland.
