= Hucisko, Lublin Voivodeship =

Hucisko
- Village
- Location within Poland
- Coordinates: 50°33′N 23°6′E
- Country: Poland
- Voivodeship: Lublin
- County: Zamość
- Gmina: Krasnobród
- Time zone: UTC+1 (CET)
  - Summer (DST): UTC+2 (CEST)

Hucisko [xuˈt͡ɕiskɔ] is a village in the administrative district of Gmina Krasnobród, within Zamość County, Lublin Voivodeship, in eastern Poland.

== History ==
10 Polish citizens were murdered by Nazi Germany in the village during World War II.
