= Krasnobród =

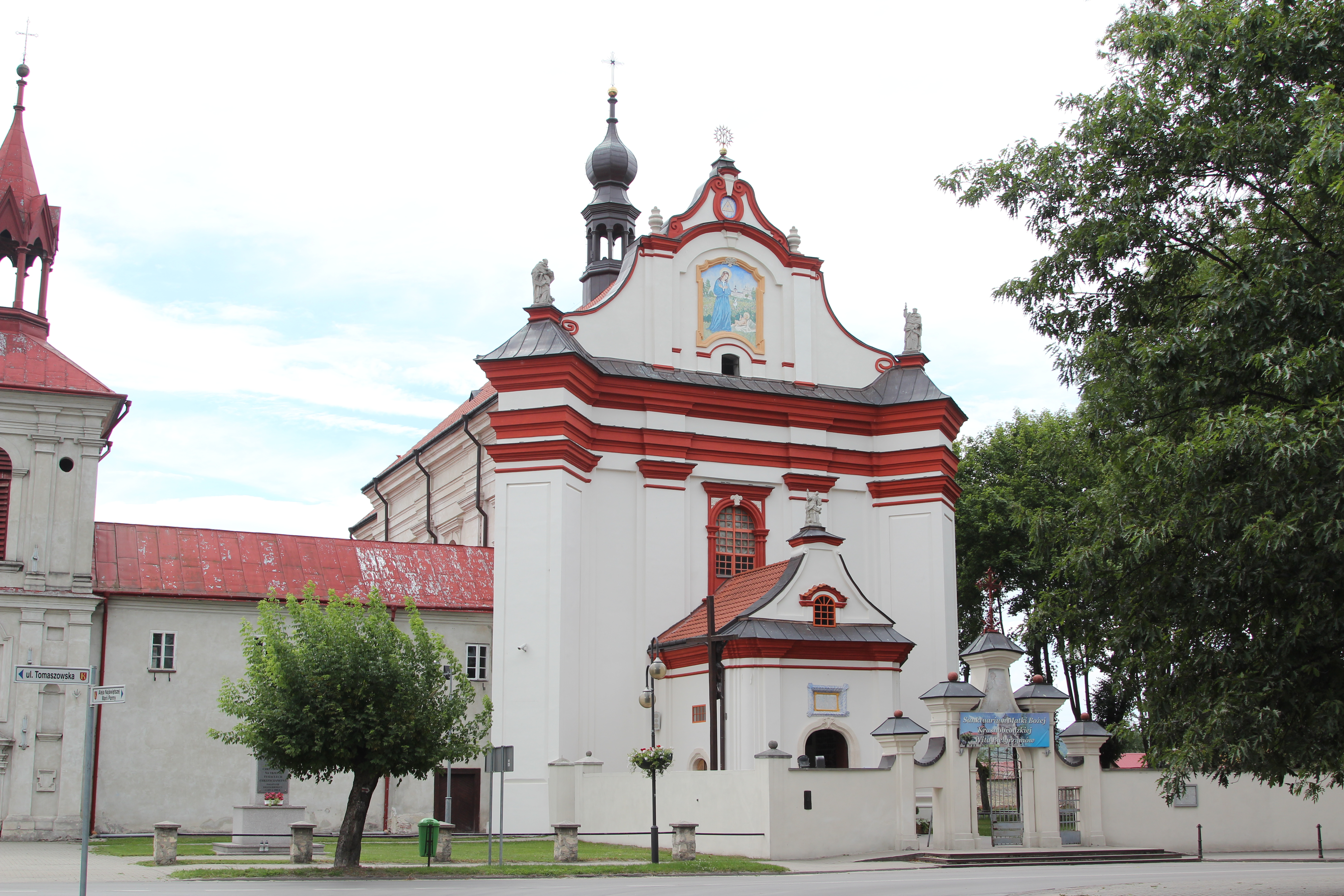
- Baroque Church of the Visitation in Krasnobród

- Coat of arms

- Location within Poland
- Coordinates: 50°32′41″N 23°13′5″E
- Country: Poland
- Voivodeship: Lublin
- County: Zamość
- Gmina: Krasnobród

Government
  - Mayor: Kazimierz Misztal (Ind.)

Area
  - Total: 6.99 km^{2} (2.70 sq mi)

Population (2006)
  - Total: 3,047
  - Density: 436/km^{2} (1,130/sq mi)
- Time zone: UTC+1 (CET)
  - Summer (DST): UTC+2 (CEST)
- Postal code: 22–440
- Car plates: LZA
- Website: www.krasnobrod.pl

Krasnobród (Polish: [krasˈnɔbrut]) is a spa town in Zamość County, Lublin Voivodeship, Poland. It is located near the Roztocze National Park and Krasnobród Landscape Park. The Wieprz River flows through the town. Points of interest include an old church and a former Dominican monastery in Krasnobród-Podklasztor and a landscape park with an old manor in Krasnobród-Podzamek (sanatorium for children now).

== History ==
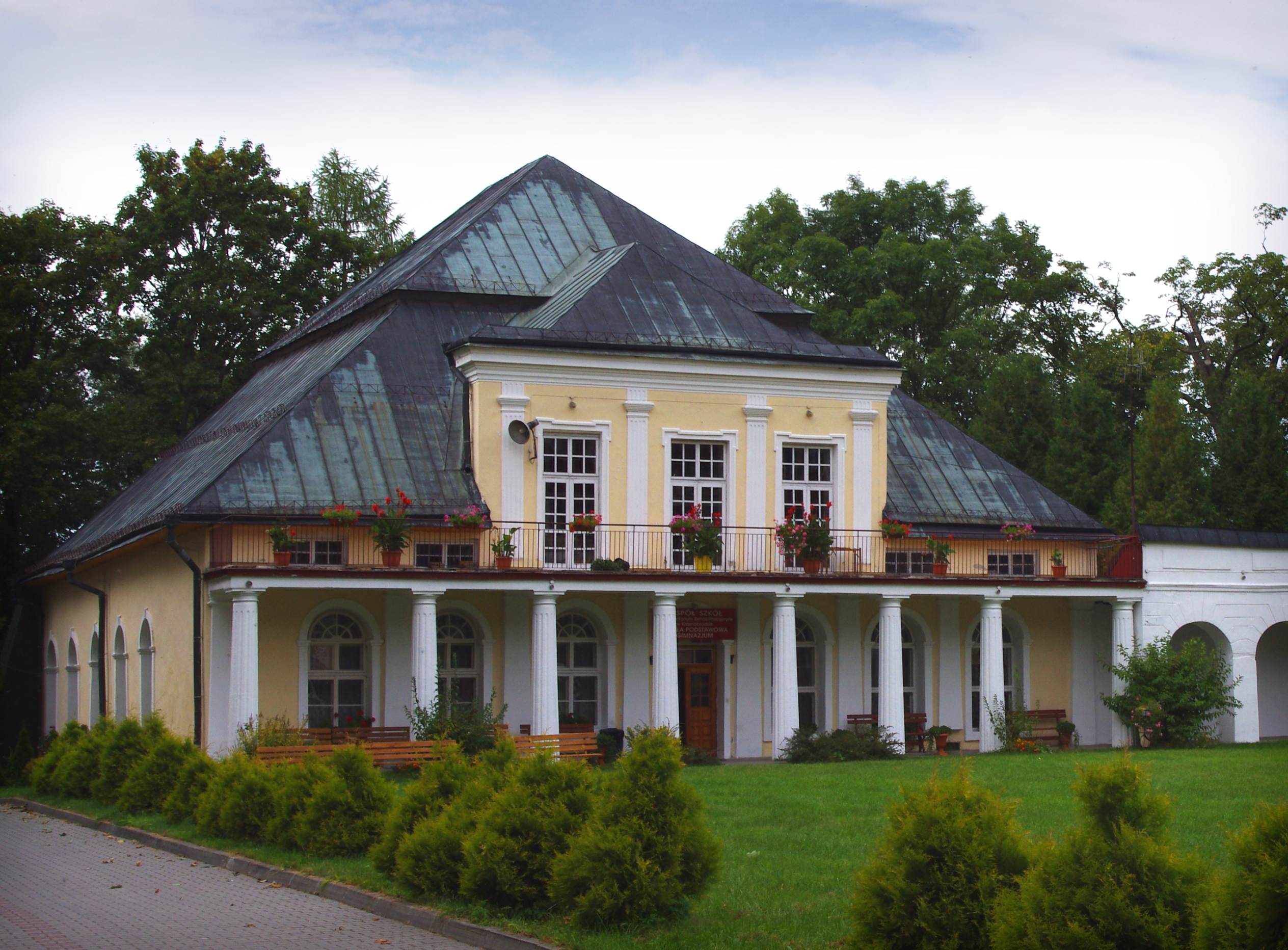
Krasnobród Sanatorium, formerly the Leszczyński Palace

The name of the town comes from the Old Polish krasny bród, which in English means "beautiful ford". According to records, in the mid-16th century the village of Krasnobród was owned by the noble Lipski family. In either 1572 or 1576, it received town charter. At that time, Krasnobród was located near the boundary between Chełm Land (part of its Ruthenian Voivodeship) and the Bełz Voivodeship, both within the Lesser Poland Province of the Kingdom of Poland. Across centuries, it remained a private town, owned by several prominent families such as the Leszczyński's, the Zamoyski's, the Tarnowski's and the Jackowski's. Its last owners were the Fudakowski family. Due to location away from main thoroughfares, Krasnobród remained a small town and never turned into an important economic hub.

Until World War II, the population of Krasnobród was ethnically mixed, with dominant Polish and Jewish communities, and small Ukrainian minority. The Roman Catholic parish was established probably in mid-16th century. In 1595, local church was turned into a Calvinist prayer house, remaining so until 1647. On November 23, 1664, Voivode of Sandomierz Jan Zamoyski signed a bill, upon which a Dominican Monastery was established locally.

=== Age of partitions ===
The town suffered during the Khmelnytsky Uprising, and in frequent raids of the Crimean Tatars. In one such raid, Krasnobród was completely burned, together with the church (see the Battle of Krasnobród (1672)). As a result, it ceased to be a town for almost a hundred years until 1763, when the town charter was regranted to Krasnobród due to population growth.

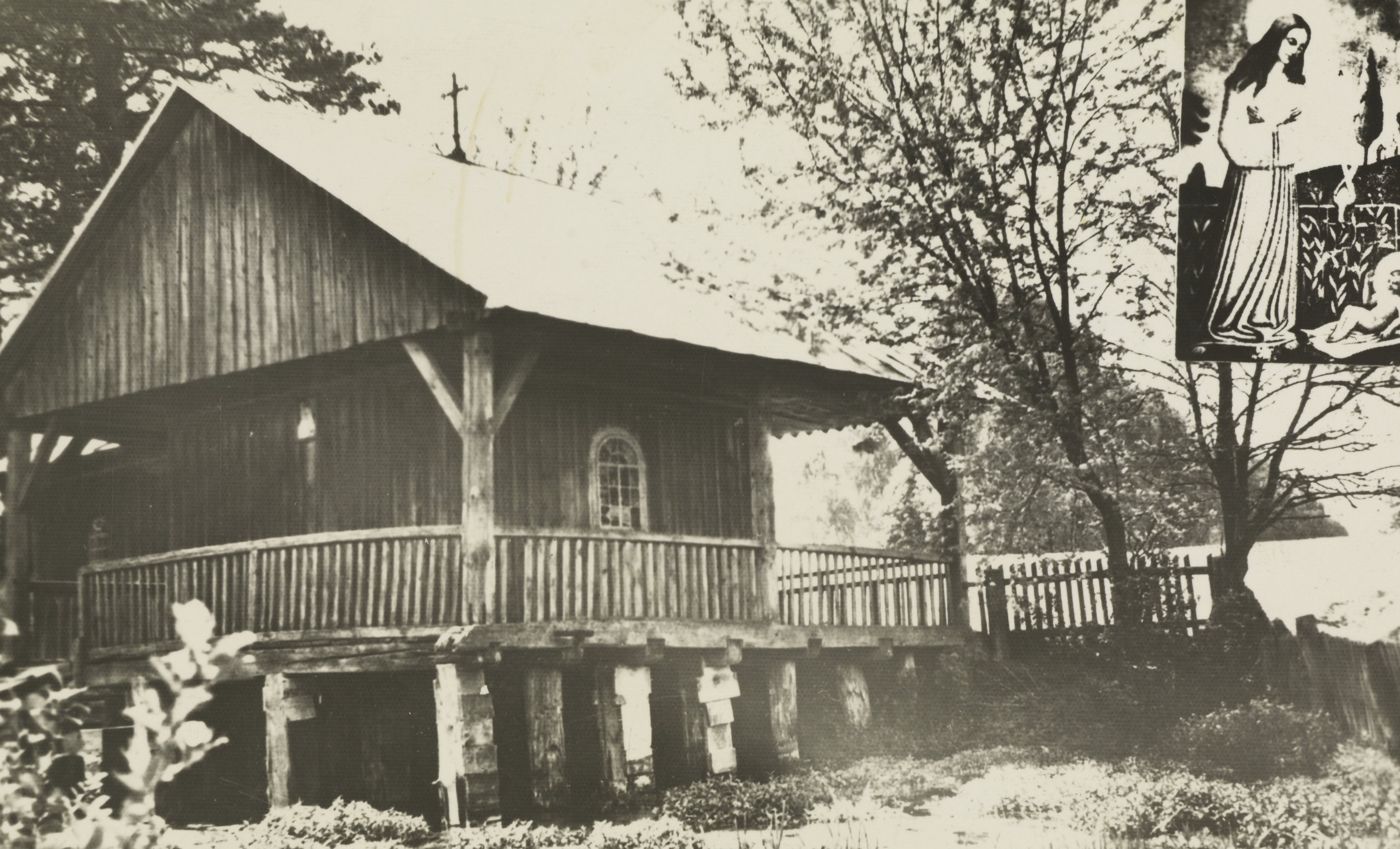
Early-20th-century view of the Chapel On the Water

Following the late-18th-century Partitions of Poland, Krasnobród was seized by the Habsburg Empire. After the Polish victory in the Austro-Polish War of 1809, it became part of the short-lived Duchy of Warsaw, and after the duchy's dissolution in 1815, it became part of the Zamość District of the Russian-controlled Congress Poland. During the January Uprising against the Tsarist domination on March 24, 1863, the Battle of Krasnobród took place here. Soon afterwards, Krasnobród lost its town charter again, this time as a punishment for the support of the rebellion.

In late 19th century, thanks to the efforts of Dr. Alfred Rose, Krasnobród became one of the first European spas for the tuberculosis patients. The idea however, was not successful due to poor communication links with European capitals. During World War I, in June 1915 a battle between imperial Russians and Austrians took place in the town. After the rebirth of the Second Polish Republic Krasnobród again joined the sovereign Poland.

=== World War II ===
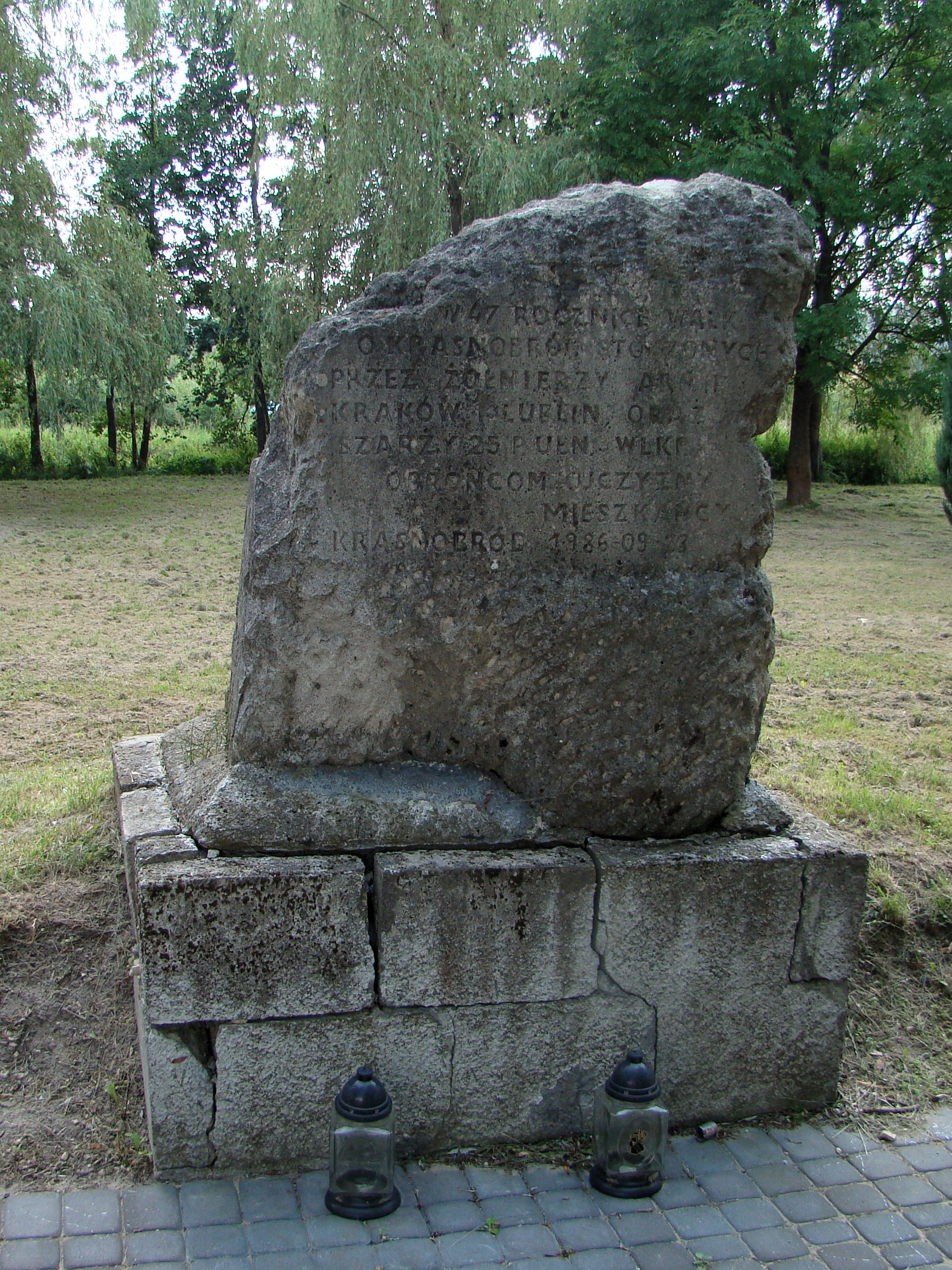
Memorial to the Polish Defense of Krasnobród in 1939

Following the joint Nazi German and Soviet invasion of Poland in World War II, on 17–26 September 1939 Krasnobród was the location of intense fighting between Polish Army Kraków, the Army Lublin, and the German Wehrmacht in the Battle of Tomaszów Lubelski. Polish cavalry of the 25th Greater Poland Uhlan Regiment defeated the German mounted brigade and temporarily re-captured Krasnobród in the Battle of Krasnobród which took place on September 23, 1939. The town soon became part of the General Government ruled by Nazi Germany.

In 1942, during the Holocaust in occupied Poland the town was the target of a pacification operation involving the massacre of some 200 Polish Jews amidst wanton destruction of wealth. Nevertheless, the area remained a center of the activities of the Home Army. On July 5, 1943, German units ordered all residents to abandon their houses, and Krasnobród was left empty. On June 22, 1944, the village was captured by the Red Army. Due to wartime destruction, Krasnobród lost its unique historic architecture featuring heritage wooden houses.

== Tourism ==
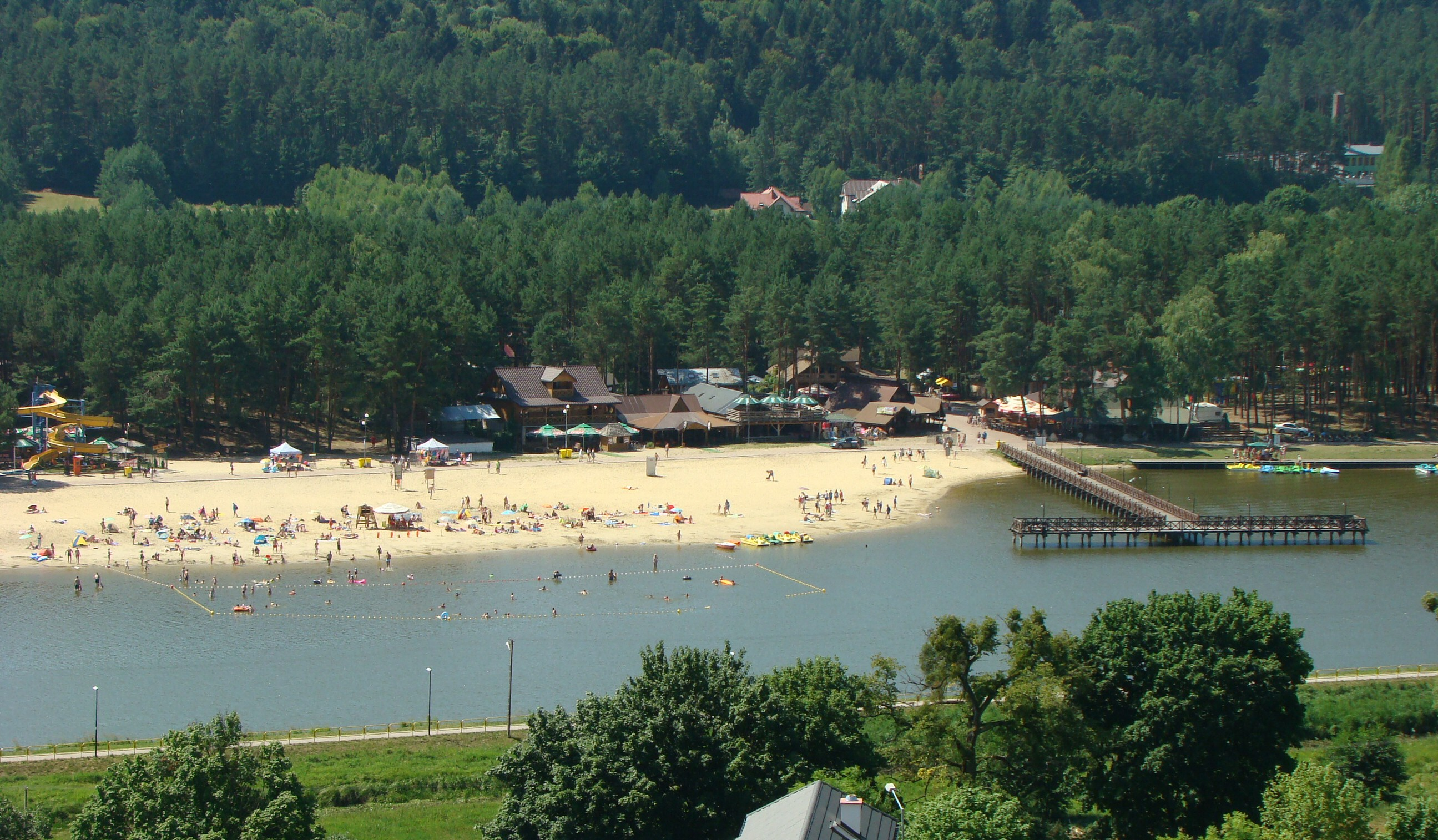
Krasnobród zalew

Krasnobród has been a tourist destination for hundreds of years beginning with the health-related visit of Marie Casimire Louise de La Grange d'Arquien, the wife of John III Sobieski (1629–1696), who went there to take advantage of the springs believed to have miraculous healing properties. The recreational offers include the man-made lake within the Krasnobród Landscape Park and kayaking tours on the Wieprz river, as well as numerous nature and hiking trails.

== See also ==
- First Battle of Krasnobród during the Polish–Ottoman War (1672–76)
- Second Battle of Krasnobród during the January Uprising
- Third Battle of Krasnobród on 23 September 1939, during the invasion of Poland by Nazi Germany

Media related to Krasnobród at Wikimedia Commons
