= Podklasztor =

- Village
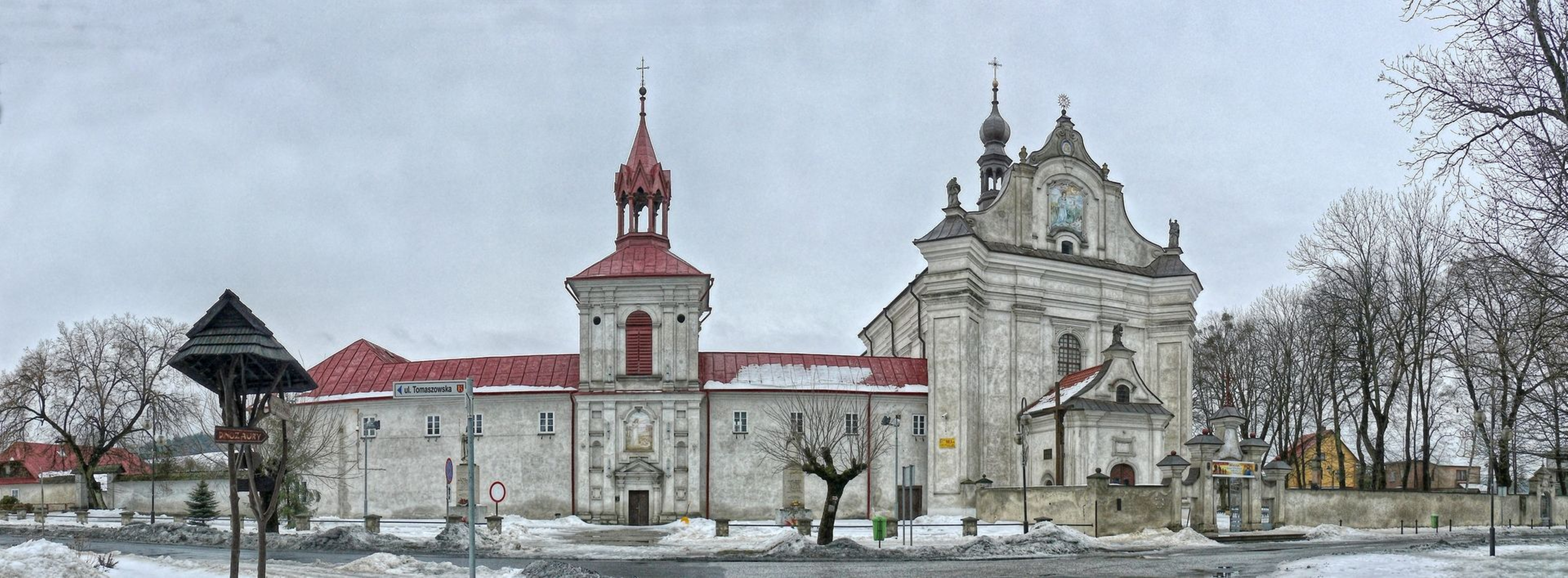
- Shrine of Our Lady of Krasnobród

- Location within Poland
- Coordinates: 50°32′3″N 23°14′19″E
- Country: Poland
- Voivodeship: Lublin
- County: Zamość
- Gmina: Krasnobród

Podklasztor [pɔtˈklaʂtɔr] (English: "Under-monastery") is a former village in the administrative district of Gmina Krasnobród, within Zamość County, Lublin Voivodeship, in eastern Poland. It has been part of Krasnobród since 1995. There is a former Dominican monastery and Roman Catholic Shrine of Our Lady of Krasnobród (Sanktuarium Matki Bożej Krasnobrodzkiej).
