= 25th Greater Poland Uhlan Regiment =

Poland army unit

25th Greater Poland Uhlan Regiment (Polish: 25 Pułk Ułanów Wielkopolskich, 25 puł) was a Polish cavalry unit of the Polish Army in the Second Polish Republic. Formed in 1920, it fought both in the Polish–Soviet War and the 1939 Invasion of Poland. In 1924–1939, the regiment was garrisoned in the town of Pruzany (current Belarus), and belonged to Nowogródzka Cavalry Brigade.

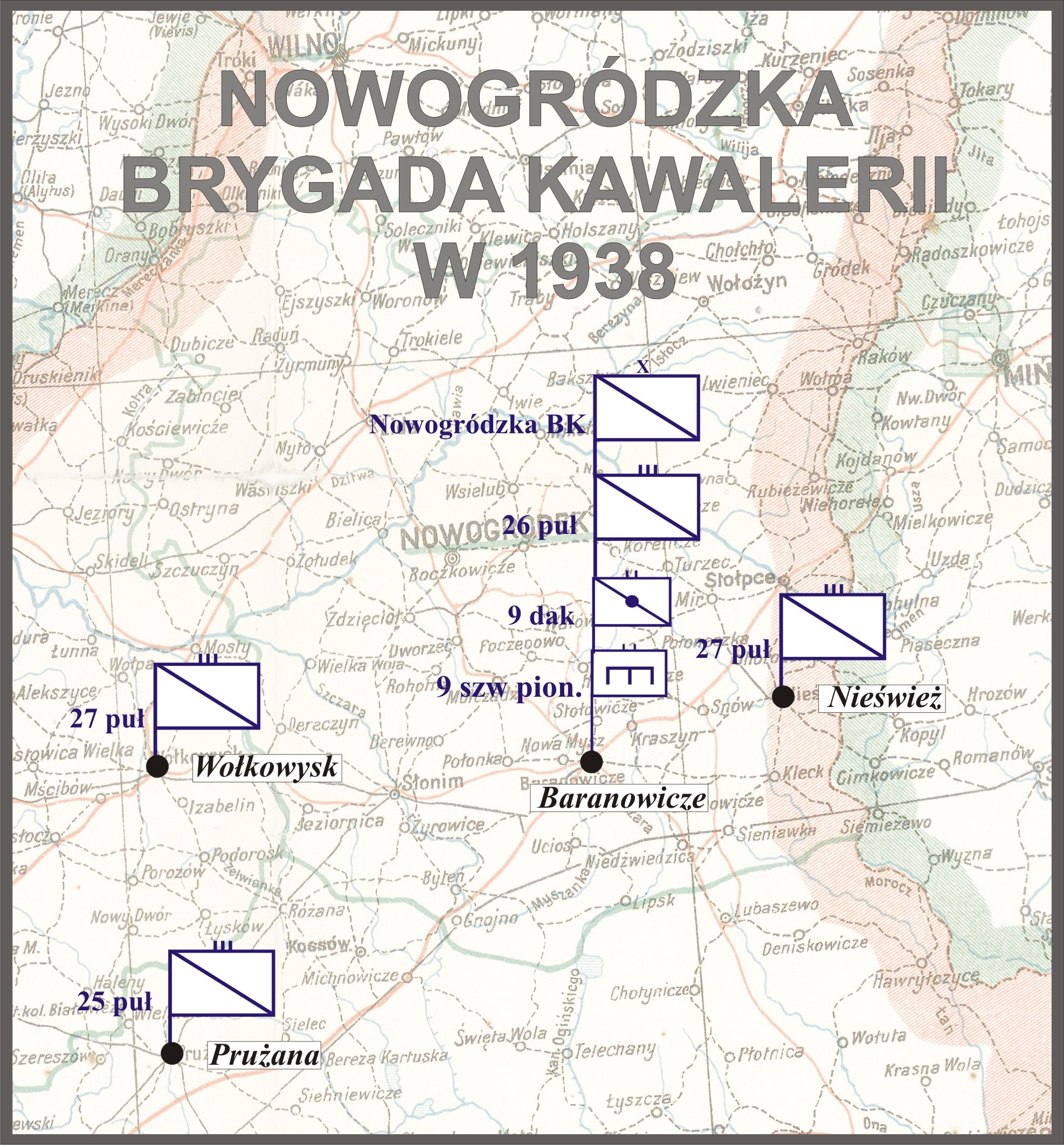
Nowogródzka BK w 1938

The history of the unit dates back to mid-July 1920, when the 115th Greater Poland Uhlan Regiment was formed out of reserve squadrons of the 15th and 16th Poznań Uhlan Regiments, and 2nd Mounted Rifles Regiment from Pińczów. On July 29, 1920, the new unit, with 473 sabres, was sent to the Polish–Soviet frontline near Łomża, where it protected the Narew crossings, and immediately clashed with Soviet cavalry. On August 8, the regiment joined the 8th Cavalry Brigade, fighting near Ciechanów and Mława. It completed its mission in late October 1920, near Korosten. By that time, the regiment shrank to only 250 sabres.

During the 1939 Invasion of Poland, the regiment was part of Nowogródzka Cavalry Brigade. On September 23, 1939, the unit carried out a famous charge in the Battle of Krasnobród. The uhlans managed to push the Wehrmacht out of the town of Krasnobród, capturing the staff of German 8th Infantry Division.

The regiment was finally destroyed on September 27 near Wladypol (current Ukraine), and its survivors crossed the Hungarian border, to continue fighting in the West. In recognition of the bravery of its soldiers, the 25th Greater Poland Uhlan Regiment was awarded the Virtuti Militari.

On January 5, 1945 in the town of Maglie, Italy, the 25th Armoured-Motorized Greater Poland Uhlan Regiment was formed, as part of the 5th Kresowa Infantry Division. The regiment did not fight in any battles, and was formally dissolved on May 5, 1947.

== Commandants ==
- Colonel Maciej Mielzynski (1920),
- Colonel Erazm Stablewski (1920),
- Rotmistrz Witold Radecki-Mikulicz (1920–1921),
- Colonel Roland Bogusz (1921–1922),
- Colonel Aleksander Zelio (1922–1923),
- Colonel Wlodzimierz Tyszkiewicz (1923–1924),
- Colonel Anatol Jasienski (1924–1925),
- Colonel Spirydion Koiszewski (1925–1932),
- Colonel Witold Dzierzykraj-Morawski (1932–1937),
- Colonel Bogdan Stachlewski (1937–1939),
- Colonel Wilhelm Lewicki (1945),
- Colonel Edward Milewski (1945–1947).

== Symbols ==
The flag of the regiment was handed during a ceremony which took place on April 29, 1923 in Nowogrodek. It accompanied the uhlans during the 1939 campaign, and was buried on September 28, 1939 in a forest near Wola Sudkowska (current Ukraine).

The badge, accepted in 1925, was in the shape of a silver eagle, holding a brass shield with a Maltese cross.

== Sources ==
- Piotr Bauer: Zarys historii wojennej pułków polskich w kampanii wrześniowej. 17 Pułk Ułanów Wielkopolskich. Warszawa: Oficyna Wydawnicza "Ajaks", 1994
- Henryk Smaczny: Księga kawalerii polskiej 1914–1947: rodowody, barwa, broń. Warszawa: TESCO, 1989
