= Gmina Krasnobród =

Gmina Krasnobród Krasnobród Commune
- Gmina
- Coat of arms
- Interactive map of Gmina Krasnobród
- Coordinates (Krasnobród): 50°32′N 23°11′E
- Country: Poland
- Voivodeship: Lublin
- County: Zamość County
- Seat: Krasnobród

Area
  - Total: 124.85 km^{2} (48.20 sq mi)

Population (2013)
  - Total: 7,243
  - Density: 58.01/km^{2} (150.3/sq mi)
  - Urban: 3,117
  - Rural: 4,126
- Website: http://www.krasnobrod.pl

Gmina Krasnobród is an urban-rural gmina (administrative district) in Zamość County, Lublin Voivodeship, in eastern Poland. Its seat is the town of Krasnobród, which lies approximately 22 kilometres (14 mi) south of Zamość and 91 km (57 mi) south-east of the regional capital Lublin.

The gmina covers an area of 124.85 square kilometres (48.2 sq mi), and as of 2006 its total population is 7,273 (out of which the population of Krasnobród amounts to 3,047, and the population of the rural part of the gmina is 4,226).

The gmina contains part of the protected area called Krasnobród Landscape Park.

== Villages ==
Apart from the town of Krasnobród, Gmina Krasnobród contains the villages and settlements of Dominikanówka, Grabnik, Hucisko, Hutki, Hutków, Kaczórki, Majdan Mały, Majdan Wielki, Malewszczyzna, Nowa Wieś, Podklasztor, Stara Huta, Wólka Husińska and Zielone.

== Neighbouring gminas ==
Gmina Krasnobród is bordered by the gminas of Adamów, Józefów, Krynice, Susiec, Tarnawatka, Tomaszów Lubelski and Zwierzyniec.
