= Battle of Krasnobród (1939) =

Battle during the German invasion of Poland

Coordinates: 50°32′41″N 23°13′05″E

- Part of Invasion of Poland
Date	23 September 1939
Location	Krasnobród, Lublin Voivodeship, Poland
Result	Polish victory

Belligerents
Poland	Germany

Commanders and leaders
(Second Polish Republic) Bohdan Stachlewski (Second Polish Republic) Tadeusz Gerlecki †	(Nazi Germany) Rudolf Koch-Erpach

Strength
Nowogródzka Cavalry Brigade; 2nd Horse Artillery Division; 2nd Horse Rifles Regiment; 1st KOP Cavalry Regiment	8th Infantry Division; Heavy East Prussian cavalry

Casualties and losses
26 killed 35 wounded	47 killed 30 wounded 100 men captured

The World War II Battle of Krasnobród took place on 23 September 1939 near the town of Krasnobród. It was fought between the forces of the Polish Army and the German Wehrmacht during the Invasion of Poland. It was one of the last battles in European warfare in which cavalry was used on both sides.

== Battle ==
At approximately 7am a group of Polish cavalry of the Nowogródek Cavalry Brigade left the forests halfway between Zamość and Tomaszów Lubelski. The 25th Greater Poland Uhlan Regiment under Col. Bogdan Stachlewski formed the front guard of the formation and was entrusted with recapturing the pivotal town of Krasnobród. The German 8th Infantry Division fortified the town located on a hill with two lines of trenches. In order to minimize the effect of enemy numerical superiority, the Polish commander split his forces in two and ordered a cavalry charge, with each of the squadrons charging separately at a different sector of the front.

The German forces were caught completely by surprise and the first squadron successfully broke through their positions, while the German infantry started a chaotic retreat towards the centre of the town, followed by the Polish cavalry using sabres and lances. The second squadron under Lt. Tadeusz Gerlecki joined the charge towards the hill. A unit of organic cavalry from the German 8th Infantry Division counter-charged from the hill, but was repelled. The Polish units started a pursuit after the fleeing enemy and entered the city. Although the Poles suffered heavy losses due to machine gun fire (with Gerlecki's squadron losing all but 30 men), the town was retaken and the Poles took the headquarters of the division, together with about 100 German soldiers. Forty Polish combatants previously taken prisoner by the Germans were freed.

== See also ==
- List of World War II military equipment of Poland
- List of German military equipment of World War II
