= Battle of Krasnobród (1672) =

Battle that occurred during the Polish-Ottoman War of 1672-1676

- Part of The Polish-Ottoman War (1672–1676)
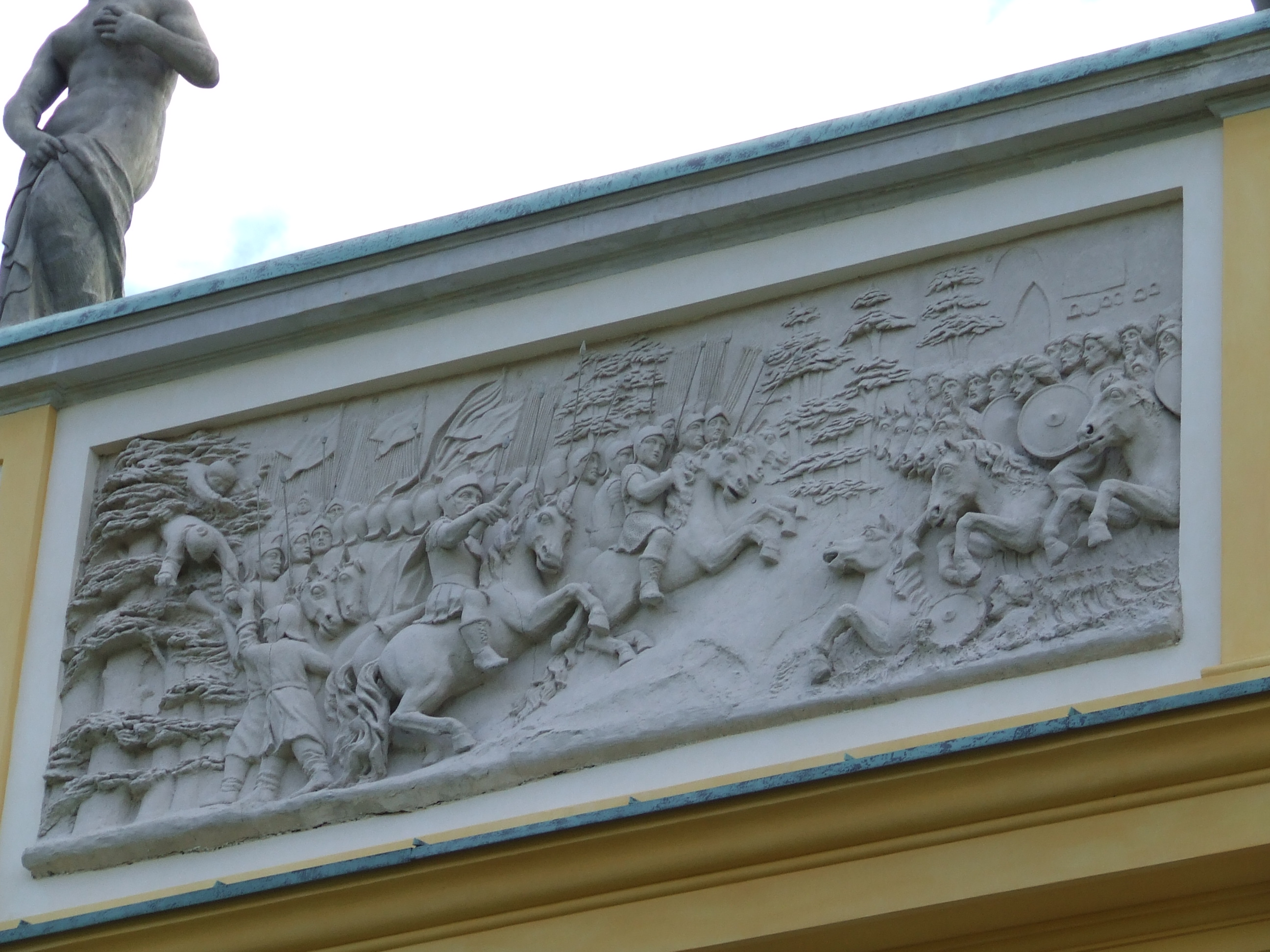
- Expedition of Jan Sobieski in 1672; Embossed art at the Wilanów palace in Warsaw
Date	5–6 October 1672
Location	Krasnobród, Polish–Lithuanian Commonwealth 50°32′41″N 23°13′05″E
Result	Polish-Cossack victory

Belligerents
Polish–Lithuanian Commonwealth; Cossack Hetmanate	Crimean Khanate; Ottoman Empire

Commanders and leaders
Jan Sobieski; Mykhailo Khanenko	Selim I Giray

Strength
Unknown	Unknown

Casualties and losses
Unknown	Unknown

The Battle of Krasnobród took place on 5–6 October 1672, during the Polish-Ottoman War. It was part of Jan Sobieski’s autumn expedition, aimed at the destruction of mounted Tatar units, which plundered southeastern provinces of the Polish–Lithuanian Commonwealth.

== Battle ==
In early October 1672, Hetman Sobieski was stationed in Krasnystaw. On 5 October after finding out that several Tatar units were plundering the area of Zamość, he decided to destroy them. The main Tatar forces camped near Krasnobród, and during the night of October 5–6, Sobieski began a 52-kilometer march, which took place in a heavy rain.

Early the next morning, the Tatar camp was attacked by pro-Polish Cossacks, loyal to Mykhailo Khanenko. When the news of the skirmish reached Sobieski, he decided to intervene, arriving at the site of the battle after 30 minutes. Polish forces joined the fighting, while Khanenko himself left Krasnobród and headed to Zamosc. Several Tatar units were destroyed, and some 2,500 Polish civilians captured by the invaders were freed and sent to Zamosc.
