= Battle of Krasnobród (1863) =

Coordinates: 50°32′41″N 23°13′05″E

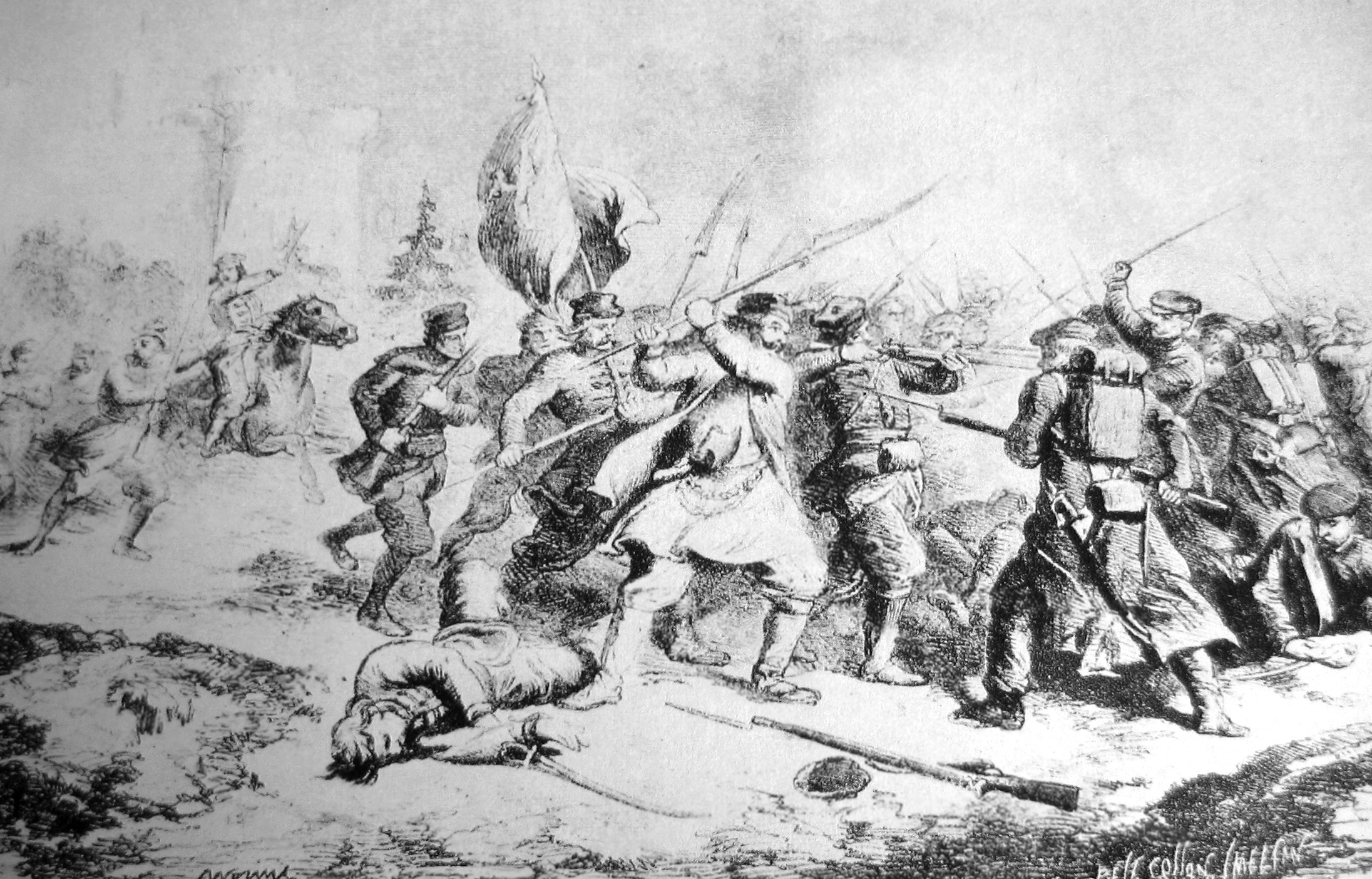
Battle of Krasnobród, 1863, during the Uprising

The Battle of Krasnobrod was one of the many battles of the January Uprising against the Russian control over Poland. It took place on March 24, 1863, near Krasnobrod in southeastern corner of Tsarist Congress Poland in the territory of the Russian Partition. The Polish forces under Marcin Borelowski clashed with troops of the Imperial Russian Army, commanded by Mayor Yakov Ogalin. The battle ended in Russian victory due to overwhelming numerical superiority.

On March 22, the Polish unit of Borelowski, which marched southwards from Podlasie, reached Hrubieszow, where it burned a Russian storehouse. The garrison of Russian-held Zamosc Fortress sent a unit of Mayor Ogalin, whose task was to find the insurgents and destroy them. On March 24, Poles and Russians clashed near Krasnobrod, in a location that now is a nature reserve. Polish unit consisted of 80 riflemen, 20 cavalry and 160 kosynierzy, and Polish losses amounted to 42 men, including 7 officers.

After the battle, bodies of 42 insurgents (32 of them remained unknown) were buried at a local parish cemetery. In 1930, a monument dedicated to the skirmish was unveiled there.
