= Nowa Wieś, Gmina Krasnobród =

Nowa Wieś
- Village
- Location within Poland
- Coordinates: 50°32′55″N 23°13′34″E
- Country: Poland
- Voivodeship: Lublin
- County: Zamość
- Gmina: Krasnobród

Nowa Wieś [ˈnɔva ˈvjɛɕ] is a village in the administrative district of Gmina Krasnobród, within Zamość County, Lublin Voivodeship, in eastern Poland.
