= Zielone, Lublin Voivodeship =

Zielone
- Village
- Location within Poland
- Coordinates: 50°29′55″N 23°17′21″E
- Country: Poland
- Voivodeship: Lublin
- County: Zamość
- Gmina: Krasnobród
- Population: 470

Zielone [ʑɛˈlɔnɛ] is a village in the administrative district of Gmina Krasnobród, within Zamość County, Lublin Voivodeship, in eastern Poland.
