= Krasnobród Landscape Park =

Protected area in Poland

- Krasnobrodzki Park Krajobrazowy
- IUCN category V (protected landscape/seascape)
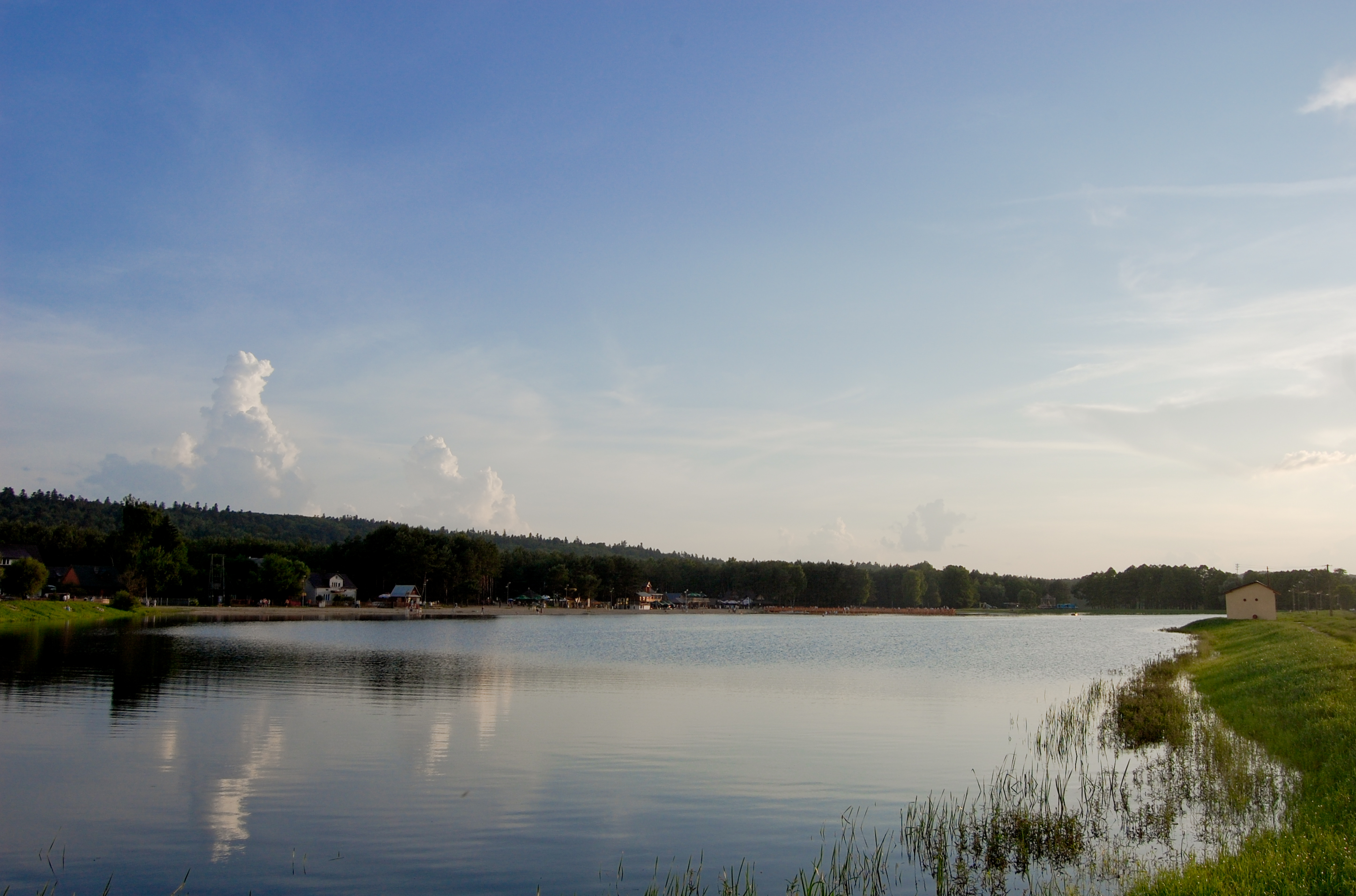
- Krasnobród lake
- Interactive map of Krasnobród Landscape Park
- Location: Lublin Voivodeship
- Coordinates: 50°32′N 23°11′E
- Area: 93.90 km^{2} (36.25 sq mi)
- Established: 1988

Krasnobród Landscape Park (Krasnobrodzki Park Krajobrazowy) is a protected area (Landscape Park) in eastern Poland, established in 1988 below the town of Krasnobród and covering an area of 93.90 square kilometres (36.25 sq mi). It is one of four landscape parks in the Roztocze region.

== Location ==
The Park lies within Lublin Voivodeship: in Biłgoraj County (Gmina Józefów), Tomaszów County (Gmina Susiec, Gmina Tomaszów Lubelski) and Zamość County (Gmina Adamów, Gmina Krasnobród). It is a popular tourist destination for the region.

Within the Landscape Park are two nature reserves.

== See also ==
- List of landscape parks of Poland
