= Grabnik, Gmina Krasnobród =

Grabnik
- Village
- Location within Poland
- Coordinates: 50°33′54″N 23°12′53″E
- Country: Poland
- Voivodeship: Lublin
- County: Zamość
- Gmina: Krasnobród

Grabnik [ˈɡrabnik] is a village in the administrative district of Gmina Krasnobród, within Zamość County, Lublin Voivodeship, in eastern Poland.
