= 26th Greater Poland Uhlan Regiment =

Cavalry unit in the Polish Army

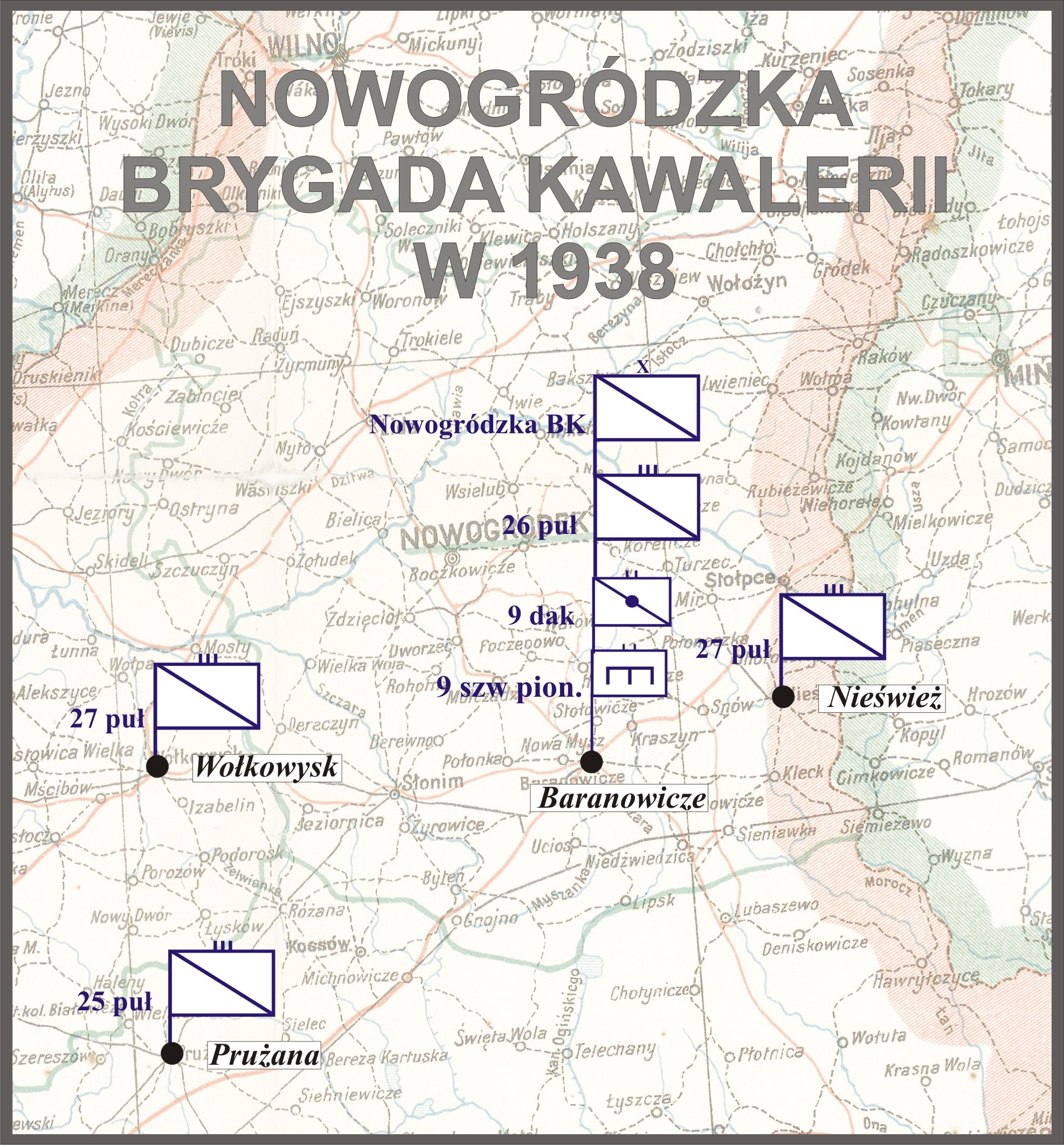
Nowogródzka BK w 1938

26th Greater Poland Uhlan Regiment of Hetman Jan Karol Chodkiewicz (Polish: 26 Pułk Ułanów Wielkopolskich, im. Hetmana Jana Karola Chodkiewicza, 26 puł) was a cavalry unit of the Polish Army in the Second Polish Republic. Formed in July 1920, it fought both in the Polish-Soviet War and the 1939 Invasion of Poland. The regiment, named after Jan Karol Chodkiewicz, was garrisoned in the town of Baranowicze (now Baranavichy, Belarus), with its reserve squadron garrisoned in Łuków. In 1939, it belonged to Nowogrodzka Cavalry Brigade.

The history of the regiment dates back to July 1920, when Count Ignacy Mielzynski formed in Poznań the 215th Volunteer Regiment of Greater Poland Cavalry. Its name was later changed into the 26th Greater Poland Uhlan Regiment, and the unit was after Polish-Soviet War moved to Baranowicze, near the pre-1939 border between Poland and Soviet Russia. On October 16, 1936, Minister of Military Affairs, General Tadeusz Kasprzycki, named the regiment after Hetman Jan Karol Chodkiewicz.

The regiment, which was composed of volunteers from former Prussian Poland, was on August 13, 1920, sent by train from Poznań to Toruń. At that time, it had 878 soldiers and 330 horses. After arriving at Toruń, it was ordered to march to Golub-Dobrzyń, and take positions along the Drwęca river. In the morning of August 14, the uhlans were told that first Red Army units were within five kilometers of the rail station at Golub. Patrols were sent towards the enemy, and the squadrons rushed to their positions. The regiment was ordered to defend the line of the river, and to keep communication links between Działdowo and Toruń.

Since Soviet soldiers were spotted in Rypin and on the road near Klonowo, the regiment was ordered to reach Brodnica and defend the town. First clash with the enemy took place on August 16, along the Drwęca river. Meanwhile, the Soviets captured Brodnica, so Polish headquarters ordered a counterattack, which began on August 18 in the morning. Brodnica was recaptured, and the Soviets began their retreat towards Lidzbark.

On August 20, Polish troops recaptured the towns of Nowe Miasto Lubawskie and Lubawa, capturing several Soviet POWs. Four days later, the uhlans were transferred to Żuromin, to capture Bolshevik stragglers, hiding in local forests. On September 6, the regiment returned by rail to Poznań, with three captured Soviet flags. The uhlans were camped there in the barracks of the 15th Regiment, but after a short rest, they were sent back to the Soviet front (September 24). Via Kalisz – Warsaw – Czeremcha, the regiment was taken to the station of Świsłocz (now Svislach, Belarus), and then marched to the area of Wolkowysk. On September 28, the regiment was ordered to capture the town of Mir, with the Mir Castle Complex. This was achieved on October 3. The regiment then captured Zaslaw and Iwieniec. Finally, in cooperation with other Polish Army units, the Greater Poland uhlans entered Minsk, on October 16, at 7 a.m.

After the truce was declared, the regiment marched back to Iwieniec, where it remained until late November 1920. In the winter of 1920/1921, the uhlans patrolled the newly established border.

In the Second Polish Republic, the regiment was garrisoned in Baranowicze, and was famous for strict “Prussian-style” discipline, imposed on its soldiers.

== Commandants ==
- Colonel Ignacy Mielzynski (13 July 1920 – 19 December 1921),
- Colonel Ryszard Gieszkowski-Wolff-Plottegg (1924 – 29 November 1927),
- Colonel Roman Abraham (29 November 1927 – 22 March 1929),
- Colonel Tadeusz II Machalski (22 March 1929 – 1937),
- Colonel Ludwik Schweizer (1937 – September 1939).

== Symbols ==
The flag of the regiment was funded by the residents of the city of Poznan, and handed to the soldiers on September 14, 1920. It featured Saint Teresa on one side, and Polish Eagle on the other side.

On August 18, 1925, the old flag was replaced with a new one. It featured the coat of arms of the city of Poznan, the Jagiellonian Eagle, and the coat of arms of Brodnica, where the regiment fought its first battle.

The badge, approved in 1929, featured the Greater Poland Eagle, with the number 215, the date 1920, and the initial 26 U.

The regiment celebrated its holiday on August 18, the anniversary of the 1920 Battle of Brodnica, in which its soldiers captured three Soviet flags.

== See also ==
- Polish cavalry

== Sources ==
- Piotr Bauer: Zarys historii wojennej pułków polskich w kampanii wrześniowej. 17 Pułk Ułanów Wielkopolskich. Warsaw: Oficyna Wydawnicza "Ajaks", 1994
- Henryk Smaczny: Księga kawalerii polskiej 1914-1947: rodowody, barwa, broń. Warsaw: TESCO, 1989
