= 27th Uhlan Regiment (Poland) =

The 27th King Stefan Batory Uhlan Regiment (Polish: 27 Pułk Ułanów im. Króla Stefana Batorego, 27 puł) was a cavalry unit of the Polish Army during the Second Polish Republic. Formed in July 1920, it fought in the Polish-Soviet War and the 1939 Invasion of Poland. The regiment was garrisoned first in Włocławek, to be moved in August 1921 to Nieswiez (now Belarus). In 1939, it was part of the Nowogrodzka Cavalry Brigade. It fought in several battles in September 1939, capitulating to the Red Army near Wladypol, on 27 September 1939.

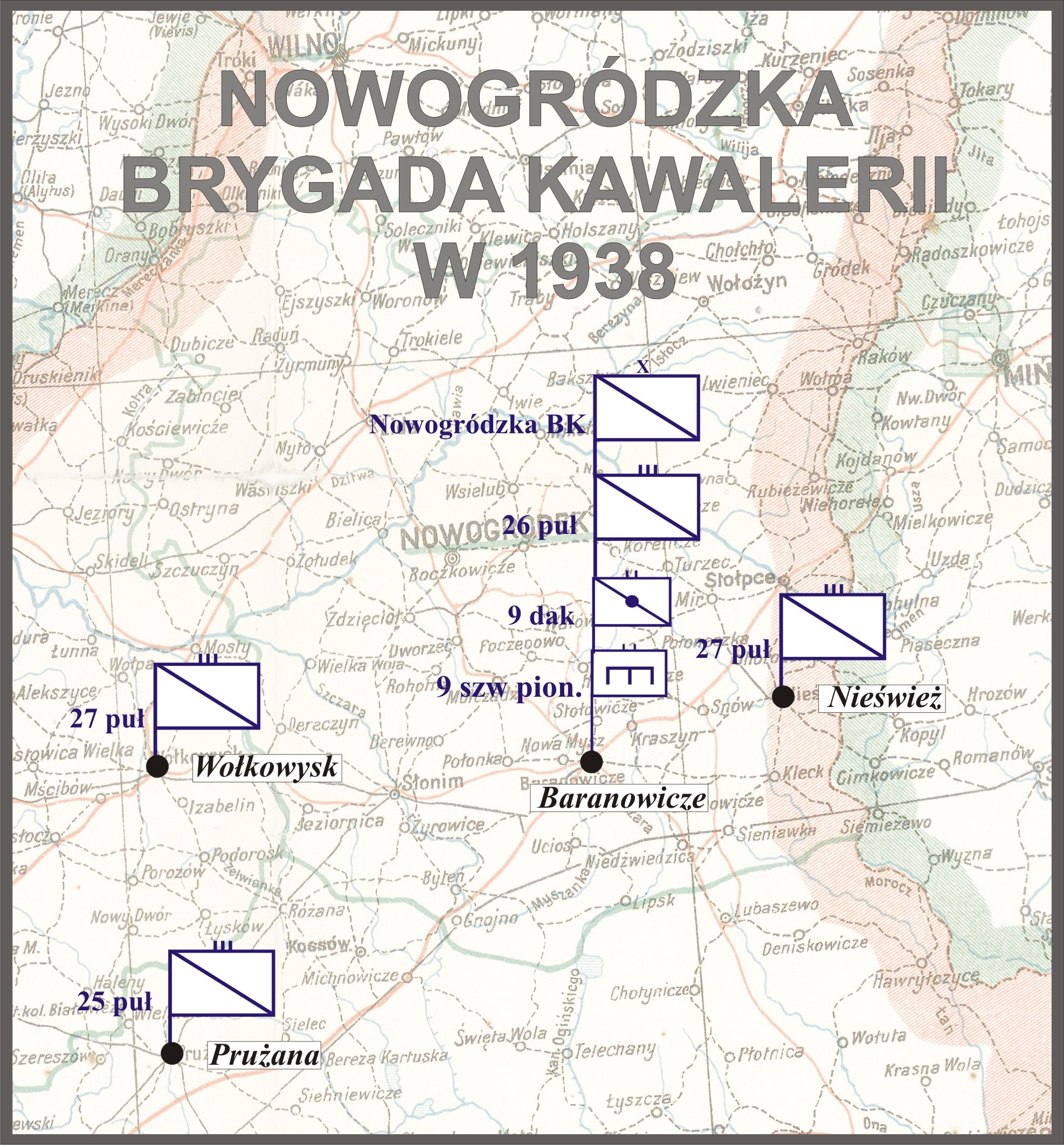
Nowogródzka BK w 1938

== Origins ==
The history of the regiment dates back to 28 July 1920, when Rotmistrz Adam Zakrzewski was named commandant of the new cavalry unit, called the 203rd Cavalry Regiment. His first order was issued on 29 July, and regimental officers were transferred from other, already existing units. At first, the regiment had four cavalry squadrons, plus a squadron of machine guns.

On 2 August 1920 in Kalisz, the oath of the soldiers took place. At that time, the unit had 27 officers, 716 soldiers and 652 horses. On 4 August, the regiment left Kalisz, and two days later it arrived at the train station in Ciechanow. Less than 24 hours later, and only seven days after its creation, the regiment clashed with Soviet cavalry, near the village of Przedwojewo. After this battle, the uhlans moved back to Ciechanow, to defend the town. Its losses were high, reaching up to 50% of the manpower.

In the night of 8/9 August, the uhlans rested, and on the next day, the 8th Cavalry Brigade, together with 27th Uhlan Regiment, was ordered to attack enemy positions near Glinojeck and Kraszewo. Repeated attacks of Polish soldiers were not successful, and Polish situation deteriorated by 11 August, when Soviet armies were spotted marching along the rail line Ciechanow - Modlin. On 12 August, the regiment clashed with the enemy in the village of Swiercze.

On 13 August 1920, the Battle of Warsaw (1920) began. Two squadrons of the regiment were ordered to support the 18th Infantry Division, while two remaining squadrons joined the Cavalry Group of General Aleksander Karnicki. In the night of 14/15 August, the regiment was located north of Ciechanow, capturing in a surprise attack supply units of the Soviet 4th Army, together with its radio station. As a result, Soviet 4th Army lost contact with other armies, and continued its march westwards, unaware of the Polish counteroffensive.

On 17 August, the regiment was transferred to the 9th Cavalry Brigade, which was part of the Northern Division of Colonel Dreszer (together with the 8th Cavalry Brigade). In the afternoon of that day, the regiment attacked Soviet infantry near Smardzewo. On 19 and 20 August, the regiment clashed with Soviet cavalry of Hayk Bzhishkyan. After the fierce battle, it rested until 3 September. Its losses in the period 7–27 August, amounted to 20% of manpower.

On 3 September 1920, the regiment was loaded on a train, and transported via Lublin, to Chełm. On 8 September, it marched towards Hrubieszów, crossing the Bug river, to advance on Soviet units, concentrated near Kowel. On 18 September, after a night attack, the uhlans captured Rowne. By late September, it advanced further eastwards, to Kostopol and Korzec.

The regiment spent the winter of 1920/1921 patrolling the Polish-Soviet demarcation line. On 10 February 1921, it was loaded on a train at Kowel, and transported first to Konin, then to Włocławek. In mid-1921, its name was changed into the 27th Uhlan Regiment, and in mid-August 1921, it was transported to Nieswiez. The regiment remained there until 1939.

== Commandants ==
- Rotmistrz Adam Zakrzewski (29 July – August 1920)
- Major Zygmunt Podhorski (2 August 1920)
- Major Adam Zakrzewski (1920–1921)
- Major Jan Reliszko (1921–1927)
- Colonel Stanislaw Rostworowski (1927–1929)
- Colonel Fryderyk Mally (1929–1934)
- Colonel Jozef Pajak (1934–1939)
- Colonel Zdzislaw Nurkiewicz (1943–1945)

== Symbols ==
The flag of the regiment was funded by the residents of Nieswiez County, and presented to the soldiers in 1922. It featured the coat of arms of Nieswiez, the painting of Our Lady, and the names of the battles: Ciechanów, Kraszewo, Smardzewo, Wolczek and Berezne.

== Sources ==
- Gnat-Wieteska, Zbigniew (1992). 27 Pułk Ułanów im. Króla Stefa Batorego [27th King Stefan Batory Uhlan Regiment]. Zarys historii wojennej pułków polskich w kampanii wrześniowej [Outline of the history of Polish regiments in the September campaign] (in Polish). Warsaw: Egross. ISBN 83-85253-17-3.
- Henryk Smaczny: Księga kawalerii polskiej 1914-1947: rodowody, barwa, broń. Warsaw: TESCO, 1989
