= Radenice =

- Municipality
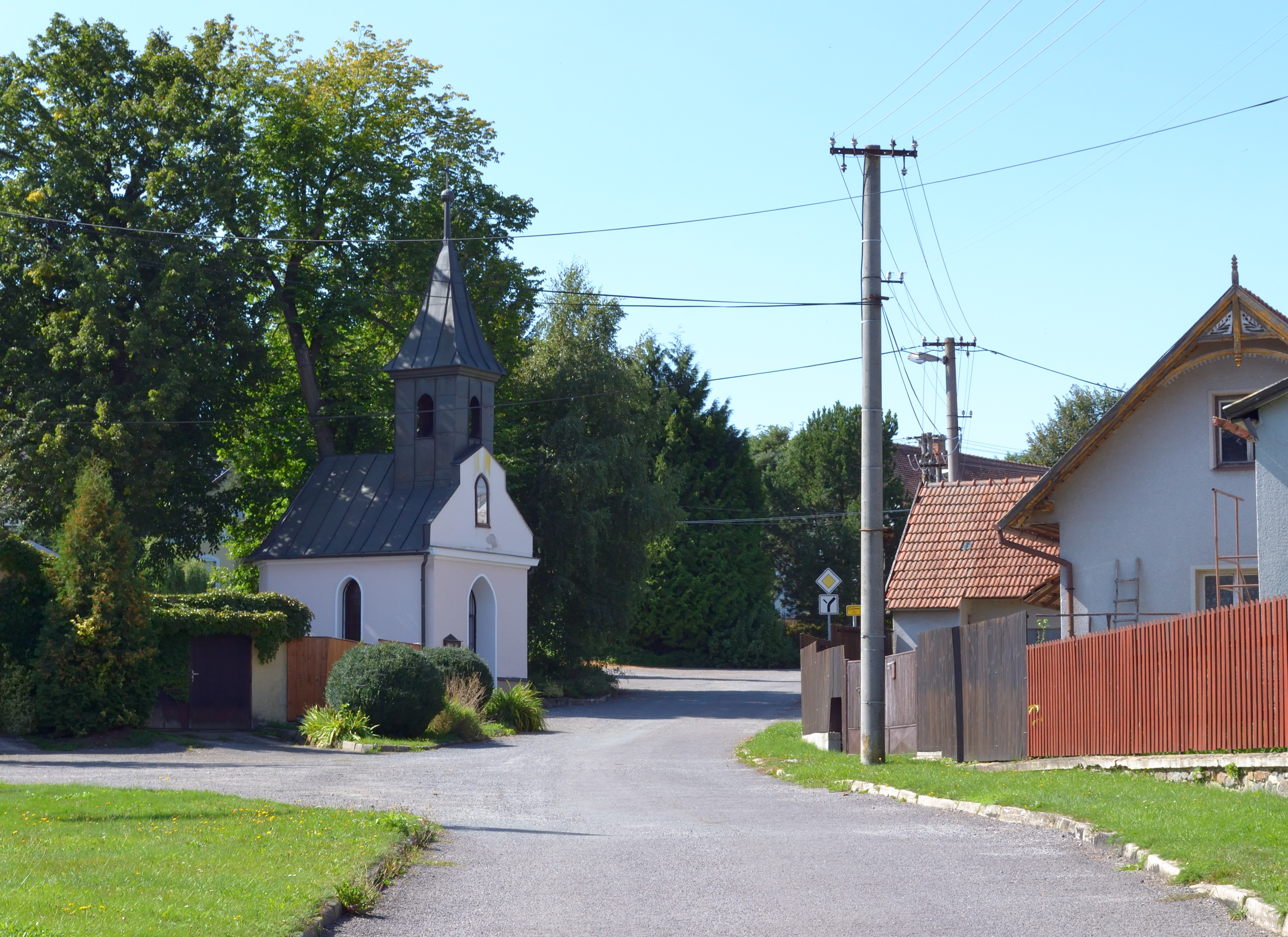
- Centre of Radenice

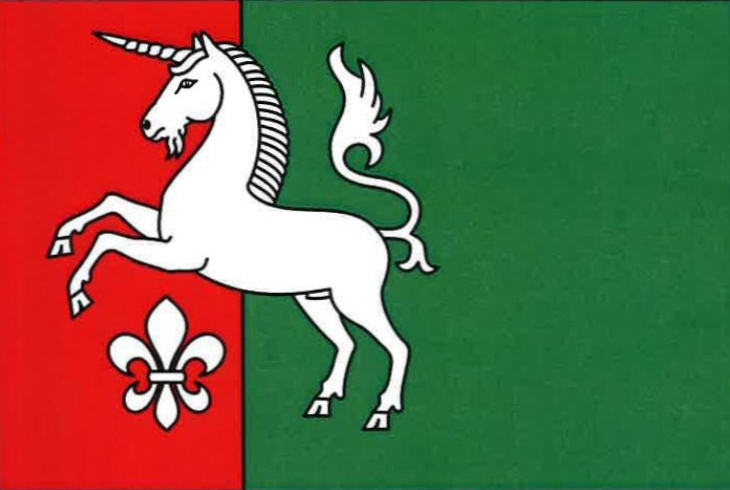
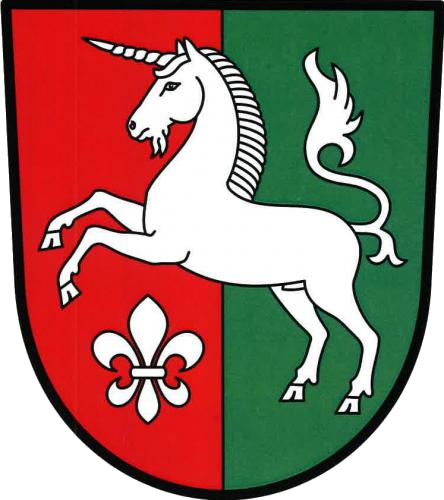
- Flag Coat of arms

- Location in the Czech Republic
- Coordinates: 49°25′38″N 16°3′53″E
- Country: Czech Republic
- Region: Vysočina
- District: Žďár nad Sázavou
- First mentioned: 1483

Area
  - Total: 6.73 km^{2} (2.60 sq mi)
- Elevation: 598 m (1,962 ft)

Population (2026-01-01)
  - Total: 163
  - Density: 24.2/km^{2} (62.7/sq mi)
- Time zone: UTC+1 (CET)
  - Summer (DST): UTC+2 (CEST)
- Postal code: 591 01
- Website: www.radenice.cz

Radenice is a municipality and village in Žďár nad Sázavou District in the Vysočina Region of the Czech Republic. It has about 200 inhabitants.

Radenice lies approximately 19 kilometres (12 mi) south-east of Žďár nad Sázavou, 36 km (22 mi) east of Jihlava, and 140 km (87 mi) south-east of Prague.

== Demographics ==
Historical population
Year	Pop.	±%
1869	204	—
1880	193	−5.4%
1890	192	−0.5%
1900	187	−2.6%
1910	167	−10.7%
1921	186	+11.4%
1930	187	+0.5%
1950	176	−5.9%
1961	183	+4.0%
1970	188	+2.7%
1980	191	+1.6%
1991	144	−24.6%
2001	157	+9.0%
2011	154	−1.9%
2021	173	+12.3%
Source: Censuses
