= Nowogródzka Cavalry Brigade =

Nowogródzka Cavalry Brigade (Polish: Nowogródzka Brygada Kawalerii) was a cavalry unit of the Polish Army in the interbellum period. It was created on April 1, 1937, out of the Baranowicze Cavalry Brigade. It took its name from Nowogródek town. Its headquarters were stationed in the town of Baranowicze. It consisted of several units, garrisoned in several towns located in northeast part of pre-1939 Poland:

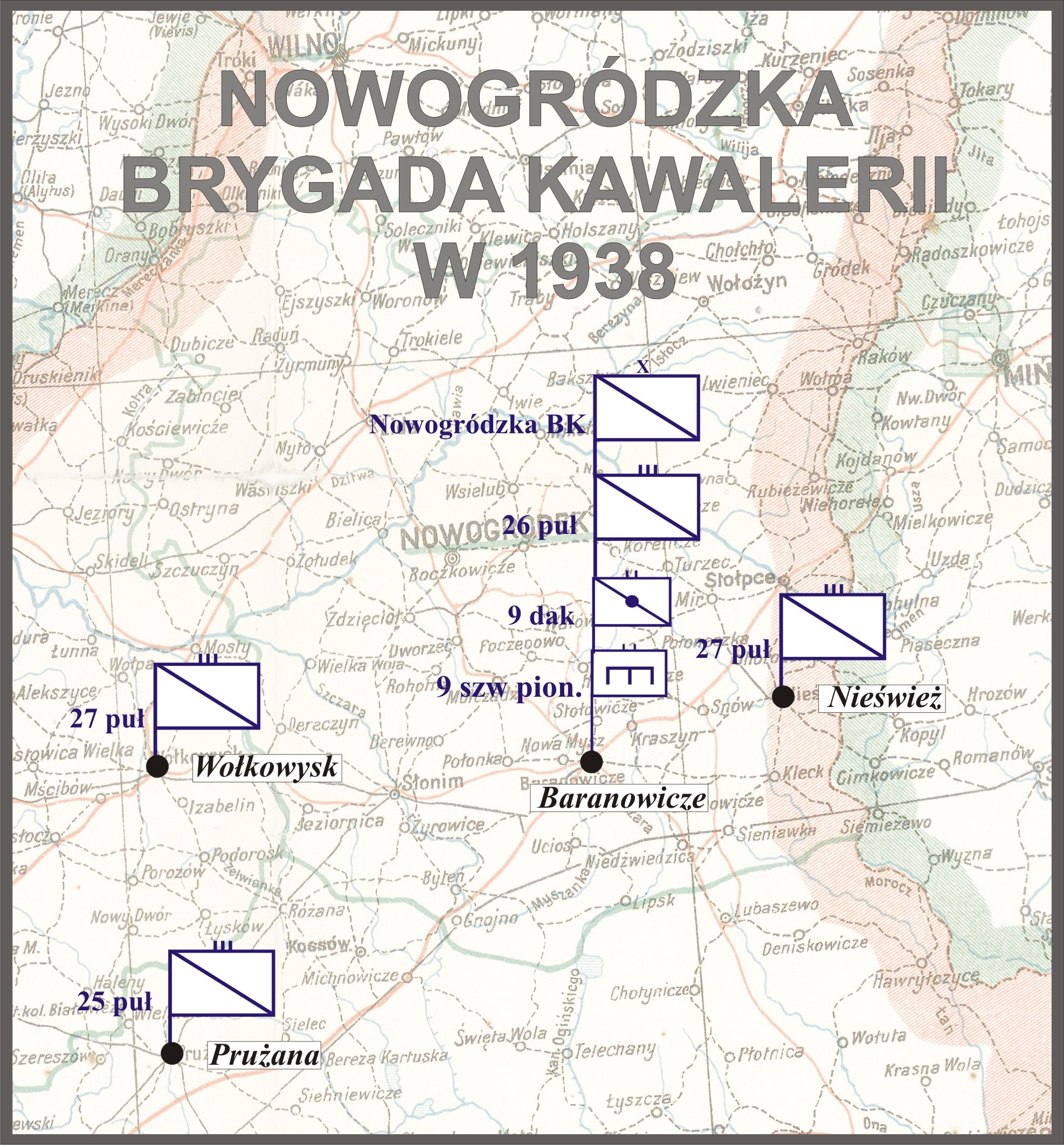
Nowogródzka BK w 1938

- 25th Greater Poland Uhlan Regiment, stationed in Pruzana,
- 26th Greater Poland Uhlan Regiment, stationed in Baranowicze,
- 27th King Stefan Batory Uhlan Regiment, stationed in Nieswiez,
- 3rd Regiment of Mounted Rifles, stationed in Wolkowysk,
- 9th Regiment of Mounted Artillery, stationed in Baranowicze,
- 9th Squadron of Pioneers, stationed in Baranowicze,
- 9th Squadron of Communication, stationed in Baranowicze.

== Participation in Polish September Campaign ==
The Brigade, commanded by General Władysław Anders, was mobilized as early as March 23, 1939 and, together with Polish 20th Infantry Division (also garrisoned in Baranowicze), was transported to the area of Sierpc and Płock. It became part of the Modlin Army, on August 8, 1939, it was moved north, to the Polish–Prussian border, near the town of Lidzbark. Its purpose was to cover western wing of the Army.

On September 1, 1939, the Brigade faced the German 217th Infantry Division of General Richard Baltzer, west of Mława. On September 4 it organized a successful counterattack, but after Polish positions had been broken, the Brigade had to withdraw south. It was ordered to defend the Vistula river between Dobrzyń and Czerwinsk.

On September 6, 1939, General Anders was informed that his troops became part of the freshly created Warszawa Army under General Juliusz Rómmel, six days later the Brigade was ordered to attack German forces in Mińsk Mazowiecki. The assault began on September 13, together with the Wielkopolska Cavalry Brigade the Poles attacked German 11th I.D. However, without support promised by the Army, the offensive halted. After that, General Rommel ordered the Brigade to move towards Lublin, as mounted troops were of no use in urban warfare in Warsaw.

Upon reaching the area of Lublin, the Brigade became part of Northern Front, commanded by General Stefan Dąb-Biernacki. By mid September it had been combined into an ad-hoc group with the Kresowa and Volhynian Cavalry Brigades. It took part in heavy fights in the Battle of Tomaszów Lubelski. On 23 September the brigade captured German general Rudolf Koch-Erpach and 100 of his men after stumbling across their command post during a breakthrough attempt. In the morning of September 27, 1939 the Germans, using aircraft, artillery and tanks, managed to destroy the Brigade.

== See also ==
- Polish army order of battle in 1939
- Polish contribution to World War II
